= Waco: The Aftermath =

- Genre: Crime drama; Legal drama
- Based on: A Place Called Waco: A Survivor's Story by David Thibodeau & Leon Whiteson
- Developed by: John Erick Dowdle; Drew Dowdle
- Starring: Michael Shannon; Giovanni Ribisi; Keean Johnson; Abbey Lee; Alex Breaux; John Hoogenakker; Kali Rocha; Michael Luwoye; Michael Cassidy; Sasheer Zamata; David Costabile
- Music by: The Newton Brothers
- Country of origin: United States
- Original language: English
- No. of episodes: 5

Production
- Executive producers: Drew Dowdle; John Erick Dowdle; Michael Shannon; Taylor Kitsch; Andrew Gettens; Lauren Mackenzie; David C. Glasser; David Hutkin; Bob Yari; Ron Burkle; Gary Barber
- Production location: Albuquerque, New Mexico
- Running time: 40–51 minutes
- Production companies: Brothers Dowdle Productions; 101 Studios; MTV Entertainment Studios; Spyglass Media Group

Original release
- Network: Showtime
- Release: April 16 – May 14, 2023

Related
- Waco (2018)

Waco: The Aftermath is an American television miniseries developed by John Erick Dowdle and Drew Dowdle that premiered on April 16, 2023, on Showtime. The five-episode series is a sequel to the 2018 miniseries Waco, which dramatizes the 1993 standoff between the Federal Bureau of Investigation (FBI), the Bureau of Alcohol, Tobacco, Firearms and Explosives (ATF), and the Branch Davidians in Waco, Texas. The sequel series portrays the aftermath of the siege and the trials of the surviving members of the Branch Davidians. The cast includes Michael Shannon, Shea Whigham, John Leguizamo, and Annika Marks, who reprise their roles from the Waco miniseries.

== Cast and characters ==
=== Main ===
- Michael Shannon as Gary Noesner, an FBI hostage negotiator
- Giovanni Ribisi as Dan Cogdell, a trial lawyer for the Branch Davidians
- Keean Johnson as Vernon Howell, a young David Koresh
- Abbey Lee as Carol Howe, a former Southern debutante turned neo-Nazi, turned government informant
- Alex Breaux as Timothy McVeigh, a notorious domestic terrorist
- John Hoogenakker as Clive Doyle, David Koresh's first follower within the Branch Davidians
- Kali Rocha as Ruth Riddle, one of the Davidians on trial and the possibility of life in prison
- Michael Luwoye as Livingstone Fagan, one of the Davidians on trial
- Michael Cassidy as Bill Johnston, the lead prosecutor in the trial of the Branch Davidians
- Sasheer Zamata as Angie Graham, an experienced ATF agent
- David Costabile as Judge Smith, who oversees the trial of Branch Davidians

=== Recurring ===
- J. Smith-Cameron as Lois Roden, the leader and Prophetess of the Branch Davidians
- Gary Cole as Gordon Novel, a private investigator
- Shea Whigham as Mitch Decker, the FBI agent who managed the situation leading up the siege
- John Leguizamo as Jacob Vasquez, an ATF agent who worked undercover during the lead up to Waco
- Annika Marks as Kathy Schroeder, one of the surviving Branch Davidians
- Nicholas Kolev as Paul Fatta, one of the Davidians on trial
- Michael Vincent Berry as George Roden, one of the early leaders of the Davidian sect
- Alexis Berent as Rachel Jones, the first and only legal wife of Vernon Howell
- Matthew Menalo as Rocket Rosen, a prosecutor in Texas, who worked with Cogdell
- Mark Speno as Doug Tinker, a defense attorney in Texas, who worked with Cogdell
- Seamus Dever as Andy the German.

== Episodes ==
No.	Title	Directed by	Written by	Original release date	U.S. viewers (millions)
1	"Truths and Consequences"	John Erick Dowdle	John Erick Dowdle and Lauren Mackenzie & Andrew Gettens	April 16, 2023	0.150
2	"A Common Enemy"	John Erick Dowdle	Lauren Mackenzie & Andrew Gettens and Stacy Chbosky and John Temple	April 23, 2023	N/A
3	"The Gospel According to Livingstone Fagan"	Drew Dowdle	Stacy Chbosky and John Temple	April 30, 2023	0.143
4	"Conspiracy"	Drew Dowdle	John Temple and Alice Dennard & Stacy Chbosky	May 7, 2023	0.128
5	"Reckoning"	John Erick Dowdle; Drew Dowdle	Alice Dennard & Stacy Chbosky and Andrew Gettens & Lauren Mackenzie	May 14, 2023	0.123

== Production ==
=== Development ===
In February 2021, Paramount+ announced American Tragedy, an anthology series that would focus on true crime, including a follow-up to the 2018 Waco miniseries. In March 2022, American Tragedies: Waco – The Trials was officially announced with Michael Shannon set to reprise his role of Gary Noesner. The series was created by brothers John Erick Dowdle and Drew Dowdle, who also created the 2018 miniseries. In February 2023, the series was retitled Waco: The Aftermath and would instead premiere on Showtime on April 16, 2023.

=== Casting ===
Alongside Shannon's casting in March 2022, the following month, John Leguizamo was confirmed to reprise his role, while David Costabile, J. Smith-Cameron, Giovanni Ribisi, John Hoogenakker, Keean Johnson and Abbey Lee were announced to star. In February 2023, it was announced that Shea Whigham and Annika Marks would reprise their roles from the original miniseries, and new cast members included Alex Breaux, Michael Cassidy, Gary Cole, Nicholas Kolev, Michael Luwoye, Kali Rocha, Michael Vincent Berry and Sasheer Zamata.

=== Filming ===
The series was filmed between March and June 2022 in Albuquerque, New Mexico.

== Reception ==
=== Critical response ===
On the review aggregator website Rotten Tomatoes, 29% of 7 critics' reviews are positive, with an average rating of 4.90/10. Metacritic gave the series a weighted average score of 52 out of 100 based on 7 reviews, indicating "mixed or average reviews".

=== Viewership ===
The series has become the third most-streamed Showtime original debut to date, behind Dexter: New Blood and Yellowjackets. With 1 million viewers, it has doubled its audience since opening weekend, according to Showtime.
