= Waco (miniseries) =

American television miniseries

- Genre: Crime; Drama; Thriller
- Based on: A Place Called Waco by David Thibodeau & Leon Whiteson; Stalling for Time: My Life as an FBI Hostage Negotiator by Gary Noesner
- Developed by: John Erick Dowdle; Drew Dowdle
- Written by: John Erick Dowdle; Drew Dowdle; Salvatore Stabile; Sarah Nicole Jones
- Directed by: John Erick Dowdle; Dennie Gordon
- Starring: Michael Shannon; Taylor Kitsch; Andrea Riseborough; Paul Sparks; Rory Culkin; Shea Whigham; Melissa Benoist; John Leguizamo; Julia Garner; Glenn Fleshler
- Composers: Jeff Russo; Jordan Gagne
- Country of origin: United States
- Original language: English
- No. of episodes: 6

Production
- Executive producers: Harvey Weinstein (uncredited); David C. Glasser; Michael Shannon; Taylor Kitsch; Megan Spanjian; Salvatore Stabile; John Erick Dowdle; Drew Dowdle; Ted Gold
- Producer: Kelly A. Manners
- Cinematography: Todd McMullen
- Editors: Elliot Greenberg; Christopher Nelson
- Running time: 47–52 minutes
- Production companies: The Weinstein Company (uncredited); Brothers Dowdle Productions

Original release
- Network: Paramount Network
- Release: January 24 – February 28, 2018

Related
- Waco: The Aftermath

Waco is an American television miniseries, developed by John Erick Dowdle and Drew Dowdle, that premiered on January 24, 2018, on Paramount Network. The six-episode series dramatizes the 1993 standoff between the Federal Bureau of Investigation (FBI), the Bureau of Alcohol, Tobacco, Firearms and Explosives (ATF), and the Branch Davidians in Waco, Texas and stars Michael Shannon, Taylor Kitsch, Andrea Riseborough, Paul Sparks, Rory Culkin, Shea Whigham, Melissa Benoist, John Leguizamo, Julia Garner, and Glenn Fleshler. The miniseries received a mixed response from critics who praised the performances and tension, but criticized the show's sympathetic approach to Branch Davidian leader David Koresh. A sequel titled Waco: The Aftermath premiered on April 16, 2023, on Showtime.

== Premise ==
Waco is a dramatized exploration of the 51-day 1993 standoff between the FBI, ATF and David Koresh's religious faction, the Branch Davidians, in Waco, Texas, that culminated in a fatal fire. It investigates the tragedy before and during the standoff, from a variety of viewpoints of those most personally associated with the two sides of the dispute.

== Cast and characters ==
=== Main ===
- Michael Shannon as Gary Noesner
- Taylor Kitsch as David Koresh
- Andrea Riseborough as Judy Schneider
- Paul Sparks as Steve Schneider
- Rory Culkin as David Thibodeau
- Shea Whigham as Mitch Decker
- Melissa Benoist as Rachel Koresh
- John Leguizamo as Jacob Vazquez (Note: Character based on actual ATF agent Robert Rodriguez. Originally announced as being Rodriguez before being renamed.)
- Julia Garner as Michele Jones
- Glenn Fleshler as Tony Prince (Note: Credited among the main cast beginning with the third episode, "Operation Showtime".)

=== Recurring ===
- Demore Barnes as Wayne Martin
- Duncan Joiner as Cyrus Koresh
- Annika Marks as Kathy Schroeder
- Tait Fletcher as Brad Branch
- Vivien Lyra Blair as Serenity Jones
- J.B. Tuttle as Davey Jones
- Camryn Manheim as Balenda Thibodeau
- Darcel Danielle as Sheila Martin
- Cayen Martin as Jamie Martin
- Eric Lange as Ron Engelman
- Michael Hyland as Walter Graves
- Rich Ting as Lon Horiuchi
- Christopher Stanley as Edward Wiggins
- Andy Umberger as Perry Jones
- Eli Goodman as Barry Skinner
- Ryan Jason Cook as Derek Ludlow
- Kimberly Kiegel as Catherine Matteson
- Kimberly Bigsby as Jaydean Wendell
- Kenneth Miller as Mike Schroeder
- Stephanie Kurtzuba as Carol Noesner
- Steven Culp as Jeff Jamar
- David Grant Wright as James Tabor

=== Guest ===
- Hans Christopher as Randy Weaver
- Samuel Kamphuis as Sammy Weaver
- Marianna Gallegos as Vicki Weaver
- Vic Browder as Bo Gritz
- Sarah Minnich as Sharon Wheeler
- Rex Linn as Dick DeGuerin
- Jon Kristian Moore as Jack Zimmerman
- Connie Ventress as Janet Reno
- Ralph Alderman as Sheriff Harwell

== Episodes ==
No.	Title	Directed by	Written by	Original release date	U.S. viewers (millions)
1	"Visions and Omens"	John Erick Dowdle	John Erick Dowdle & Drew Dowdle	January 24, 2018	1.107
Nine months before the Waco siege, David Koresh preaches to his Branch Davidians at the Mount Carmel Center about what joy is. Afterward, he and a few of his followers perform as a cover band at a bar where Koresh meets David Thibodeau. Judy Schneider, one of Koresh's many wives, learns she is pregnant with his child. This puts her at odds with Steve, her true husband, and Koresh's right-hand man. Meanwhile, Gary Noesner, head of the FBI Crisis Negotiation Unit is assigned to Ruby Ridge to help defuse the standoff there. Six months later, the ATF is criticized for the way the Ruby Ridge case was handled, and Noesner holds some concerns about the written report which paints Mitch Decker, an FBI agent who Noesner believes acted poorly in the handling of the situation, in a positive light. The ATF receives word that a shipment of weapons is bound for Mount Carmel, and begins surveillance on the compound.
2	"The Strangers Across the Street"	John Erick Dowdle	John Erick Dowdle & Drew Dowdle	January 31, 2018	0.737
With his surveillance team, ATF agent Jacob Vazquez disguises himself as a rancher and befriends David Koresh and the Branch Davidians to investigate where the weapons are stashed and to find out their true intentions. However, Steve already has some suspicions about their new neighbors. Koresh suggests that David Thibodeau marry Michelle as a way to ward off the state's child services. An upset Michelle, despite having feelings for Thibodeau, blames her sister Rachel for forcing her into marriage without her consent, to which Rachel retorts that she was not happy about the notion of having to share her husband with other women but did it out of loyalty to God. A jealousy towards David's other wives can be observed in Rachel at this point. The wedding proceeds and Vazquez tries to blend in. FBI agent Gary Noesner plans on filing a complaint against fellow agent Mitch Decker for his behavior on the Ruby Ridge case. As it continues to haunt Noesner, he looks to his wife for consolation and advice to help him stop second-guessing his decisions. The Waco Tribune-Herald releases an article painting David Koresh as a "Sinful Messiah", which doesn't sit too well with Rachel, Steve, and Koresh himself. After the Davidians are tipped off and Vazquez's cover is blown, Koresh instructs him to stop the raid, but it's all in vain when ATF agents in transit ignore his pleas.
3	"Operation Showtime"	John Erick Dowdle	Salvatore Stabile	February 7, 2018	0.824
ATF agents in tactical gear storm Mount Carmel Center and gunfire is exchanged, initiating a standoff between government officials and the Branch Davidians. After both parties call for a cease fire, a wounded David Koresh phones in Ron Engelman at a Dallas-area radio station during a live broadcast detailing the deadly siege. The FBI takes over operations from ATF and lead negotiator Gary Noesner establishes contact with Koresh in hopes for a peaceful resolution. Koresh suggests that the FBI broadcast his message to national media outlets before he could surrender. Later, Noesner talks with Jacob Vazquez in an attempt to find out whether the ATF or the Davidians fired first in the ambush. Perry Jones, severely wounded from the gunfire, says his last goodbyes to his daughters, Rachel and Michelle, and his fellowship before Koresh ends his suffering. ATF and FBI hold a press conference recapping the events of the raid and playing an audiotape by Koresh as promised. The sect packed their belongings and FBI agents prepare to escort them out, but in a shocking turn of events, Koresh makes a statement to Noesner over the phone saying they're not leaving. When Thibodeau's mother, Balenda Ganem, hears about the siege, she drives to Waco, concerned about her son's safety, and encounters Bonnie Sue Haldemann, the mother of David Koresh.
4	"Of Milk and Men"	Dennie Gordon	Sarah Nicole Jones	February 14, 2018	0.780
After the first attempt to evacuate the Branch Davidians from Mount Carmel fails, Noesner suggests a new sensible plan to get the children out first safely while other FBI agents prefer to use force fearing that David Koresh and his followers would commit mass suicide. Koresh preaches to his remaining sect members that he'll wait for a sign from God and warns that the Kingdom of Heaven is coming, but he faints mid-way into the sermon. Noesner and fellow agent Walter Graves then focus their attention on Steve Schneider, who turns out to be the star recruiter. The shrinking food and water supplies and the lack of proper medical attention test the faith and patience of the Davidians and FBI respectively. David Thibodeau buries Perry Jones' body in the front yard instead of the bunker at Michelle's request. Steve contacts Noesner asking for milk after Rachel informs him that the mothers have stopped lactating. However, Noesner recommends adding listening bugs to the gallons so they'll have ears inside the compound. Throughout, Noesner's trickle method seems to work as a few Davidians left the complex, including a few kids. Later, the Koresh family with help from Steve send their videotape to the FBI blaming the government for the fatal attack. As parents begged their loved ones to walk out, electricity to the facility has been cut, leaving Koresh and the Davidians in the dark.
5	"Stalling for Time"	Dennie Gordon	Salvatore Stabile	February 21, 2018	0.691
Over a week into the stalemate, Gary Noesner and his boss Tony Prince are at odds with each other on how David Koresh and the Branch Davidians should be handled. Kathy Schroder, upon seeing footage of her son Danny, leaves the compound to be with him. But immediately, Brad Branch follows after Koresh catches him drinking. Another week later, a frustrated Noesner snaps at colleagues Prince and Decker for continuing with their aggressive maneuvers after Koresh complains of armored tanks driving around their property. Tensions escalate as sect members feel the strain from the impasse. Over the phone, Noesner, in a reasonable calming tone, begs Koresh to level with him. At another press conference, Balenda, David Thibodeau's mom, demands that she and the other families in attendance intervene. Just as everything was settling down, Decker cuts their power off again and uses bright lights and a barrage of nuisance noises from their sound system as a way to flush the Davidians out. However, Wayne Martin powers on the generator, then Koresh and Thibodeau use it to their advantage to counter the annoyance. Bonnie Sue bonds with Balenda over her frustrations in regards to the secrecy and lack of access to the compound enforced by authorities, as well as their worries over the safety of their children and their childhood struggles.
6	"Day 51"	John Erick Dowdle	John Erick Dowdle & Drew Dowdle	February 28, 2018	0.901
Attorneys visit with David Koresh and his followers to discuss the case at hand and options. From there, it looks like the stalemate is concluding, but Koresh asks Gary Noesner over the phone to let him write out the Seven Seals before he and his group submit themselves. Noesner agrees, but after a week has passed Koresh reneges on the deal and demands more time to perfect his manuscript. Tony Prince and Mitch Decker finally lose their patience and remove Noesner from the premises. Decker takes over and tactical agents are given the green light to use tanks to penetrate Mount Carmel and inject CS gas to flush out the sect members. This has the opposite effect as Steve issues gas masks and Koresh relocates everyone to bunkers within the school bus and the vault in the kitchen. When the FBI locates the Davidians via infrared scans they decide to insert CS gas directly into the vault. However, damage from the tanks causes parts of the building to cave in. The door to the vault becomes permanently blocked, turning it into a gas chamber from which none of the Davidians can survive. Meanwhile, a fire starts within the complex, gradually engulfing the wooden structure in flames. A few more Davidians, including Thibodeau, escape and surrender to authorities who promptly arrest them. The remaining members try desperately to escape through the bunker in the school bus, but it has caved in too far for anyone to escape the gas in time. The 76 that remain in the burning compound, including Koresh and the children, perish from smoke inhalation or mercy killings, bringing the 51-day standoff to a horrific end. Prince and the FBI paint the events as a mass suicide, as Noesner and the families are left to reconcile the tragic events.

== Series epilogue ==
The series epilogue reads: "The FBI denied using incendiary devices that would ignite a fire. They claimed the Branch Davidians intentionally started the fire in an apparent mass suicide. The Justice Department's Danforth Report in 2000 concluded the fire was started by the Branch Davidians. The report also acknowledged that the FBI had used incendiary flash-bang grenades in the assault. Surviving Branch Davidians maintain that there was never a plan for mass suicide. FBI Negotiators successfully secured the release of 35 Branch Davidians during the siege. As a result of the tragedy in Waco, 76 Branch Davidians died in the fire. 25 of them were children."

== Production ==
=== Development ===
John Erick Dowdle and Drew Dowdle initially conceived the project as a feature film. That original work eventually developed into a film script that ended up being around 150 pages. Concerned about its length, the brothers even changed the margins in an attempt to make the script shorter and therefore increasing their chances of interesting a studio. Eventually, Drew decided to convert their film project into a limited series, despite never having attempted that sort of format before. After bringing their project to The Weinstein Company, the producers agreed that the story would best be served in a longer format.

On August 30, 2016, it was announced that The Weinstein Company, through their Weinstein Television arm, was developing a television miniseries based upon the 1993 Branch Davidian siege in Waco, Texas. It was reported that John Erick Dowdle and Drew Dowdle would write the series with the former directing. The series is based on two biographies: A Place Called Waco, by Branch Davidian survivor David Thibodeau, and Stalling for Time: My Life as an FBI Hostage Negotiator, written by the FBI's Special Agent in Charge of Negotiations Gary Noesner. During the pre-production process, the Dowdle brothers spent a week at the Baylor University archives, where they have the largest collection related to the Waco siege, in order to conduct further research for the series.

On October 26, 2016, it was announced that Spike had picked up the rights to the series; Spike TV was later rebranded as Paramount Network in January 2018. On April 21, 2017, it was reported that Salvatore Stabile and Sarah Nicole Jones had joined the writing staff and that four episodes would be directed by John Erick Dowdle with the remaining two directed by Dennie Gordon.

=== Casting ===
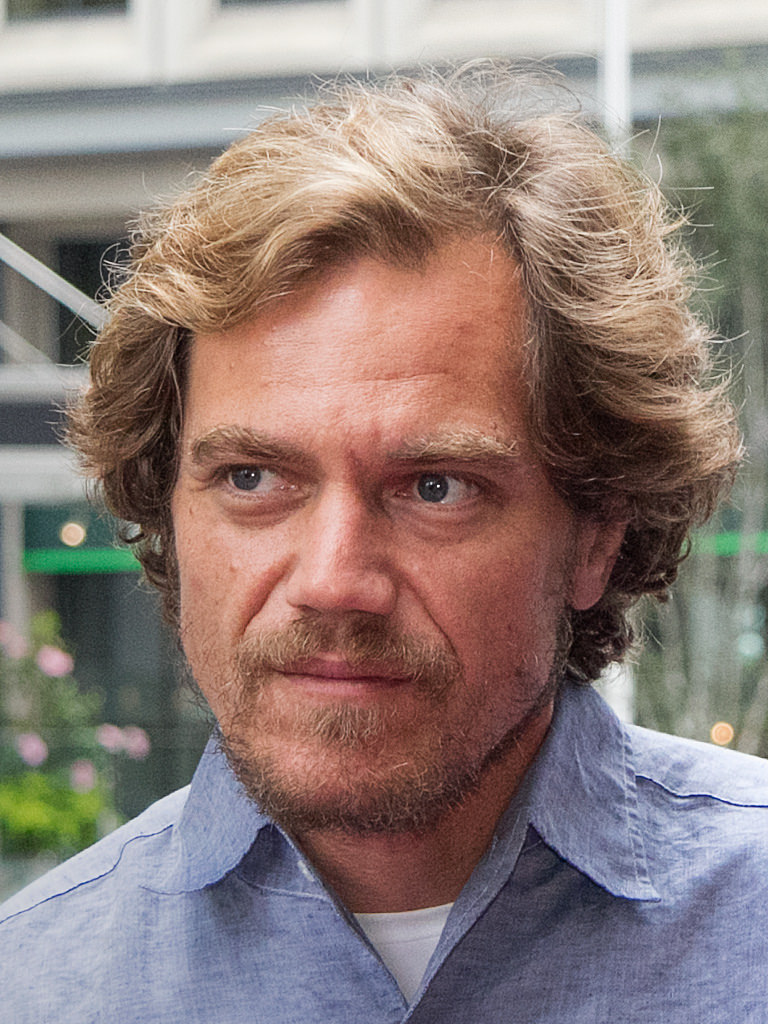
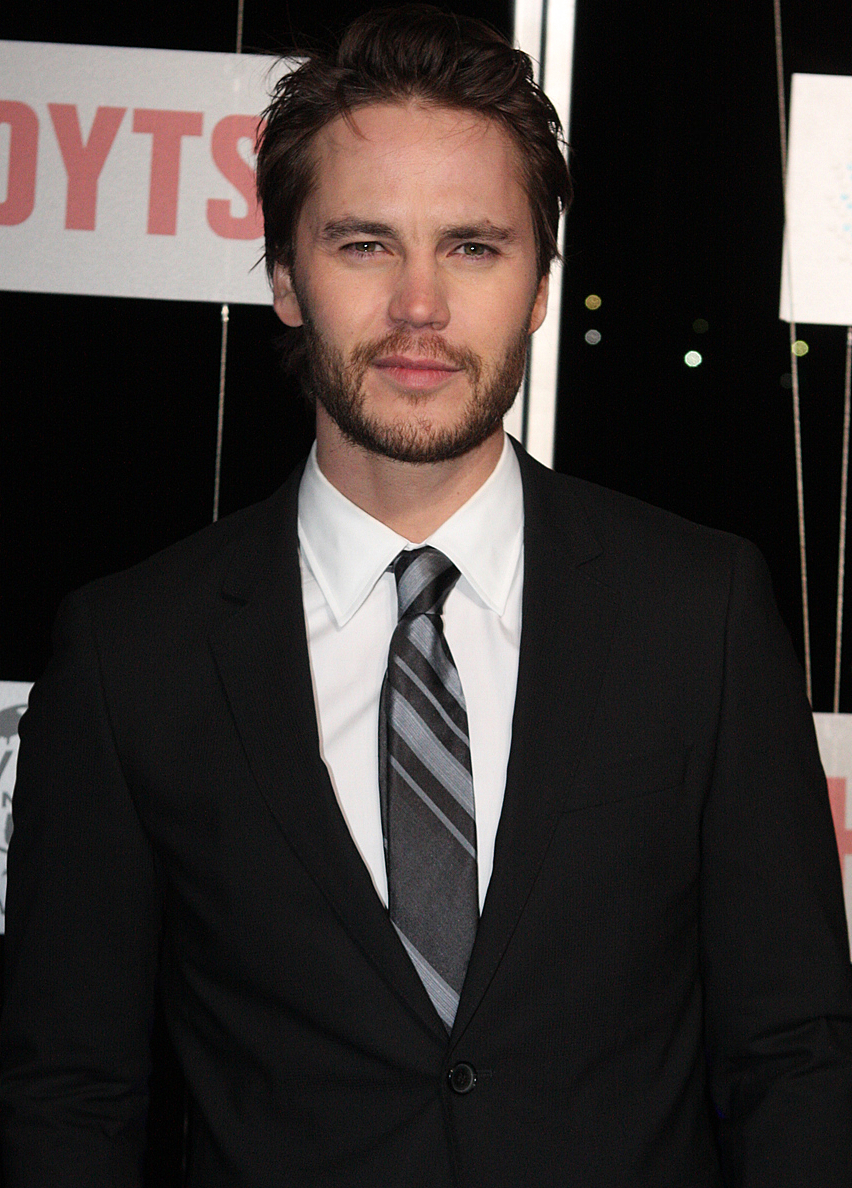
Michael Shannon (left) portrayed Gary Noesner; Taylor Kitsch (right) played David Koresh.

Alongside the series order announcement, it was confirmed that Michael Shannon and Taylor Kitsch had been cast as Gary Noesner and David Koresh, respectively. On March 24, 2017, it was announced that John Leguizamo had joined the cast in the role of ATF agent Robert Rodriguez. Later that month, Andrea Riseborough, Rory Culkin, Paul Sparks, and Shea Whigham were also added as series regulars. In April 2017, it was reported that Melissa Benoist and Julia Garner had boarded the series as regulars. A few days later, Camryn Manheim, Eric Lange, Annika Marks, Steven Culp, and Sarah Minnich were revealed to have been cast in recurring roles.

Kitsch underwent a great deal of preparation and physical transformation for the role of Koresh. This included losing a substantial amount of weight, growing out his hair, and learning to play the guitar.

=== Filming ===
In March 2017, it was reported that the series was set to be filmed in Santa Fe County, New Mexico. On April 10, 2017, the New Mexico Film Office issued a press release stating that principal photography would begin in mid-April and last through the end of June.

== Release ==
=== Marketing ===
On September 26, 2017, Paramount released the first trailer for the series. A second trailer was released in November.

=== Weinstein controversy ===
On October 9, 2017, it was announced that following reports of sexual abuse allegations against producer Harvey Weinstein, his name would be removed from the series' credits as would The Weinstein Company. On January 15, 2018, Kevin Kay, president of Paramount Network, clarified that Waco would not have The Weinstein Company's credits or logo on them, even though that company was involved in the production, with Harvey Weinstein also serving as executive producer. Furthermore, he stated that they intend to replace Weinstein Television with the company's new name in the show's credits when available.

=== Premiere ===
On January 24, 2018, the series had its official world premiere at Paley Center for Media in New York City. The premiere included a screening of the first episode and a discussion moderated by The New York Times's Dave Itzkoff with the cast and crew featuring Taylor Kitsch, Michael Shannon, Rory Culkin, Andrea Riseborough, Gary Noesner, David Thibodeau, John Erick Dowdle, and Drew Dowdle.

== Reception ==
=== Critical response ===
The series was met with a mixed response from critics upon its premiere. On the review aggregation website Rotten Tomatoes, the series holds a 70% approval rating with an average rating of 6.6 out of 10 based on 46 reviews. The website's critical consensus reads, "Waco brings its fact-based drama to life with an outstanding ensemble, though its sympathetic approach to the main character may offend some viewers." Metacritic, which uses a weighted average, assigned the series a score of 56 out of 100 based on 15 critics, indicating "mixed or average reviews".

Matt Zoller Seitz of New York Magazine offered the series restrained praise saying, "It doesn't go nearly as far as it could've, given what a quietly charismatic star it has in Taylor Kitsch as David Koresh, and how immediately human all of his followers seem. All that being said, this is still a necessary and sometimes powerful series, particularly in the third hour, which depicts the initial assault on the compound that led to the two-month siege." Alex McLevy of The A.V. Club praised the actors' performances while criticizing the series' writing saying, "In every case, the actor elevates the material, raising passable storytelling to a more compelling and charismatic level." Mike Hale of The New York Times gave the series a mixed review, saying, "Waco is a workmanlike summary of events that paints a largely, some might say excessively, sympathetic portrait of Koresh and his followers. This is likely because of the demands of dramatic compression rather than any propagandizing on the part of the show's makers." In a negative review, Lorraine Ali of The Los Angeles Times commented, "Waco isn't skillful enough to weave all the opposing perspectives here into a three-dimensional story, where the ultimate victims are the innocent folk betrayed by their leader and their government. It's so busy delivering Spam-sized chunks of ham-fisted dialogue defending the misunderstood Koresh, it loses all those other critical threads that make Waco a cautionary tale for all sides."

=== Ratings ===
In addition to airing on the Paramount Network, episodes of the miniseries were simulcast on CMT.

No.	Title	Air date	Rating (18–49)	Viewers (millions)	CMT (18–49)	CMT viewers (millions)	Total (18–49)	Total viewers (millions)
1	"Visions and Omens"	January 24, 2018	0.38	1.107	0.12	0.344	0.5	1.45
2	"The Strangers Across the Street"	January 31, 2018	0.26	0.737	0.09	0.264	0.35	1.00
3	"Operation Showtime"	February 7, 2018	0.28	0.824	0.11	0.306	0.39	1.13
4	"Of Milk and Men"	February 14, 2018	0.28	0.78	0.04	0.198	0.32	0.98
5	"Stalling for Time"	February 21, 2018	0.24	0.691	0.09	0.282	0.33	0.97
6	"Day 51"	February 28, 2018	0.29	0.901	0.05	0.193	0.34	1.09

=== Awards and nominations ===
Award	Category	Nominee(s)	Result	Ref.
70th Primetime Emmy Awards	Outstanding Supporting Actor in a Limited Series or Movie	John Leguizamo	Nominated	
70th Primetime Creative Arts Emmy Awards	Outstanding Sound Mixing for a Limited Series or Movie	Craig Mann, Laura Wiest, and David Brownlow (for "Operation: Showtime")	Nominated	
70th Primetime Creative Arts Emmy Awards	Outstanding Sound Editing for a Limited Series, Movie or Special	Kelly Oxford, Karen Triest, Mitch Bederman, and Brian Straub (for "Operation: Showtime")	Nominated	

== Other media ==
=== Revelations of Waco ===
Revelations of Waco is a companion documentary series released exclusively on the Paramount Network website and YouTube channel following the initial airing of each episode of the miniseries. The series reveals the true to life details of the Waco siege through interviews with those on both sides of the conflict. Each episode runs between nine and thirteen minutes in length.

No.	Title	Original release date
1	"Ruby Ridge: Setting the Stage"	January 24, 2018
Former FBI negotiator Gary Noesner and former ATF agent John Risenhoover discuss the real story of the Ruby Ridge hostage situation, and how it set the stage months before Waco.
2	"Church and State: The Prophetic Vernon Howell"	January 31, 2018
Theologians explain how a young man named Vernon Howell came to change his name to David Koresh and become the leader of the Branch Davidians.
3	"Operation Showtime: Who Shot First?"	February 7, 2018
ATF officers and Branch Davidian survivors recount the first day of the infamous raid on the Mt. Carmel compound.
4	"Psychology of Belief: Manipulating Minds at Mount Carmel"	February 14, 2018
Branch Davidians, Waco survivors, and federal agents reveal the full extent of David Koresh's manipulative and powerful take on scripture.
5	"How Not to Negotiate With Believers: Sending Mixed Signals"	February 21, 2018
FBI Agent Gary Noesner provides his insights during his time at Mt. Carmel while negotiating with David Koresh.
6	"The Legacy of Waco: Lessons Learned"	February 28, 2018
Survivors of Waco, along with FBI agents and officers, explore their thoughts about the lasting effects of the devastation upon the Mt. Carmel Branch Davidians.

=== Soundtrack ===
Sony Classical has released a soundtrack album for the series that features selections of the show's original music, composed by Jeff Russo and Jordan Gagne.

All music is composed by Jeff Russo and Jordan Gagne.

No.	Title	Length
1.	"Waco (Main Title Theme)"	0:34
2.	"Tear Gas"	2:43
3.	"David's Theme"	1:48
4.	"Sniper at Ruby Ridge"	1:35
5.	"Rachel Dies"	2:14
6.	"Incendiary"	1:39
7.	"Satellite Response"	1:13
8.	"Burning Compound"	1:17
9.	"Out for Blood"	1:41
10.	"Survivor List"	2:33
11.	"McLellan Prison"	4:05
Total length:		21:23

=== Sequel series ===
A follow-up series titled Waco: The Aftermath premiered on April 16, 2023, on Showtime. It centers on the fallout from the Waco siege as well as the emerging patriot movement and features Michael Shannon, John Leguizamo, Shea Whigham and Annika Marks reprising their roles from the original miniseries.
