= Ruth Riddle =

Canadian Branch Davidian (born 1964)

Ruth Ottman Riddle (born 10 March 1964) is a Canadian Branch Davidian and survivor of the Waco siege. Riddle was raised in the Seventh-day Adventist Church. She was born as Ruth Ellen Ottman. Riddle was one of nine survivors of the 19 April 1993 fire that destroyed the Mount Carmel Center and most of its occupants. She carried with her after leaving the compound a copy of David Koresh's final incomplete manuscript which after creating he agreed to leave. It was reprinted in James D. Tabor and Eugene V. Gallagher's book Why Waco?: Cults and the Battle for Religious Freedom in America. She was married to another Branch Davidian, James Loyle Riddle, who died in the 19 April 1993 fire. Her niece, Misty Dawn Ferguson, survived the fire as well. She was formerly of Tweed, Ontario. However, other sources indicate she is from Oshawa, Ontario.

== Waco siege and survival ==
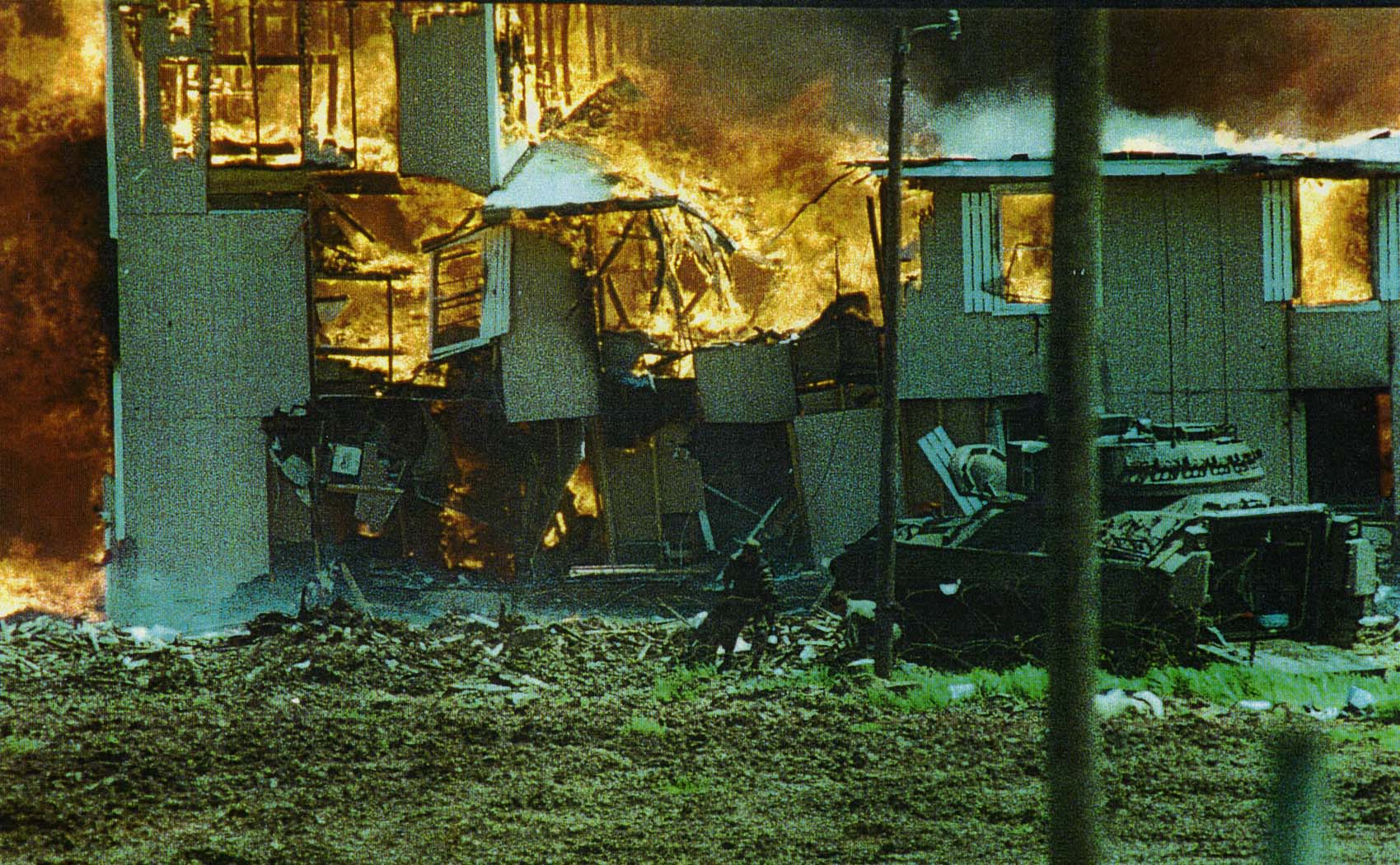
An FBI agent carries Riddle to safety

During the Waco siege, Koresh announced that he would surrender to the FBI after making a manuscript of his interpretation of the seven seals in the Book of Revelation. Ruth Riddle typed out an incomplete manuscript on a battery-powered word processor just before the 19 April 1993 fire.

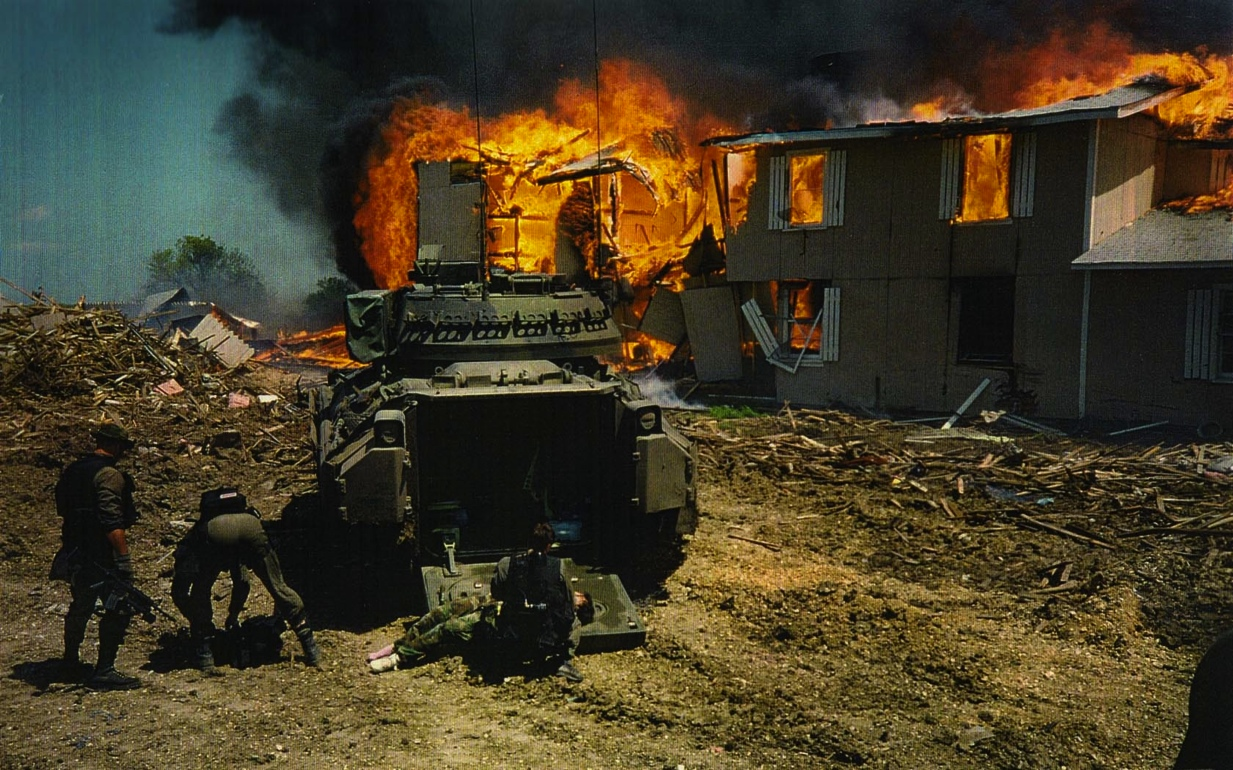
An agent tends to Riddle behind a Bradley vehicle

Riddle reportedly jumped from a second-story window to the ground on 19 April 1993 after the fire started, but returned to the Mount Carmel Center. An FBI agent, James McGee, left his Bradley Combat Engineer Vehicle and asked her where the children of the Branch Davidians were, but Riddle provided no answer. McGee carried Riddle out of the compound soon after their interaction. She sustained burn injuries to her feet and a broken ankle. The Tampa Bay Times reported however that she fell to the ground outside the compound, not inside. Catherine Wessinger, a religion scholar who has conducted oral histories with various Branch Davidians, argues that an exhibit in the 2000 civil case against the federal government demonstrates that she did not re-enter the building after jumping through the window, likely because she broke her ankle and could not walk on it. A lawyer for the Branch Davidians, Dick DeGuerin, told the New York Times that she laid outside the compound after jumping because her feet were burned from the heated tin roof of the compound.

== Life after the siege ==
On 26 April 1993, U.S. magistrate Dennis Green released Ruth Riddle, with her sister-in-law Rita Fay Riddle and David Thibodeau, from police custody to a Salvation Army halfway house in Waco, Texas, and under a US$25,000 unsecured bond. She was being held as a material witness.

On 26 February 1994, Riddle's charges were either dropped or she was found not guilty. On 28 February 1994, Riddle was facing deportation to Canada, but U.S. federal judge, Walter Scott Smith, ordered her to be put back into the U.S. Marshal's custody in order to reinstate weapons charges brought up against her with other Branch Davidians. Despite being found not guilty of murder charges and had weapons charges thrown out since a U.S. judge did not find them relevant in her case, she was at threat of deportation since she was in the United States illegally, according to the Toronto Star.

On 17 June 1994, Riddle and seven other Branch Davidians, including Livingstone Fagan, were sentenced on their roles in the 28 February 1993 shootout. Riddle received the mandatory minimum sentence of five years in prison and a US$5,000 fine. According to the Toronto Star, the jury foreperson Sara Bain said that the jury never intended to give Riddle any prison time, in part because the jury and judge believed that she was easily manipulated. Along with Livingstone Fagan, she did not appeal her conviction.

In December 1997, she was deported to Canada.
