= List of Animal Kingdom characters =

Animal Kingdom is an American drama television series developed by Jonathan Lisco. It is based on the 2010 Australian film of the same name by David Michôd. The series centers on Joshua "J" Cody who, after the death of his mother when he was 17 years old, moves in with his estranged relatives, the Codys, who run a criminal family enterprise set in Oceanside, California that is governed by the respected matriarch, Janine "Smurf" Cody.

The Codys partake in numerous criminal activities and pull off various heists to make money. These jobs are undertaken by J's uncles: Barry "Baz" Blackwell, Smurf's adopted son who calls the shots; Andrew "Pope" Cody, the oldest and most dangerous of Smurf's sons; Craig Cody, the tough and fearless middle son; and Deran Cody, the troubled and suspicious youngest son. Associates of the Cody family include Catherine Belen, Baz's girlfriend and mother of their daughter; Nicky Belmont, J's girlfriend and fellow high school student; Lucy, Baz's mistress from Mexico; and Mia Benitez, a young gang member.

A younger Smurf, who is a member of a crew of career criminals while establishing her future criminal enterprise, is also depicted in the years 1977, 1984, 1992 and 1999. Members of her crew include Jake Dunmore, her on-again/off-again boyfriend; Manny, the leader of her crew, and later her children; teenagers Andrew and Baz, and her only daughter, Julia Cody.

== Cast ==
=== Main cast ===
The following is a list of cast members who have been credited as series regulars and appeared in one or more of the series' six seasons. They are listed in the order of their first appearance and follow the order that they were first credited in the series. Several characters are also portrayed by multiple actors due to the occurrence of flashback sequences.

Key

= Main cast (actor receives "Starring" credit that season)
= Recurring cast (actor appears in three or more episodes that season)
= Guest cast (actor appears in only one or two episodes that season)

Actor	Character	First episode	Final episode	Seasons					
Actor	Character	First episode	Final episode	1	2	3	4	5	6
Ellen Barkin	Janine "Smurf" Cody	1.01	4.12	Main	Main	Main	Main		
Rimea Kasprzak (Note: Portrays the character in flashbacks.)	Janine "Smurf" Cody	1.05	1.10	Guest					
Leila George	Janine "Smurf" Cody	4.01	6.13				Recurring	Main	Main
Scott Speedman	Barry "Baz" Blackwell	1.01	6.11	Main (Note: In season 3, Speedman is credited as a series regular in episode 1. From episodes 2 to 13, he is not credited and does not appear.)	Main	Main			Guest (Note: Appears only in flashbacks.)
Reeve Baker	Barry "Baz" Blackwell	5.11	–					Guest	
Darren Mann	Barry "Baz" Blackwell	6.01	6.13						Recurring
Shawn Hatosy	Andrew "Pope" Cody (Note: Also portrayed by an uncredited infant actor during flashbacks in season 4, episodes 12–13.)	1.01	6.13	Main	Main	Main	Main	Main	Main
Houston Towe	Andrew "Pope" Cody	5.01	5.13					Recurring	
Kevin Csolak	Andrew "Pope" Cody	6.01	6.13						Recurring
Ben Robson	Craig Cody	1.01	6.13	Main	Main	Main	Main	Main	Main
Oz Kalvan	Craig Cody	6.01	6.12						Recurring
Jack Michael Doke	Craig Cody	6.13	–						Guest
Jake Weary	Deran Cody	1.01	6.13	Main	Main	Main	Main	Main	Main
Cyrus Blomberg	Deran Cody	6.01	6.12						Recurring
Dexter Hobert	Deran Cody	6.13	–						Guest
Finn Cole	Joshua "J" Cody	1.01	6.13	Main	Main	Main	Main	Main	Main
Daniella Alonso	Catherine Belen	1.01	1.09	Main					
Molly Gordon	Nicky Belmont	1.01	3.06	Main (Note: In season 3, Gordon is credited as a series regular from episodes 1 to 7. From episodes 8 to 13, she is not credited and does not appear.)	Main	Main			
Carolina Guerra	Lucy	1.02	3.13	Recurring	Main	Main			
Sohvi Rodriguez	Mia Trujillo	3.01	4.08			Recurring	Main (Note: In season 4, Rodriguez is credited as a series regular from episodes 1 to 8. From episodes 9 to 13, she is not credited and does not appear.)		
Jack Conley	Jake Dunmore	1.07	4.13	Guest	Recurring		Guest		
Jon Beavers	Jake Dunmore	4.01	5.13				Recurring	Main	
Rigo Sanchez	Manny (Note: Also portrayed by an uncredited actor in season 2, episode 3.)	4.01	5.12				Recurring	Main	

=== Supporting cast ===
The following is a list of cast members who have appeared in multiple episodes of one or more of the series' six seasons. Guest appearances have also been included where appropriate. They are listed in the order of their first appearance and follow the order that they were first credited in the series. Several characters are also portrayed by multiple actors due to the occurrence of flashback sequences.

Actor	Character	First episode	Final episode	Seasons					
Actor	Character	First episode	Final episode	1	2	3	4	5	6
Aamya Deva Keroles	Lena Blackwell	1.01	6.03	Recurring	Recurring	Recurring	Guest		Guest
C. Thomas Howell	Lieutenant Commander; Paul Belmont	1.01	3.07	Recurring		Guest			
Spencer Treat Clark	Adrian Dolan	1.02	4.13	Recurring	Recurring	Recurring	Recurring		
Christina Ochoa	Renn Randall	1.02	6.12	Recurring	Recurring	Recurring	Recurring	Recurring	Recurring
Ellen Wroe	Alexa Anderson	1.02	1.10	Recurring					
Dorian Missick	Officer Patrick Fischer	1.03	2.11	Recurring	Guest				
Michael Bowen	Vin	1.03	6.05	Recurring					Guest
Joseph Julian Soria	Marco	1.03	3.11	Guest	Recurring	Recurring			
Alvaro Martinez	Carlos	1.03	3.13	Guest	Guest	Guest			
Nicki Micheaux	Detective Sandra Yates	1.05	1.10	Recurring					
Will Brandt	Brandon Randall	1.06	6.07	Guest					Guest
Ray Baker	Isaiah	1.07	1.10	Guest					
Dennis Cockrum	Ray Blackwell	1.08	2.11	Guest	Guest				
Alex Meraz	Javier "Javi" Cano	2.01	2.07		Recurring				
Jennifer Landon	Amy Wheeler	2.02	6.07		Recurring	Guest			Guest
Karina Logue	Gia	2.02	6.01		Guest		Guest		Guest
Kristi Lauren (Note: Portrays the character in flashbacks.)	Gia	6.01	–						Guest
Tembi Locke	Monica	2.02	2.03		Guest				
Bernardo Badillo	Deek	2.03	2.07		Recurring				
Andy Favreau	Mark Liston	2.06	2.08		Guest				
Amanda Payton	Dana	2.08	2.10		Guest				
Laura San Giacomo	Morgan Wilson	2.11	3.12		Recurring	Recurring			
Jamie Renée Smith	Morgan Wilson	6.02	–						Guest
Gil Birmingham	Detective Pearce	2.13	4.09		Guest	Recurring	Recurring		
Rey Gallegos	Pedro "Pete" Trujillo	3.01	5.13			Recurring	Recurring	Recurring	
Anthony Fernandez	Pedro "Pete" Trujillo	5.09	–					Guest	
Yuly Mireles	Tina Trujillo	3.01	6.10			Recurring	Recurring	Guest	Guest
Cynthia Rodriguez	Daniella Garcia	3.01	3.07			Recurring			
Tracy Perez	Mercedes Alvarez	3.02	3.07			Recurring			
Heart Hayes	Kai	3.02	3.10			Recurring			
Matthew Fahey	Colby Bennett	3.02	4.06			Recurring	Guest		
Phillip Garcia	Benito "Ox" Oxcama	3.02	3.09			Guest			
Damon Williams	Clark "Linc" Lincoln	3.03	3.10			Recurring			
Denis Leary	Billy	3.04	6.11			Recurring	Guest		Guest
Anthony Konechny	Billy	5.07	6.06					Guest	Guest
Dichen Lachman	Frankie	3.04	5.13			Recurring	Recurring	Recurring	
Eddie Ramos	Tupi	3.13	4.08			Guest	Recurring		
Grant Harvey	Colin	4.01	4.11				Recurring		
Lucca De Oliveira	Louis "Lou" Cano	4.01	4.10				Recurring		
David DeSantos	Dennis Livengood	4.01	5.11				Recurring	Recurring	
Kelli Berglund	Olivia Dunn	4.01	4.10				Recurring		
Emily Deschanel	Angela Kane	4.02	4.13				Recurring		
James Remar	Detective Neil Andre	4.02	4.12				Recurring		
Vinny Chhibber	Rahul	4.02	4.05				Guest		
Milauna Jackson	Pamela "Pam" Johnson	4.06	5.08				Recurring	Recurring	
Charlayne Woodard	Pamela "Pam" Johnson	5.04	5.06					Recurring	
JaCoreyon King	Phoenix Johnson	4.07	–				Guest		
Alimi Ballard	Phoenix Johnson	5.05	5.06					Guest	
Lily Rains	Jess	4.07	5.09				Guest	Guest	
Chris Mulkey	Jed	4.09	4.12				Guest		
Joseph Morgan	Jed	4.09	4.12				Recurring		
Sarah Hunt	Laney	4.09	4.13				Recurring		
Matt Bushell	Odin	4.09	5.01				Guest	Guest	
Boone Nelson	Odin	4.09	–				Guest		
Cody Callahan	Tommy	4.11	6.10				Guest	Recurring	Recurring
Scarlett Abinante	Julia Cody (Note: Also portrayed by an uncredited actress in season 1, episode 1 and by an uncredited infant actress during flashbacks in season 4, episodes 12–13.)	5.01	5.13					Recurring	
Jasper Polish	Julia Cody	6.01	6.13						Recurring
Elliot Knight	Officer Chadwick	5.01	5.12					Recurring	
Ronnie Gene Blevins	Jeremy (Note: Also portrayed by an uncredited child actor during flashbacks in season 4, episode 9.)	5.01	–					Guest	
Nick Heyman	David	5.01	–					Guest	
Nick Stahl	Mike	5.01	–					Guest	
Jalen Thomas Brooks	Blaise	5.04	5.13					Recurring	
Chelsea Tavares	Lark	5.05	6.05					Recurring	Guest
Shakira Barrera	Cassandra	5.06	5.08					Recurring	
Jamie McShane	Max Cross	5.06	5.11					Recurring	
Trent Garrett	Parker Freeman	5.07	5.09					Guest	
Annie Heise	Linda	5.09	5.12					Recurring	
William Russ	Tre	6.01	6.03						Guest
Stevie Lynn Jones	Penny Dean	6.02	6.13						Recurring
Marcus Brown	Vince	6.02	6.10						Recurring
Hans Christopher	Auge	6.02	6.07						Recurring
Verina Banks	Brittany	6.02	6.09						Recurring
Pierson Fodé	Ryan	6.02	6.04						Guest
Moran Atias	Detective Louise Thompson	6.03	6.09						Recurring
Eddie Martinez	Captain Torrez	6.03	6.04						Guest
Alan Trong	Eddie Pham	6.03	6.06						Recurring
Vien Hong	Arthur Pham	6.03	6.06						Recurring
J.D. Walsh	Father Kirby	6.03	6.05						Recurring
Diego Josef	Taylor Cline	6.04	6.09						Recurring
Shannon Walsh	Hannah	6.05	6.06						Guest
Michael Kostroff	David	6.09	6.10						Guest
Andrea Grano	Celia Delacruz	6.10	6.12						Guest

== Main characters ==
- Ellen Barkin as Janine "Smurf" Cody, the tough matriarch of the Cody family and J's estranged grandmother who runs a respected criminal enterprise in Oceanside, California. Smurf is very protective of her family and presents a borderline-incestuous love towards them. She is forced to kill her adopted son Baz after he betrays her and she is briefly confined to jail. She is later diagnosed with terminal cancer and plans an elaborate final job, the bunker heist, to die on her own terms and take at least Pope with her. However, after her sons refuse to go through with it, she is shot dead by J, who fulfilled her wish. (seasons 1–4)
  - Rimea Kasprzak as Teenage Janine "Smurf" Cody, a 13-year-old Smurf in 1966 who witnesses her mother, Miriam Cody, get killed during a robbery gone wrong. (guest season 1)
  - Leila George as Young Janine "Smurf" Cody, a 24-year-old (1977), 31-year-old (1984), 39-year-old (1992) and 46-year-old (1999) Smurf who becomes the leader of a crew of ruthless career criminals who would eventually become the matriarch of the Cody family as she develops her criminal skillset while raising a young family. She eventually disbands her crew and moves to Oceanside where she manages various jobs for her teenage children, Julia, Andrew and Baz, while manipulating them into following in her footsteps. In 1999, she formally cuts ties with Julia after she is caught attempting to rob the Cody family estate, also forcing her sons to do the same. (seasons 5–6; recurring season 4)
- Scott Speedman as Barry "Baz" Blackwell, Smurf's adopted son and J's potential biological father. He is the leader in the Cody family's heists but begins to question how Smurf runs their jobs. He is shown to be neglectful of his long-time girlfriend Catherine and their daughter Lena, often cheating on the former with his recurring fling Lucy. He is later assassinated by Mia Benitez, on Smurf's orders, after he planned to rob Smurf with Lucy and even successfully framed Smurf for the murder of Javi in an attempt to take over leadership. In season 6, flashbacks reveal that Baz abandoned Pope during a bank robbery job, leading to him being incarcerated for three years until his release at the beginning of season 1. Reflecting on these events, Pope hallucinates Baz while in solitary confinement during his imprisonment for Catherine's murder. (seasons 1–3; guest season 6)
  - Reeve Baker as Young Barry "Baz" Blackwell, the 10-year-old son of Linda Blackwell in 1984. (guest season 5)
  - Darren Mann as Teenage Barry "Baz" Blackwell, Smurf's 18-year-old (1992) and 25-year-old (1999) adopted son and the adopted brother of Julia, Andrew, Craig, and Deran who ran away from home and moved into the Cody residence in 1986 at the age of 12. He becomes the shot-caller while on jobs with his adopted siblings and later starts a secret relationship with Julia. After Smurf discovers the relationship, she forces him to move out and he stops seeing Julia. In 1999, he started to pull off higher-risk jobs to make Smurf money. (recurring season 6)
- Shawn Hatosy as Andrew "Pope" Cody, the oldest Cody son, who suffers from mental illness and OCD for most of his life, and even considers suicide. After having served three years in Folsom State Prison, for a bank robbery job gone wrong, he returns to the Cody family. His father, Colin, died before Pope and his twin sister Julia were born. He also had an obsessive infatuation with Baz's girlfriend Catherine, whom Smurf forces him to kill, and later becomes increasingly involved in taking care of his niece, Lena, after she is orphaned. He later goes against Smurf's wishes and puts Lena into the foster care system to protect her from the Cody's criminal lifestyle. While Pope struggles to connect and get close to people, he has had relationships with churchgoer Amy Wheeler and his childhood friend Angela Kane. Catherine's death is later investigated by Detective Louise Thompson, who eventually gets Pope to confess to her murder due to his mounting guilt, and he is incarcerated once again. He later plans with his brothers and J to escape from his imprisonment. During the prison transport heist, Craig and Deran successfully free him and they attempt to escape the country together until they discover that J has betrayed them as the police close in on their location. During a shootout with the police, Pope is shot in the chest while allowing Craig and Deran to flee, but survives, and makes his way to the Cody family estate. He confronts J about his betrayal, and after initially attempting to drown his nephew, instead lets him go after feeling guilty about abandoning Julia during his youth. He then sets fire to the Cody family estate out of anger and collapses poolside clutching a photo of his family, as he succumbs to blood loss from his gunshot wound.
  - Houston Towe as Young Andrew Cody, the 7-year-old twin brother of Julia and Smurf's son in 1984. He is seen to be heavily affected by Smurf's criminal activities. He also appeared briefly in season 4 during flashbacks in 1977, when Smurf gives birth to him and Julia. (recurring season 5)
  - Kevin Csolak as Teenage Andrew "Pope" Cody, the 15-year-old (1992) and 22-year-old (1999) twin brother of Julia, younger adoptive brother of Baz, the older half-brother of Craig and Deran, and Smurf's son. He struggles to find his place in life while maintaining a complicated relationship with his family and a sibling rivalry with Baz, who also gives him his nickname "Pope". In 1999, after stopping a now-pregnant Julia from robbing the Cody family estate he is forced by Smurf to abandon his sister for good. (recurring season 6)
- Ben Robson as Craig Cody, the middle Cody son, who has a predilection for drugs and extremely risky activities. Often unpredictable, and less reliable than his brothers, he finds enjoyment in the criminal lifestyle and throwing parties. His father is Jake Dunmore, a former member of Smurf's criminal gang and her ex-boyfriend, but Craig is unaware of his existence. While he has had numerous flings, including with J's ex-girlfriend Nicky Belmont and the professional thief Frankie, he and his longtime on-again/off-again girlfriend, and former drug dealer, Renn Randall, eventually have a son, Nicholas "Nick" Cody. (Note: Portrayed by multiple uncredited infant actors in seasons 4–6.) This leads Craig to struggle to improve his life by attempting to stay clean for his new family and he eventually proposes to Renn which she happily accepts. Following Pope's incarceration, he and Deran help rescue him during the prison transport heist but they are forced to leave Pope behind after J's betrayal leads to the police discovering them and so Craig and Deran attempt to flee to the Mexico-U.S. border together. While robbing a convenience store to get money to cross the border, Craig is shot in the stomach by the store owner's son and he and Deran steal a truck and drive away. With Craig's condition worsening, Deran is forced to pull over and together they watch the ocean by a cliffside as Craig begs Deran to look after Renn and Nick, before he finally succumbs to blood loss.
  - Oz Kalvan (recurring season 6) and Jack Michael Doke (guest season 6) as Young Craig Cody, the son of Smurf and Jake Dunmore, younger half-brother of Julia and Andrew, the older half-brother of Deran, and younger adoptive brother of Baz in 1992 and 1999.
- Jake Weary as Deran Cody, the youngest Cody son, a former competitive surfer who is not as ruthless as his older brothers but slowly adapts to protect those he cares for. He owns a bar as a legitimate side business in an attempt to distance himself from the Cody family's criminal activities but later uses it to launder money and is eventually forced to sell it. His father is Billy, a low-level criminal whom Smurf had a recurring fling with, and whom Deran is estranged due to his selfish habits. He initially hides the fact that he is gay from his family, but later opens up to them, and they happily accept him. He was in a complicated relationship with fellow surfer Adrian Dolan until they parted ways for his safety, as Adrian was forced to flee the country. He would also have sex with various men to vent his anger and frustrations. After Pope's incarceration, he helps rescue him alongside Craig during the prison transport heist but they are forced to flee after being discovered by the police, due to J's betrayal. With no money to make it across the Mexico-U.S. border, he and Craig attempt to rob a convenience store, leading to Craig being mortally wounded. He later sits by a cliffside watching the ocean with his brother, promising to look after Renn and Nick as Craig succumbs to blood loss.
  - Cyrus Blomberg (recurring season 6) and Dexter Hobert (guest season 6) as Young Deran Cody, the son of Smurf and Billy, younger half-brother of Julia, Andrew, and Craig, and younger adoptive brother of Baz in 1992 and 1999.
- Finn Cole as Joshua "J" Cody, Smurf's grandson who moves in with her and his uncles at the Cody family estate following the death of his mother, Julia Cody, who was Smurf's only daughter and Pope's twin sister. He quickly adapts to the criminal lifestyle, working with his uncles on various jobs and partaking in heists, and is the only one who will challenge Smurf. He slowly becomes more connected in the criminal world, using his intellect to operate numerous side businesses to launder money, and works with criminals outside of the family while becoming more ruthless in his actions. Smurf claims that J's biological father is Baz, but it is later revealed during flashbacks that Julia does not know who J's father is. J has been in multiple relationships, most notably with his high school girlfriend Nicky Belmont, reckless gang member Mia Benitez, college student Olivia Dunn, and legal secretary Penny Dean. J eventually grows resentful of his uncles for their past treatment of his mother Julia, and seeing an opportunity to cut and run, he abandons his uncles during the prison transport heist to rescue Pope, sabotages their vehicles, steals all their money and weapons and notifies the police of their location. Feeling betrayed, Pope later attempts to drown J for his actions but ultimately lets him go. J is then able to flee the country and escape to the Virgin Islands with all of his family's money, now alone.
- Daniella Alonso as Catherine Belen, Baz's girlfriend, and the mother of their daughter, Lena Blackwell. She later became a criminal informant, working closely with Officer Patrick Fischer, but never implicated any of the Codys in any crimes. She is then smothered to death by Pope on Smurf's orders, who thought that Catherine was going to betray them. Her body is later discovered by the Oceanside police after having been buried by Pope years prior. Initially believed to be a cold case, her murder is investigated by Detective Louise Thompson who focuses her efforts on the Codys and eventually gets Pope to confess. (season 1)
- Molly Gordon as Nicky Belmont, J's girlfriend and fellow high school student who becomes close with the Codys. Although initially unaware of the Cody family's criminal activities, she becomes more corrupted and rebellious after being increasingly associated with them. She later moves in with the Codys, against her father's wishes, has a recurring fling with Craig, and even participates in the yacht heist. She eventually turns to heroin and after seriously injuring herself, J abandons her outside a hospital. She soon leaves Oceanside and goes to live with her parents in Guam and is later mentioned to have gotten married there. (seasons 1–3)
- Carolina Guerra as Lucy, Baz's mistress from Mexico with whom he has a recurring romance. She is also the head of a Mexican gang with her brother Marco and is the mother of Carlos, whose father is potentially Baz. After Baz attempts to take over the leadership of his family, she helps him rob Smurf but flees after Baz is killed, taking the money with her. She later professes her innocence over Baz's death but is soon targeted by Smurf who seeks revenge and her money returned. After Marco is killed, she reaches a truce with Smurf but is later assassinated by Mia Benitez, on Smurf's orders. (seasons 2–3; recurring season 1)
- Sohvi Rodriguez as Mia Benitez, a tough young woman raised in a gang, led by her cousin Pete Trujillo, who is very rough around the edges. She later grows closer to the Cody's, becoming romantically involved with J, and has a mysterious and dangerous nightlife. She also acts as an assassin for Smurf on two occasions, killing both Baz and Lucy for her. After having a falling out with J, she robs the Cody's with her boyfriend Tupi after they complete the performance venue heist. She is later confronted about the robbery by Pete and is shot dead by J in retaliation after she first admits to killing Baz. (season 4; recurring season 3)
- Jack Conley as Jake Dunmore, a former member of Smurf's crew and Craig's father, who first introduced Smurf to the criminal lifestyle. Craig remains unaware of his father's identity as Jake is kept out of his life by Smurf. He is later present at Smurf's funeral alongside Smurf's former associate Billy. Following Smurf's death, he is the only member of Smurf's crew still alive. (guest seasons 1, 4; recurring season 2)
  - Jon Beavers as Young Jake Dunmore, a member of Smurf's crew of ruthless career criminals from 1977 to 1984 and her on-again/off-again boyfriend. He also has a fatherly role in taking care of Andrew and Julia. He eventually has a son with Smurf, Craig, but is not allowed to have contact with him, so he leaves Oceanside when Smurf's crew disbands. (season 5; recurring season 4)
- Rigo Sanchez as Young Manny, the leader of Smurf's crew of ruthless career criminals from 1977 to 1984. After Smurf's crew disbands, he goes on to establish a new crew. He also briefly appeared in season 2 in the present day shortly before dying from cancer. He also implicated Smurf in the death of Lou, a former member of their crew, through confession tapes he made. (season 5; recurring season 4)

== Supporting characters ==
- Aamya Deva Keroles as Lena Blackwell, Baz and Catherine's young daughter who is unaware of her family's criminal activities. After her mother's death, she is mainly cared for by Pope due to Baz's consistent absence. When she is later orphaned following Baz's assassination, Pope places her into foster care, against Smurf's wishes, and she is later successfully adopted by another family. Years later, Detective Thompson visits Lena during her investigation into Catherine's murder and learns from her that Pope was the last person to see Catherine alive. (seasons 1–3; guest seasons 4, 6)
- C. Thomas Howell as Lieutenant Commander Paul Belmont, a United States Navy Lieutenant Commander at Camp Pendleton, and Nicky's father. He is blackmailed by Baz to provide the Codys with insider knowledge to pull off the Camp Pendleton heist. He later leaves Oceanside without Nicky when he is transferred to another military base in Guam, later briefly returning to Oceanside to take Nicky home with him after she is hospitalized. (season 1; guest season 3)
- Spencer Treat Clark as Adrian Dolan, Deran's on-again/off-again boyfriend who is a competitive surfer who owns a surfboard shop and is initially unaware of Deran's criminal activities. He is eventually caught smuggling drugs stored inside his surfboards and is investigated by the DEA agent Dennis Livengood. With Deran's help, he flees the country to lie low in Indonesia but permanently ends his relationship with Deran. (seasons 1–4)
- Christina Ochoa as Renn Randall, Craig's on-again/ off-again girlfriend and an experienced cocaine dealer, with Craig as one of her many clients. Their relationship becomes strained after Craig leaves her for dead, believing she has overdosed. She later rekindles her relationship with Craig, and after a recurring fling, she eventually becomes pregnant with Craig's child, Nick Cody. After giving birth to Nick, she struggles to maintain her clientele and helps the Codys by participating in the skate park heist. After Nick is rescued from a rival group of neo-Nazi drug dealers, feeling unsafe in Oceanside, she leaves with Nick and moves to live in Singapore with Craig supporting them financially, and later accepts his marriage proposal. However, Craig is killed following the prison transport heist, although Deran had promised Craig that he would travel to Singapore and look after Renn and Nick as they are family.
- Ellen Wroe as Alexa Anderson, J and Nicky's high school teacher, who is forced to work undercover with Detective Yates to try to take down the Codys, who believe that J is the weak link. After trying to get close to J, she starts a sexual relationship with him. After she reveals to J that she is working with the police, J exposes her sexual relationship with him and she is arrested for statutory rape, foiling Yates' investigation. (season 1)
- Dorian Missick as Officer Patrick Fischer, a tough police officer in the Oceanside Police Department working with Detective Yates to investigate the Codys. He befriends Catherine and brings her in as a criminal informant, hoping she'll implicate the Codys, specifically Baz, for the sake of her daughter. His friendship with Catherine unintentionally causes her death, after Smurf finds out that Catherine was working with him. He later investigates her disappearance, believing that Baz had her murdered. Years later, during Detective Thompson's investigation, he is mentioned by his ex-wife to have left Oceanside and moved to Denver. (season 1; guest season 2)
- Michael Bowen as Vin, a man previously incarcerated with Pope in Folsom State Prison who wants to join the Codys on jobs but is openly refused by Smurf. He is later framed by Smurf for Catherine's disappearance and is brutally beaten by Baz, and seemingly killed by Pope. However, years later, he is back in prison and is visited by Detective Thompson, who enquires about Pope's relationship with Catherine. (season 1; guest season 6)
- Joseph Julian Soria as Marco, Lucy's brother, and the second-in-command of her gang, who deals drugs across the US-Mexico border. He also later helps the Codys by participating in the yacht heist. He is later kidnapped and tortured by Smurf for helping Lucy take the money that Baz stole from her and is shot dead by Craig during a shootout between the Codys and Lucy's gang that Marco instigated in revenge for his torture. (seasons 2–3; guest season 1)
- Alvaro Martinez as Carlos, Lucy's son, whose father is potentially Baz, who is protected from her criminal activities. He later witnesses his mother's assassination but is spared by Mia. (guest seasons 1–3)
- Nicki Micheaux as Detective Sandra Yates, a detective in the Oceanside P.D. working with Officer Fischer to investigate the Codys. She attempts to use high school teacher Alexa Anderson to get close to J and get information from him that can implicate the Codys in their criminal activities. After Alexa is arrested, her investigation into the Codys is halted. (season 1)
- Will Brandt as Brandon Randall, One of Renn's cousins who, alongside his brothers, kidnaps and holds Craig for ransom after he left Renn for dead. Years later, he returns to Oceanside to help Renn take care of Nick. (guest seasons 1, 6)
- Ray Baker as Isaiah, the ex-boyfriend of Miriam, Smurf's mother, who left her for dead in the 1960s during a robbery gone wrong. He also gave Smurf her nickname due to her love of swimming until she turned blue. In the present day, Smurf tracks him down and takes revenge for her mother's death by shooting him dead. (guest season 1)
- Dennis Cockrum as Ray Blackwell, Baz's estranged father who lives in solitude and physically abused his son when he was young, causing him to run away from home. (guest seasons 1–2)
- Alex Meraz as Javier "Javi" Cano, the leader of a dangerous Mexican gang, formerly led by Manny, that Smurf worked with while her sons were too young to pull off heists. He is the son of Lou, who was a member of Smurf's crew until he supposedly died during a failed bank job. Javi continuously causes problems for the Codys, correctly believing that Smurf had a role in his father's death. Javi is later betrayed and murdered by his second-in-command Deek after Smurf pays him and the rest of Javi's gang off. Baz later frames Smurf for Javi's murder resulting in her imprisonment but the charges are later dropped due to a lack of evidence. (season 2)
- Jennifer Landon as Amy Wheeler, an employee at an Oceanside megachurch whom Pope meets and briefly dates, gaining insider knowledge to pull off the megachurch heist. While she initially continues her relationship with Pope after the megachurch heist, she grows increasingly scared of him due to his mental state and after Pope confesses to her that he murdered Catherine, she forces him to leave, ending their relationship. Years later, having left the megachurch and had a son, she reconciles with Pope and rekindles a friendship with him until his incarceration, where she is placed into witness protection. (season 2; guest seasons 3, 6)
- Karina Logue as Gia, an experienced criminal fence and owner of "Gia's Persian Rugs" which she uses as a front to sell stolen goods. She has worked with Smurf for many years but dislikes dealing with the rest of the Cody family. After refusing to work with the Codys following Smurf's death, they burn down her store and warehouse to send a message. (guest seasons 2, 4, 6)
  - Kristi Lauren as Young Gia, a low-level fence who helps Smurf sell stolen items that Andrew, Julia, and Baz steal. (guest season 6)
- Tembi Locke as Monica, a smart, low-key woman who is the technical brains of Gia's criminal operation that the Codys rely on to fence their stolen goods. (guest season 2)
- Bernardo Badillo as Deek, the second-in-command of Javi's gang. He is paid off by Smurf to betray and kill Javi, who had become a problem for her and the rest of the Codys. (season 2)
- Andy Favreau as Mark Liston, a powerful businessman whom the Codys encounter at the megachurch, and who has a brief fling with Deran. (guest season 2)
- Amanda Payton as Dana, a waitress working on a yacht who befriends Craig while he is working there as an inside man for the yacht heist. (guest season 2)
- Laura San Giacomo as Morgan Wilson, Smurf's lawyer who helps run her legitimate businesses. While Smurf is in jail, she is forced to work with J to settle financial matters. She is also manipulated by J, who steals from Smurf's businesses and frames Morgan for it. He later stages her death by taking her out to sea, cutting her several times to cause severe blood loss, and leaving her in the water to eventually drown, becoming the first person that J kills. (seasons 2–3)
  - Jamie Renée Smith as Young Morgan Wilson, a lawyer whom Smurf meets with to help keep Andrew and Julia out of trouble. (guest season 6)
- Gil Birmingham as Detective Pearce, an unflappable high-ranking law enforcement officer in the Oceanside P.D. with a dry sense of humor and more than twenty years on the job. He is constantly trying to bring down the Codys, placing pressure on both Smurf, after her incarceration, and Adrian, after he is investigated by Agent Livengood and the DEA. After Smurf's death, he is no longer investigating the Cody's criminal activities. Years later, during Detective Thompson's investigation, he is mentioned to have retired from police work. (seasons 3–4; guest season 2)
- Rey Gallegos as Pedro "Pete" Trujillo, the current leader of a gang of criminals that have operated in Oceanside for decades. His sister Tina and cousin Mia are also members of his gang. He is a longtime associate of Smurf's and helps her facilitate the assassinations of Baz and Lucy. Following Smurf's death, he continues a working relationship with J but grows to not trust the Codys without Smurf in charge due to the power struggle between them. He also provides the Codys with the mountainside heist to steal bricks of cocaine from a crashed airplane but later betrays them, secretly keeping the take for himself, and in retaliation, his left eye is ripped out by Pope. Seeking revenge, he later plants multiple members of his gang in prison when Pope is incarcerated, but they are unsuccessful in taking him out. (seasons 3–5)
  - Anthony Fernandez as Young Pedro "Pete" Trujillo, a member of a gang of criminals led by his father "Big Pete" in 1984. (guest season 5)
- Yuly Mireles as Tina Trujillo, a high-ranking member of Pete's criminal gang and his younger sister who is planted in jail to get Smurf to pay the money she owed to Pete for Baz's assassination. She is later released and tracks down Lucy's gang to kidnap Marco as part of Smurf's plan to retrieve her money and get revenge. After Pete's eye is ripped out by Pope, she informs the Codys that her gang plans to seek revenge while Pete recovers, leading to Pope being shanked in prison, which he ultimately survives. (seasons 3–4; guest seasons 5–6)
- Cynthia Rodriguez as Daniella Garcia, an inmate who, after being paid by J, acts as Smurf's protector while in jail until her release. (season 3)
- Tracy Perez as Mercedes Alvarez, an inmate who was arrested for armed robbery. While in jail, she proposes the pill mill heist to Smurf, which the Codys later undertake but keep all of the score. (season 3)
- Heart Hayes as Kai, the former bartender at Deran's Bar, who is later replaced by Tommy. (season 3)
- Matthew Fahey as Colby Bennett, a member of Deran's gang while Smurf is in jail. After getting dissatisfied with Deran disbanding their gang, he recklessly leads his own job which causes Ox's death. He later attempts to blackmail Deran after discovering that Adrian is being investigated by the DEA, but Deran shoots him in the chest, killing him, and Pope helps him get rid of the body. Deran subsequently struggles with guilt over Colby's death as he is the first person that he has killed. Following Pope's incarceration, he leads the police to Colby's body in exchange for a prison transfer and takes credit for Colby's death. (season 3; guest season 4)
- Phillip Garcia as Benito "Ox" Oxcama, a childhood friend of Deran's and member of his gang while Smurf is in jail. During a robbery gone wrong, he is shot in the gut and ultimately dies of his wounds after a failed attempt to save his life in Mexico. Detective Pearce later reveals to Adrian that the police found Ox's body in a Mexican landfill and they incorrectly suspected Deran of killing him. (season 3)
- Damon Williams as Clark "Linc" Lincoln, a former motocross rider and X Games participant who now works as an ER nurse and had a fling with Deran. (season 3)
- Denis Leary as Billy, a low-level criminal and Deran's drifter father whom Smurf worked with for some time but kicked out years ago. He returns to Oceanside and the Codys with his new girlfriend, Frankie, to propose the airplane heist, which he also participates in, and skips town after receiving his cut. He is later present at Smurf's funeral alongside Smurf's former associate Jake Dunmore. Deran later seeks his help to break Pope out of prison and, although Billy has his reservations, he provides Deran with a contact within the prison that can help them out. (season 3; guest seasons 4, 6)
  - Anthony Konechny as Young Billy, an associate of the criminal Max Cross in 1984, who has a recurring fling with Smurf, leading to her having a son, Deran. In 1992 he continued to work with Smurf on various jobs. (guest seasons 5–6)
- Dichen Lachman as Frankie, a professional thief and Billy's edgy, free-spirited, and dangerous younger ex-girlfriend who joins him when he goes to Oceanside seeking out the Codys. She initially uses Billy to get close to Smurf to use the Codys for her own jobs. She later has a recurring fling with Craig, and they take on several small jobs together using her wide range of criminal connections. She provides the Codys with heists after Billy skips town, specifically, the museum and Hawala heists. After the hawala heist, she takes her cut, leaves Oceanside, and moves to Costa Rica. (seasons 3–5)
- Eddie Ramos as Tupi, the dangerous, money-hungry boyfriend of Mia who reunites with her after being released from prison and wants to return to working with her and Pete's criminal gang. He strongly dislikes J and tries to keep him and Mia apart, later convincing her to betray J. He and Mia later successfully rob the Codys after the performance venue heist but after J informs Pete about the betrayal, Pete angrily executes Tupi as punishment. (season 4; guest season 3)
- Grant Harvey as Colin, a violent ex-Vietnam War veteran and a member of Smurf's crew of ruthless career criminals in 1977. He dated Smurf after she joined the crew and helped her develop her skills to become a better criminal. He is also Pope and Julia's father, but while Smurf is pregnant with them, he is shot in the leg during a shootout with the police and quickly bleeds to death. (season 4)
- Lucca De Oliveira as Louis “Lou” Cano, a member of Smurf's crew of ruthless career criminals in 1977. He eventually has a son, Javi, but is later killed by Smurf's Crew after a failed bank job when Javi was a child. According to Manny's version of events, Smurf shot him in the back of the head. According to Smurf's, he was mortally wounded during the job and Manny performed a mercy kill with Smurf's gun. In the present, his body is recovered and cremated by the Codys. (season 4)
- David DeSantos as Dennis Livengood, a DEA agent who investigates Adrian following his arrest for drug smuggling. He attempts to make a deal with Adrian for information on other criminals, putting him in danger after the Codys find out. After Adrian flees the country, Dennis shifts his focus to the Codys and their associates, specifically Deran. He is later shot in the back of the head by Officer Chadwick, who kills Dennis in an attempt to force the Codys to pay him more money for his silence and for ending his investigation into their criminal activities. (seasons 4–5)
- Kelli Berglund as Olivia Dunn, a charming college student who shares a class with J. After a brief relationship, J uses her insider knowledge to pull off the performance venue heist. She later discovers that he is responsible for robbing the performance venue and attempts to blackmail him, but J threatens her in return and she backs down. In season 5, J claims that Olivia was kicked out of school, disowned, forced to live on the streets, and died of a cocaine overdose. (season 4)
- Emily Deschanel as Angela Kane, a recovering heroin addict, and Julia's former best friend. She reenters the lives of the Codys, rekindling her childhood friendship with Pope, leading them to bond over memories of Julia. In an attempt to get her out of Pope's life, believing she is a bad influence, J causes her to relapse. She later goes missing and is mentioned to have been beaten to death in a drug house. Her death causes Pope to have a mental breakdown. (season 4)
- James Remar as Neil Andre, a retired police detective in the Oceanside P.D. who acts as an informant for Smurf, having worked with her for many years. (season 4)
- Vinny Chhibber as Rahul, a haughty billionaire and associate of Frankie who provides Craig with the museum heist. After refusing to pay the Codys the agreed-upon amount for the job, they rob him. (guest season 4)
- Milauna Jackson as Young Pamela “Pam” Johnson, Phoenix's mother and briefly Jake's girlfriend in 1977 who robs Smurf's crew. She is later tracked down by Smurf and after befriending her, helps her commit robberies and raise Andrew and Julia until she leaves in 1984. (seasons 4–5)
  - Charlayne Woodard as Pamela "Pam" Johnson, an older Pam in the present day and a former associate of Smurf whom she left all of her money and assets in her will, including the Cody family estate. She provides the Codys with the skate park heist, to retrieve evidence that her son Phoenix is being blackmailed, in exchange for their estate back, which is ultimately successful. (season 5)
- JaCoreyon King as Young Phoenix Johnson, Pamela's young son who briefly lives with her and Smurf's crew in 1977. (guest season 4)
  - Alimi Ballard as Phoenix Johnson, the son of Pamela Johnson and a former professional skater, who is being blackmailed by his former manager, leading to the Codys taking on the skate park heist. (guest season 5)
- Lily Rains as Jess, Adrian's older sister who attempts to protect him from both the Codys and the DEA. (guest seasons 4–5)
- Chris Mulkey as Jed, Pope and Julia's paternal uncle and a survivalist who lives off-the-grid with his four sons who together have amassed a great wealth that's stored in a bunker underground. He is shot dead by Smurf during the bunker heist as revenge for him brutally assaulting her in 1977. (guest season 4)
  - Joseph Morgan as Young Jed, Colin's unstable brother who is a survivalist in 1977, living off-the-grid with his wife Laney and his sons. After learning of his brother's death, he brutally assaults Smurf while she is heavily pregnant with Colin's children, Andrew and Julia. (season 4)
- Sarah Hunt as Laney, Jed's abused wife in 1977 who befriends Smurf and helps her give birth to Andrew and Julia after Smurf was assaulted by Jed. She is the mother of his four sons: Odin, Jeremy, David, and Mike. She is later mentioned by Jed in the present day to have since died. (season 4)
- Matt Bushell as Odin, Jed's oldest son and de facto leader of the brothers after their father's death. He and his brothers plan to take revenge on the Codys for Smurf killing their father. He and his brothers later assault the Cody family estate, where he is drowned by Pope in their swimming pool. (guest seasons 4–5)
  - Boone Nelson as Young Odin, the oldest child of Jed and Laney in 1977. (guest season 4)
- Cody Callahan as Tommy, the former manager and bartender at Deran's bar. After gaining Deran's trust, he helps him launder money through the bar, becoming increasingly involved with criminal activities. Hoping to prove himself to the Codys, he provides them with a smash and grab job at a dentist's office, where he is coached by J and Deran on how to be a better thief, although he severely injures himself in the process. He is later fired by Deran for his recklessness, shortly before the bar is closed down. (seasons 5–6; guest season 4)
- Scarlett Abinante as Young Julia Cody, the 7-year-old twin sister of Andrew and Smurf's daughter in 1984. Her father, Colin, died before Andrew and Julia were born. Unlike her brother, she is seen to dislike Smurf's criminal activities. She briefly appeared in season 1 in the present day, now estranged from her family and J's mother, before dying of a heroin overdose which leads to J moving in with the rest of the Codys. She also appeared briefly in season 4 during flashbacks in 1977, when Smurf gives birth to her and Andrew. (season 5)
  - Jasper Polish as Teenage Julia Cody, the 15-year-old (1992) and 22-year-old (1999) twin sister of Andrew, the younger adoptive sister of Baz, older half-sister of Craig and Deran, and Smurf's daughter. She becomes increasingly rebellious against Smurf, seeking a normal life away from running jobs with her brothers. She is very protective of Andrew, and later starts a secret relationship with Baz until he is forced to leave her due to Smurf's interference. After Julia steals Smurf's money from multiple jobs, she kicks Julia out of the Cody family estate which leads to the start of her future heroin addiction. In 1999, after having been in rehab, a heavily pregnant Julia breaks into the Cody family estate and is caught by Andrew. Smurf uses this action to formally cut ties with her daughter for good and despite Julia's pleas, Andrew follows Smurf's orders and decides to abandon his sister, which he comes to regret many years later. (season 6)
- Elliot Knight as Officer Chadwick, a police officer in the Oceanside P.D. who acts as an informant for the Codys. He later proves to be unstable, by setting up and murdering Agent Livengood, who was investigating the Codys at the time, and demands greater monetary compensation for his continued silence, so the Codys cut ties with him. During Detective Thompson's investigation, it was mentioned he left Oceanside and relocated east. (season 5)
- Ronnie Gene Blevins as Jeremy, Jed's second-oldest son. When he and his brothers assault the Cody family estate, he is choked to death by Craig. He briefly appeared in season 4 as a young child in 1977. (guest season 5)
- Nick Heyman as David, Jed's third-oldest son. When he and his brothers assault the Cody family estate, he is shot in the neck by Deran and bleeds to death. He briefly appeared in season 4 as a young child in 1977. (guest season 5)
- Nick Stahl as Mike, Jed's youngest son who's more level-headed than his brothers. His life is spared by Pope after Mike's brothers were killed when they assaulted the Cody family estate. (guest season 5)
- Jalen Thomas Brooks as Blaise, an associate of Renn who Craig initially hires to babysit his son Nick but soon becomes friends with. (season 5)
- Chelsea Tavares as Lark, the granddaughter of Pamela Johnson and Phoenix Johnson's niece who does business with the Codys on Pam's behalf. She later has a recurring fling with J after working closely with him but breaks it off after he reveals he has started a relationship with Penny. (season 5; guest season 6)
- Shakira Barrera as Cassandra, a member of the Kinship of Light & Truth cult who befriends Pope in the California desert after he had a mental breakdown. He later kidnaps Cassandra's ex-husband, with whom she is in a custody battle over their son, in an attempt to force him to allow her to regain visitation rights, scaring Cassandra and causing her to leave him. (season 5)
- Jamie McShane as Max Cross, a criminal based in Oceanside in 1984 whose territory is infringed by Smurf and her crew. He is later shot dead by Smurf after he continually threatens her and her children. Smurf and her crew subsequently take over his territory for themselves. (season 5)
- Trent Garrett as Parker Freeman, the owner of Deran's rival bar, "Son of a Beach", who is one of many people who moved to Oceanside from Los Angeles. After Parker's bar "steals" Deran's customers, Deran openly attempts to sabotage his business to keep his own running. He later sells the bar due to Deran's interference, and it is replaced by the "4814 Diner". (guest season 5)
- Annie Heise as Linda Blackwell, a strip club dancer in 1984 and the biological mother of Baz. Smurf also attempts to use her insider knowledge to rob Max Cross. (season 5)
- William Russ as Tre, a regular at Deran's Bar and the owner of a surfboard shop who is concerned with the gentrification happening in Oceanside. After helping Tre by scaring off a group of social media influencers, he gifts Deran a rare 1976 Lightning Bolt surfboard, which he subsequently hangs in his bar. (guest season 6)
- Stevie Lynn Jones as Penny Dean, a secretary at a law firm whose husband, Noah Dean, is deployed overseas. She later becomes close with J after working together and they have a recurring fling but attempts to break it off when her husband returns home. Seeking to escape from her husband and her drug-addicted sister Cindy, she continues to indulge J's advances and starts a secret relationship with him, later officially leaving her husband for J and after helping J and the Codys liquidate their assets, she decides to flee the country with him. Following J abandoning his uncles during the prison transport heist, Penny becomes scared of J after he forces her to lie to the police about his whereabouts and she refuses to flee to the Virgin Islands with him. Now believing her untrustworthy, J regrettably poisons her drink and she soon succumbs to its effects. (season 6)
- Marcus Brown as Vince, the owner of a bike-repair shop and a former addict who runs into Craig at his newly-owned gym where they bond over their troubled pasts. He is also a low-level criminal, committing numerous petty robberies with fellow bikers, and later gets Craig to join them. After Craig relapses, Vince attempts to get him to join a backyard fight club for fellow addicts to avoid further slip-ups, but instead, Craig cuts ties with him. (season 6)
- Hans Christopher as Auge, a carpenter whom Pope pays to help him build a small private skate park on the plot of land he owns. After failing to stop locals from using the ramps, he later convinces Pope to allow teenagers, including Taylor, to access the skate park, and he continues to build and maintain it. (season 6)
- Verina Banks as Brittany, the receptionist at Craig's newly opened gym. (season 6)
- Pierson Fodé as Ryan, a businessman from San Diego who briefly dates Deran. He later ends their relationship after Deran brutally beats a man for insulting them. (guest season 6)
- Moran Atias as Detective Louise Thompson, a detective who was relocated to a cold case unit in the Riverside County P.D. after she got a criminal informant killed. In her relentless pursuit of the killer of Catherine Belen, she put the Codys in her crosshairs. Her investigation into Catherine's death leads her to focus on Pope as her prime suspect, with her visiting people from Pope's past including his niece Lena and former cellmate Vin and even blackmailing the teenager Taylor into befriending him. After Pope turns himself in for assaulting Taylor, she successfully convinces him to confess to murdering Catherine, and he is incarcerated. (season 6)
- Eddie Martinez as Captain Torrez, the head of a cold case unit in the Riverside P.D. and Detective Thompson's superior. (guest season 6)
- Alan Trong as Eddie Pham, a high-end jeweler and owner of "Eddie Pham Designs", a luxury jewelry design store, which the Codys scope out for the jewelry heist. After he loans several pieces of expensive jewelry to celebrity singer Brock Fellows for a birthday party, they are successfully stolen by the Codys and replaced with fakes. (season 6)
- Vien Hong as Arthur Pham, a gem expert who works with his half-brother Eddie. After being repeatedly treated badly by Eddie, he provides the Codys with insider knowledge to steal his brother's jewelry for a cut of the take but later comes to regret his decision for having betrayed his brother. (season 6)
- J.D. Walsh as Father Kirby, the priest at an Oceanside church who Andrew befriends in 1992. After joining a bible study group, Andrew is forced by Smurf to rob Kirby's rectory with Baz. Andrew's attendance at Father Kirby's church leads to his life-long nickname of "Pope". (season 6)
- Diego Josef as Taylor Cline, a teen skateboarder who is being bullied at Pope's skate park. Pope encourages Taylor to stand up for himself and looks after him as Taylor is estranged from his family. He is also secretly working as a plant for Detective Thompson, who is blackmailing him while he is on probation, so he can befriend Pope. When Pope later discovers his deception, he brutally assaults Taylor, leading to Pope turning himself in to the police. (season 6)
- Shannon Walsh as Hannah, the organizer at Brock Fellows party, who Deran and Pope use to gain entrance during the jewelry heist. (guest season 6)
- Michael Kostroff as David, a criminal defense lawyer that represents Pope both before and during his incarceration. (guest season 6)
- Andrea Grano as Celia Delacruz, a criminal defense lawyer who represents Pope during his incarceration. (guest season 6)
