= John Erick Dowdle =

American film director (born 1972)

- Born: December 9, 1972 (age 53); Saint Paul, Minnesota, U.S.
- Occupations: Film director, screenwriter
- Years active: 1996–present
- Spouse: Stacy Chbosky (m. 2005)
- Relatives: Stephen Chbosky (brother-in-law)

John Erick Dowdle (born December 9, 1972) is an American film director and screenwriter, best known for horror films. He usually works with his brother Drew Dowdle as a producer and co-screenwriter.

== Early life ==
Dowdle grew up in the Twin Cities of Minnesota. After graduating from the St. Thomas Academy, an all-boys, military, Catholic high school, Dowdle moved to Iowa City, Iowa to attend the University of Iowa where he joined the fraternity, Lambda Chi Alpha. He would then make the move from writing to film. Two years later, Dowdle moved to Manhattan, New York City to attend New York University's film program.

== Career ==
After graduating from NYU, Dowdle moved to Los Angeles to pursue a career in filmmaking. Dowdle wrote and directed his first feature, the 1996 film Full Moon Rising, when he was just out of college. For his sophomore effort, The Dry Spell, Dowdle was joined by his younger brother Drew, who produced the film as John wrote, directed and edited. They now live in Los Angeles, working together as The Brothers Dowdle.

With his brother Drew Dowdle as a producer and/or co-screenwriter, John Erick Dowdle directed the horror films Quarantine, Devil, based on a storybook from M. Night Shyamalan, and As Above, So Below, as well as the 2015 thriller film No Escape, starring Owen Wilson and Pierce Brosnan.

He was announced to direct the movie adaptation of Jack Kilburn's novel Afraid.

In 2017, Dowdle co-created the miniseries Waco with his brother, which aired on Paramount Network in 2018.

In March 2018, the Dowdle brothers announced they were developing a movie or basic cable presentation about newspaper columnist Dorothy Kilgallen, who died in 1965 under circumstances they contend were never satisfactorily resolved.

== Personal life ==
Dowdle is married to Stacy Chbosky, sister of director and author Stephen Chbosky.

== Filmography ==
Film

Year	Title	Director	Writer	Notes
1996	Full Moon Rising	Yes	Yes	Also producer
2005	The Dry Spell	Yes	Yes	Also editor
2007	The Poughkeepsie Tapes	Yes	Yes	Also editor
2008	Quarantine	Yes	Yes	
2010	Devil	Yes	No	
2014	As Above, So Below	Yes	Yes	
2015	No Escape	Yes	Yes	
TBA	Doctor Caligari's Cabinet of Wonders	Yes	Yes	Post-production

Television

Year	Title	Director	Writer	Executive Producer	Developer	Notes
2018	Waco	Yes	Yes	Yes	Yes	Directed 4 episodes
2021	Joe Pickett	Yes	Yes	Yes	No	Directed 2 episodes
2023	Waco: The Aftermath	Yes	Yes	Yes	Yes	Directed 3 episodes
2026	Marshals	Yes	No	No	No	Directed 2 episodes
