= Brad Branch =

American Branch Davidian

Brad Eugene Branch (born c. 1960) is an American former Branch Davidian who was charged and convicted of aiding and abetting voluntary manslaughter of federal agents during the 1993 Waco siege and weapons charges. He was sentenced to ten years in prison for the voluntary manslaughter charge and thirty years for the weapons charges. Originally, the charge of carrying a firearm during a violent crime was based on a conspiracy to murder charge, on which Branch and other Davidians were acquitted, but federal prosecutors asked U.S. District Judge Walter Smith to reinstate the weapons charges, which he did. The Branch Davidians, including Brad Branch, attempted to appeal the charges, but the appeals were turned down in 1997. The United States Supreme Court agreed to hear appellate arguments from the Branch Davidians, including Branch, in 2000. In response to the Supreme Court's ruling that Smith overstepped his power in his sentencing, he reduced his and other Davidians' sentences to five years for the weapons charges.

During the February 28, 1993, shootout that began the siege, Branch reportedly shot and killed a Bureau of Alcohol, Tobacco, and Firearms agent, shouting that he "got one!" Branch Davidian Marjorie Thomas testified that she heard Branch and Kevin Whitecliff, another Branch Davidian, admitting they shot at agents during the shootout. Another Davidian, Victorine Hollingsworth, testified she also heard Branch and Livingstone Fagan discuss firing on agents on February 28, 1993. After the shootout, he, Whitecliff, and Oliver Gyarfas were sent out of the compound to dig a grave for Peter Gent, who died in the shootout. Branch had indicated to federal authorities that he wished to exit Mount Carmel Center during the siege on March 11, 1993. He left the compound with Whitecliff with permission from Branch Davidian leader David Koresh on March 19, 1993. The only reason that the Federal Bureau of Investigation (FBI) received for why they left when they did was because before then "it wasn't time". While jailed after leaving the compound, Branch told NBC that David Koresh sought to challenge other Christian leaders to see who can "reveal the book", meaning the Bible. Also while in jail, Brad Branch told CNN that the April 19 fire that destroyed the Mount Carmel compound was a "systematic assassination by the FBI to eliminate all of the crime scene". Branch soon after the siege also believed that Koresh was not responsible for the fire.

Branch was released from prison in 2006 and lived in the San Antonio area as of 2012. Branch was an aircraft electrician from San Antonio, Texas, before becoming a Branch Davidian.
