= David Thibodeau =

Former Branch Davidian and musician

David Thibodeau (born February 13, 1969) is an American Branch Davidian, a survivor of the Waco siege, and a musician. He was born in Bangor, Maine. In early adulthood, Thibodeau sought to become a musician in Los Angeles, California, where he converted to Branch Davidianism after meeting David Koresh in a Guitar Center in 1990. Thibodeau was present at the Mt. Carmel compound on February 28, 1993, when the Bureau of Alcohol, Tobacco, and Firearms (ATF) conducted a botched raid. He stayed for the 51-day siege before escaping with eight other survivors prior to the fire consuming the compound.

== Life before Branch Davidianism ==
Thibodeau was born in Bangor, Maine, to Balenda (incorrectly reported as "Belenda" in the Waco Tribune-Herald) Ganem. His parents divorced after he graduated from Bangor High School in 1987. He lived with his single mother in Bangor and Portland, Maine before moving to Los Angeles in 1990 to pursue a music career. In the late 1980s, he attended Musicians Institute of Technology to study drumming.

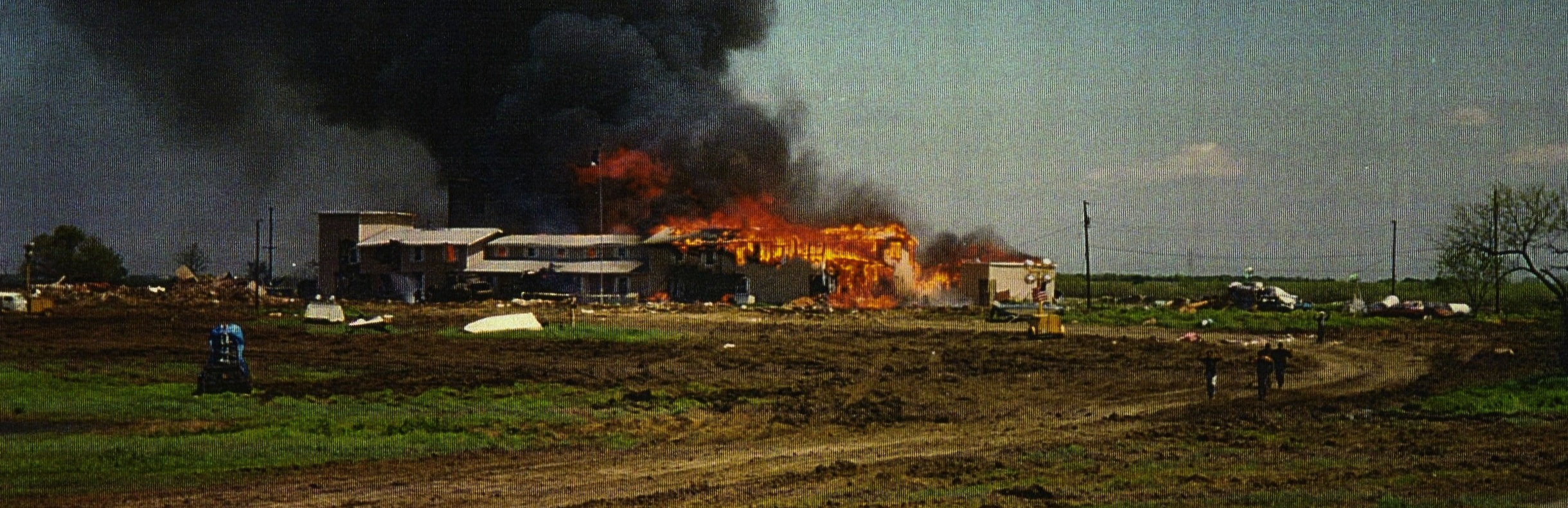
Surrender of four Branch Davidians. Thibodeau is one of the three figures closest to the camera on the road.

== Conversion and the Waco siege ==
Thibodeau met David Koresh in the Sunset Boulevard Guitar Center in Los Angeles, California in 1990. Reportedly, Thibodeau did not show much interest in the group originally since they were a Christian band but eventually joined because of people like Steve Schneider. He moved to the Mount Carmel Center in 1991 to continue playing in the Branch Davidians' band.

At the Mount Carmel Center near Waco, Texas, Thibodeau married Michele Jones upon Koresh's request.

Thibodeau escaped the April 19, 1993, fire that ended the Waco siege along with eight other survivors. Thibodeau was jailed in McLennan County Jail but soon released on a US$5,000 bail by a federal magistrate.

== Impact on the aftermath ==
Almost immediately after the fire destroyed the Mt. Carmel compound, Thibodeau was active in voicing his perspective on the siege. In 1995, congressional hearings were held that turned partisan over the issue of the Republican-led investigation's association with the National Rifle Association of America. Thibodeau, who in The New York Times was described as a Republican witness, argued that the ATF could have served Koresh's arrest warrant without the use of a raid since Koresh regularly jogged outside the compound.

Thibodeau was held as a material witness against other Davidians charged with various crimes in relation to the Waco siege.

== Life after 1993 ==
He (re-)married in 1997 and has at least one daughter.

In 1999, he co-authored a memoir called A Place Called Waco: A Survivor's Story with Leon Whiteson, a Zimbabwe-born novelist, critic, and architect. Thibodeau runs a website called "Waco Survivors," in which he archives media related to the Waco siege.

In 2018, the miniseries Waco aired featuring Rory Culkin playing David Thibodeau and Thibodeau himself in a cameo role as an unnamed character.

Thibodeau is a drummer for the band The Blast Addicts, and he resided in Texas as of 2020. He played drums for other bands after the Waco siege as well, including Grooviest Maximus.

In 2023, the television miniseries Waco: American Apocalypse was released, in which Thibodeau was interviewed for his perspective and stance on the ATF involvement from the viewpoint of the survivors within Mt. Carmel.
