= Hans Christopher =

American/Swedish actor

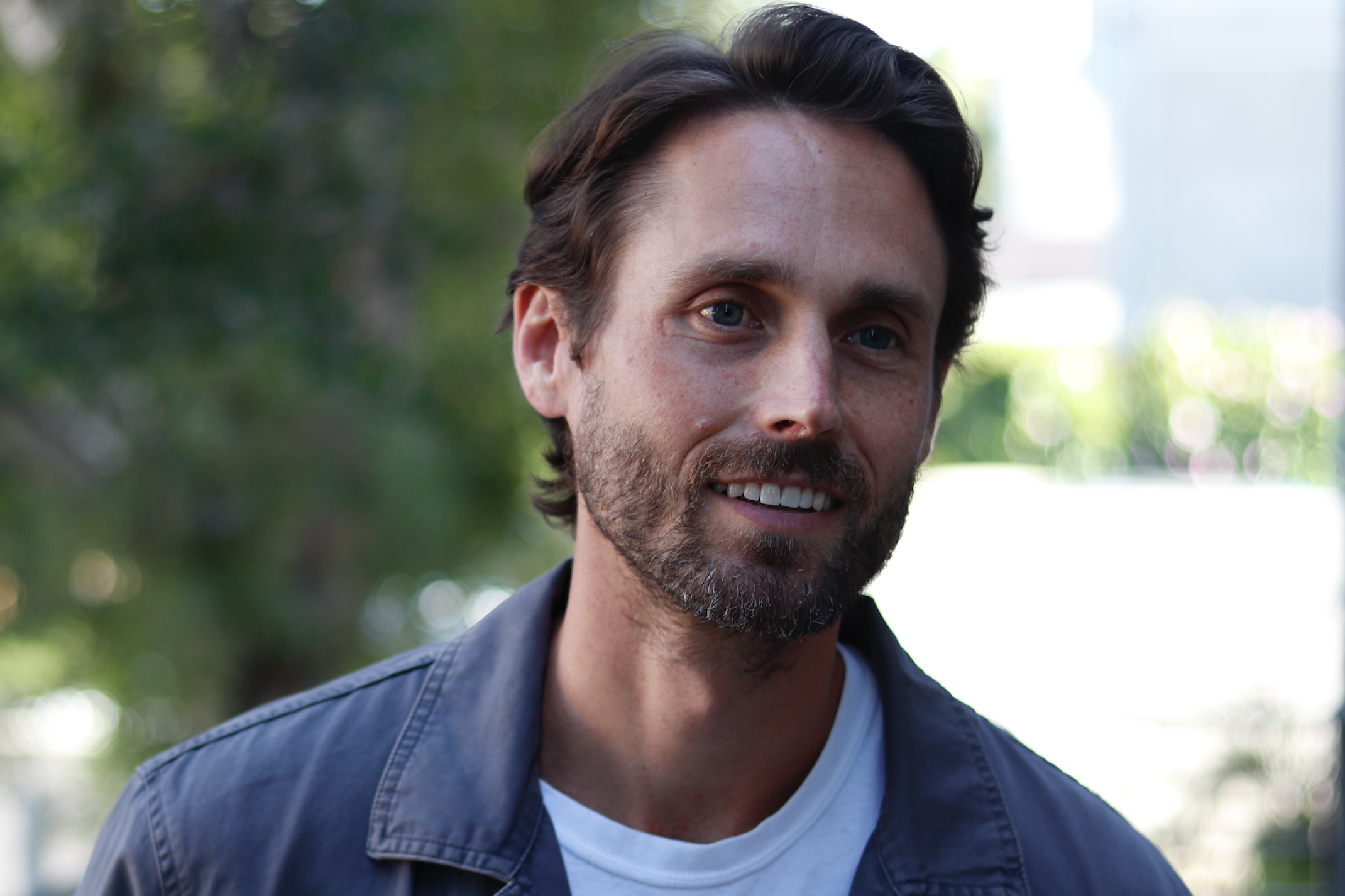
- Hans Christopher at Sundance 2019
- Born: Hans Christopher Brofeldt; 21 February 1982 (age 44); Sacramento, California
- Occupation: Actor
- Years active: 2008–present

Hans Christopher Brofeldt (born 21 February 1982) is an American actor, poet, and activist, currently residing in Venice, Los Angeles. Hans is known for numerous film and television roles, including John Baker in the movie Dreamland (2019); Randy Weaver (his film debut) in Paramount's six-part mini-series Waco (2018); for his role of Nicholls in AMC's The Walking Dead (2021); and as John Brown in Reeling (2025), executive produced by Werner Herzog, which world premiered at the SXSW Film Festival.

== Early life ==
The son of a Swedish doctor and an American flight attendant, Hans was born February 21, 1982, in Northern California but spent the first year of his life in Playa Del Rey, Los Angeles before moving to Sacramento, where he was raised. After graduating high school he attended Cal State Long Beach studying pre-med before deciding upon a career in acting.

== Career ==
Hans began his acting career doing print and commercial work while also studying acting in Los Angeles. His first film role was in a 2012 short film called The Take. Between 2012 and 2017 he appeared in a more than a dozen more short films, including Far Between, Light of Night, and Lockdown.

In 2017 he made his first television appearance guest starring as Randy Weaver in Paramount's Waco miniseries starring Michael Shannon and Taylor Kitsch. His first major film role was in Dreamland (2019), which debuted at the Tribeca Film Festival featuring Margot Robbie and Travis Fimmel, where he played alcoholic patriarch John Baker. In 2019 he also appeared in Progeny and the upcoming The Purple Iris (directed by Arif Khan). He's also appeared in Lifetime's Model Citizen, renamed A Deadly Price for Her Pretty Face, as the monstrously abusive Nick Archer, NBC's Midnight, Texas; and Hulu's Light as a Feather. Recently Hans was seen in a 6-episode arc playing the role of Auge in the final season of TNTʼs drama series Animal Kingdom. Additionally, Hans is starring in the interactive feature, Immortality, from BAFTA award-winning director Sam Barlow, which debuted at Tribeca Film Festival and was released in August.

He appeared in the romantic heist comedy Marmalade (2024) as Officer Cambio, starring Joe Keery and Aldis Hodge, and in A24ʼ's The Curse (2023), created by Nathan Fielder and Benny Safdie, starring Emma Stone. He also appeared in Showtimeʼs American Gigolo (2022) starring Jon Bernthal, and Fox's 9-1-1 (2022). In 2024, he guest starred in CBS's FBI: Most Wanted and in 2026 in ABC's The Rookie. His most prominent role to date is John Brown in Reeling (2025), a drama directed by Yana Alliata and executive produced by Werner Herzog, which world premiered as one of eight narrative competition selections at the 2025 South by Southwest Film Festival. He also appears opposite Joe Cole and Marshawn Lynch in the action crime-thriller He Bled Neon (2026).

== Filmography ==
=== Film ===
Year	Title	Role	Notes
2021	Lotus Land	The Cowboy	Short Film
2020	Dreamland	John Baker	Feature film
2019	Model Citizen (A Deadly Price for her Pretty Face)	Nick Archer	Feature film
2019	Progeny	Mr. Walton	Short film
2019	Float	Mr. Wilder	Short film
2019	Purple Iris	Ryker	Short film
2026	He Bled Neon		Feature film
2025	Reeling	John Brown	Feature film; SXSW 2025 world premiere
2025	The Daughter	Thomas	Short film
2024	Marmalade	Officer Cambio	Feature film
2018	Currents	Terrence	Short film
2018	The Stork	Daniel	Short film

=== Television ===
Year	Title	Role	Notes
2026	The Rookie	Isak	
2024	FBI: Most Wanted	Aaron Quallich	
2023	The Curse	David Burn	
2022	American Gigolo	Andrew	
2022	9-1-1	Kurt Engler	
2022	Animal Kingdom	Auge	Episode 6.2, 6.3, 6.4, 6.5, 6.6, 6.7
2021	The Walking Dead	Nicholls	Episode 11.3
2020	Light as a Feather	Officer Steph Tayne	Episode 2.13
2018	Midnight, Texas	Bruce Baker	Episode: "The Monster of the Week Is Patriarchy"
2018	Waco	Randy Weaver	Episode: "Visions and Omens"

=== Video games ===
Year	Title	Role	Notes
2022	Immortality	John Durick	
