= Steve Schneider (Branch Davidian) =

American Branch Davidian (1949–1993)

Steven Emil Schneider (October 16, 1949 – April 19, 1993) was an American Branch Davidian commonly called a "lieutenant" to David Koresh, the leader of the new religious movement. He was formally married to Judy Schneider, but in the community Koresh impregnated Judy and she bore a child with him. Steve Schneider was raised in a Seventh-day Adventist household in Wisconsin. Schneider studied at Newbold College in the United Kingdom, and eventually worked to receive a Ph.D. in comparative religion at the University of Hawaiʻi. In approximately 1986, Schneider encountered Marc Breault, an indigenous Hawaiian Branch Davidian, and converted to Branch Davidianism.

Schneider was supposedly very successful at gaining converts to Branch Davidianism. David Thibodeau, a survivor of the Waco siege and memoirist, converted after meeting Schneider in California. Scholars James Tabor and Eugene Gallagher note that he claimed to have converted twenty people on a trip to England in 1988. Schneider was in the Mount Carmel compound at the beginning of the Waco siege on February 28, 1993. He stayed in or near the compound for the entire siege and died there. Various police agencies believe that Schneider shot Koresh before shooting himself on April 19, 1993. He was a major character in the 2018 miniseries Waco, played by Paul Sparks.

== Life before Branch Davidianism and conversion ==
Schneider grew up in a Seventh-day Adventist household in Madison, Wisconsin. His parents are Emil and Patricia Schneider, who lived in Oneida County, Wisconsin at the end of the Waco siege in 1993.

He attended Newbold College in England before being expelled for drunkenness. He applied for and was accepted to a Ph.D. program in comparative religion at University of Hawaiʻi in approximately 1981.

Schneider met Judy in about 1971 and married her in July 1981. In 1978, Steve and Judy moved to Hawaii so he could begin his Ph.D. program.

In 1986, Judy and Steve encountered Marc Breault in Hawaii. Steve was unable to find a job while working on his Ph.D. – he supposedly wanted to evangelize but found no church he felt worthy of his services until meeting a Branch Davidian. The exact date of his conversion is unknown, but Tabor and Gallagher note that a videotape of a South Carolina Bible study from 1987 features Schneider, implying he converted in about 1986. Steve excitedly wanted to join the Branch Davidians, but Judy was reluctant. However, in 1986, Steve and Judy joined the Branch Davidians, and Judy maintained contact with her mother via telephone.

== Waco siege and death ==
Schneider was very active in the Branch Davidian community before and during the siege of the Mount Carmel Center. As David Koresh's "right-hand man," "lieutenant," or "deputy," Schneider held a significant amount of organizational power among the Davidians.

Schneider was the main person with whom the Federal Bureau of Investigation (FBI) negotiated. One scholar called him Koresh's main "spokesperson." According to Robert R. Agnes, Schneider spoke to the FBI approximately 50% of the time, where Koresh spoke 40% of the time. Some of the details of the "negotiations" were religious and spiritual in nature; Schneider once read the entirety of Revelation 18 to a negotiator.

At approximately 5:55 AM CDT (UTC–5:00), the FBI Hostage Rescue Team called the Branch Davidians to inform them the FBI will administer CS gas in the compound to expel the Branch Davidians. Steve Schneider answered, spoke with the FBI agents on the other end, reportedly slammed the telephone on the receiver, and pulled the phone from the wall.

After a fire started at about 12:00 PM CDT, Schneider remained in the compound with about 75 other Branch Davidians and died. FBI Agent Bob Ricks believes that Schneider shot and killed Koresh before the fire killed them because Schneider realized he was a "fraud," and he soon afterward shot himself. A preliminary autopsy of his body confirmed that he had died of a head injury likely caused by "a blast or a gunshot wound."

== See also ==
- Branch Davidians
- David Koresh
- Waco (miniseries)
- Waco siege
