= Livingstone Fagan =

British Branch Davidian (born 1959)

Livingstone Fagan (born 15 May 1959) – sometimes misspelled as Livingston Fagan – is a British Branch Davidian who survived the Waco siege in 1993. He was born in Jamaica, but moved to Nottingham in 1964 with his parents as part of the Windrush generation. He joined the Branch Davidians in 1989 while studying to join the Seventh-day Adventist ministry in the United Kingdom. He moved to Mount Carmel Center with his wife, Evette (sometimes spelled Yvette), and mother, Doris Adina, both of whom would die in the 19 April 1993 fire. He left the Mount Carmel Center before the 19 April fire. He was tried and convicted in the United States of voluntary manslaughter and using a firearm during a crime. He was given a 30-year prison sentence and spent about half of it in various holding facilities in the United States. He was released in July 2007 and deported to the United Kingdom where he currently lives.

== Early life and education ==
Livingstone Fagan was born in Jamaica on 15 May 1959. He moved to Nottingham, United Kingdom, with his parents in 1964. His father, Fitzroy, was employed as a steelworker.

He studied for a Bachelor of Science at Manchester University in environmental science. He met his wife, Evette, at Manchester University. During this time, he was employed as a social worker. Evette and Livingstone Fagan had two children together – Renae and Neharah Fagan.

He sought to join the Seventh-day Adventist ministry after his undergraduate education and transferred to Newbold College where he met David Koresh, the leader of the Branch Davidians, in 1988. He completed his coursework to become a Seventh-day Adventist pastor in December 1988. According to Spectrum magazine, Fagan was recruited to spread Branch Davidianism in Nottingham through Steve Schneider, another Branch Davidian and theologian.

In 1989, Fagan graduated from Newbold and was interning in a Leicester church. His license to work in the Seventh-day Adventist church was revoked after the North England Conference of Seventh-day Adventists heard he was proselytizing for David Koresh.

== Joining the Branch Davidians and the Waco siege ==
According to an interview with The Sunday Times, Livingstone Fagan only spoke with David Koresh for a few hours before converting. In 1992, he decided to move to the Mount Carmel Center. He brought his wife, mother, his two children, and his sister with him. Evette would become "married" to Koresh upon arriving to Mount Carmel.

Fagan was present at the Mount Carmel Center on 28 February 1993 when the Bureau of Alcohol, Tobacco, and Firearms (ATF) attempted a raid resulting in a shootout. One ATF agent claims he saw Fagan shooting through a window during the shootout.

At least once during the 51-day siege, the Federal Bureau of Investigation (FBI) negotiators discussed theology with Fagan over the telephone.

Fagan left the compound with his two children, Renae and Neharah, on 23 March 1993. Reportedly, Koresh sent out Fagan in an effort for Fagan to become a spokesperson for the Branch Davidians theologically outside of the Mount Carmel Center. According to an early report from the United States Department of Justice, soon after Fagan's release, Steve Schneider demanded a call between them but Fagan refused to call. In a written deposition, Fagan admitted that he fired at ATF agents on 28 February 1993.

== Life after the Waco siege ==
Immediately after leaving the Mount Carmel Center on 23 March 1993, he was held in McLennan County jail as a material witness. However, soon after he had charges against him from the 28 February 1993 botched raid by the ATF. One ATF agent, Eric Evers, reportedly identified Fagan out a suspect lineup as someone who shot at ATF agents on 28 February 1993. However, a Texas Ranger in January 1994 gave Fagan's attorney evidence – the photograph of Fagan used in the lineup which had a note on its back saying Evers was unsure if Fagan was the culprit – to doubt Evers's testimony. Another federal agent also identified Fagan as a shooter. One former Branch Davidian, Victorine Hollingsworth, testified that she overheard Fagan telling Koresh that he shot an ATF agent, saying that Fagan said he "got him in the stomach". In a wrongful death lawsuit in 2000, Fagan wrote in a deposition that he shot at two of the four ATF agents who climbed the roof of the Mount Carmel Center.

According to United Press International, in an address to Judge Walter S. Smith, who brought down the sentences onto Fagan and other Branch Davidians, Fagan said that he still admired David Koresh, that "from the beginning we [the Branch Davidians] never figured we would receive justice", and that the Branch Davidians were "inocent [sic], absolutely, without any doubt". Reportedly, Judge Smith called Fagan a "crazy, murdering son of a bitch" – because of this comment and others, the Branch Davidians' attorneys believed Smith should have recused himself, but Department of Justice lawyer Marie Hagen argued that his comments did not show prejudice against the Davidians.

According to The New York Times, Fagan was originally sentenced to 40 years in prison – 10 for the voluntary manslaughter conviction and 30 for the weapons charge. Although Fagan did not appeal his conviction, Judge Smith reduced the sentence to 30 years in September 2000. He was also fined US$5,000. According to an interview with The Sunday Times, he spent only about half of the 30-year sentence in the United States before being deported to Britain in July 2007. He spent time in facilities in McLennan County, Texas; El Reno, Oklahoma; Oklahoma City, Oklahoma; Oxford, Wisconsin; Leavenworth, Kansas; Marion, Illinois; Pennsylvania; and Virginia in an informal punishment process called "diesel therapy".

According to Fagan's interview with The Sunday Times, in Virginia he was forced to provide a blood sample to be entered into a DNA database. In Leavenworth, he recalled an instance where prison guards hosed down him and his cell and turned on an industrial fan outside it (making the cell extremely cold). He was frequently beaten by officers in Leavenworth and other facilities.

He was released from prison in Marion, Illinois. He was deported to Heathrow Airport by two deportation officers in July 2007.

After 1994, Fagan wrote and published various works of Branch Davidian theology, while incarcerated in the United States and living in Britain. Most of the works are unpublished manuscripts or published through Grosvenor House Publishing Ltd. His works include Mt. Carmel: The Unseen Reality (1994), The Gift of Immortality (2013), A Door Opened in Heaven: Understanding the Revelation (2014), and Understanding Waco & Salvation (2017). He also contributed a chapter to the book Prophecy in the New Millennium: When Prophecies Persist (2013), edited by Sarah Harvey and Suzanne Newcombe.
