= Branch Davidians =

American religious sect

- Flag of the Branch Davidians

Founder
- Benjamin Roden

Regions with significant populations
- Texas (United States)

Branch Davidian
- Mount Carmel: Elk, Texas, U.S.

Languages
- English

The Branch Davidians (or the General Association of Branch Davidian Seventh-day Adventists, or the Branch Seventh-day Adventists) are a religious sect founded in 1955 by Benjamin Roden. They regard themselves as a continuation of the General Association of Davidian Seventh-Day Adventists, established by Victor Houteff in 1935.

Houteff, a Seventh-day Adventist, wrote a series of tracts entitled the "Shepherd's Rod" that called for reform of the Seventh-day Adventist Church. After his ideas were rejected, Houteff and his followers formed the group that became known as "Davidians," and some moved onto land outside Waco, Texas. They built a community called the Mount Carmel Center, which served as headquarters for the movement. After Houteff's death in 1955, his wife Florence took control of the organization. That same year, Benjamin Roden, a follower of Houteff, proclaimed what he believed to be a new message from God and wrote letters presenting it to Davidians.

In 1957, Florence sold the Mount Carmel Center and purchased 941 acres (381 ha) near Elk, Texas – 13 miles (21 km) northeast of Waco – naming it New Mount Carmel Center. After the failure of Florence's prophecy of apocalyptic events on or near April 22, 1959, she dissolved the Davidian Association in 1962 and sold all but 77.86 acres (31.51 ha) of the New Mount Carmel property. Benjamin Roden took possession of it in 1962 and began efforts to purchase the remaining 77.86 acres (31.51 ha). On February 27, 1973, New Mount Carmel was sold to Benjamin, his wife Lois Roden, and their son George Roden. From then on, the property was simply known as Mount Carmel. Upon the death of Benjamin Roden in 1978, Lois became the next Davidian prophet at the compound.

In 1981, a young man named Vernon Howell, later known as David Koresh, came to Mount Carmel and studied biblical prophecy under Lois Roden. By 1983, Howell (Koresh) had gained a group of followers that separated from Lois' organization to form "The Davidian Branch Davidian Seventh Day Adventist Association". Meanwhile, Lois continued to operate the Branch Davidian Seventh Day Adventist Association from Mt. Carmel Center near Waco. Koresh's group and the Branch Davidians (Lois's group) were two separate organizations with different leaders, names, and locations from 1983. It was not until 1987, after Lois died, that Koresh filed a document claiming to be the president of the Branch Davidian Seventh Day Adventist Association. Koresh and followers went to Mt. Carmel center, engaging in a shootout with George Roden that eventually resulted in Koresh's group occupying the land. These actions are regarded by Branch Davidians who remained loyal to Lois Roden as an act of identity theft against them.

Koresh's leadership ended at the Waco siege of 1993, a fifty-one–day standoff between the sect and federal agents. Four agents of the U.S. Bureau of Alcohol, Tobacco, and Firearms (ATF) and two residents were killed by the sect during the initial raid, while four sect members were killed by ATF agents on February 28, 1993. Seventy-five members of Koresh's group, including many children, died in a fire that erupted during the siege on April 19, 1993.

== Early history ==
In 1929, Victor Houteff, a Bulgarian immigrant and a Seventh-day Adventist Sabbath School teacher from southern California, claimed that he had a new message for the entire Adventist church. He presented his views in a book, The Shepherd's Rod: The 144,000 – A Call for Reformation. The Adventist leadership rejected Houteff's views as contrary to the church's basic teachings, and local church congregations disfellowshipped Houteff and his followers.

In 1934, Houteff established his headquarters to the west of Waco, Texas, and his group became known as the Davidians. In 1942, he renamed the group the General Association of Davidian Seventh-day Adventists – 'Davidian' which indicated its belief in the restoration of the Davidic Kingdom of Israel. Following Houteff's death in 1955, his wife Florence usurped the leadership believing herself to be a prophet. Convinced that an apocalypse would occur in 1959, a date which is not found in her husband's original writings, Florence and her council gathered hundreds of their faithful followers at the Mount Carmel Center, the group's compound which was located near Waco, for the fulfillment of the prophecy which is written in Ezekiel 9.

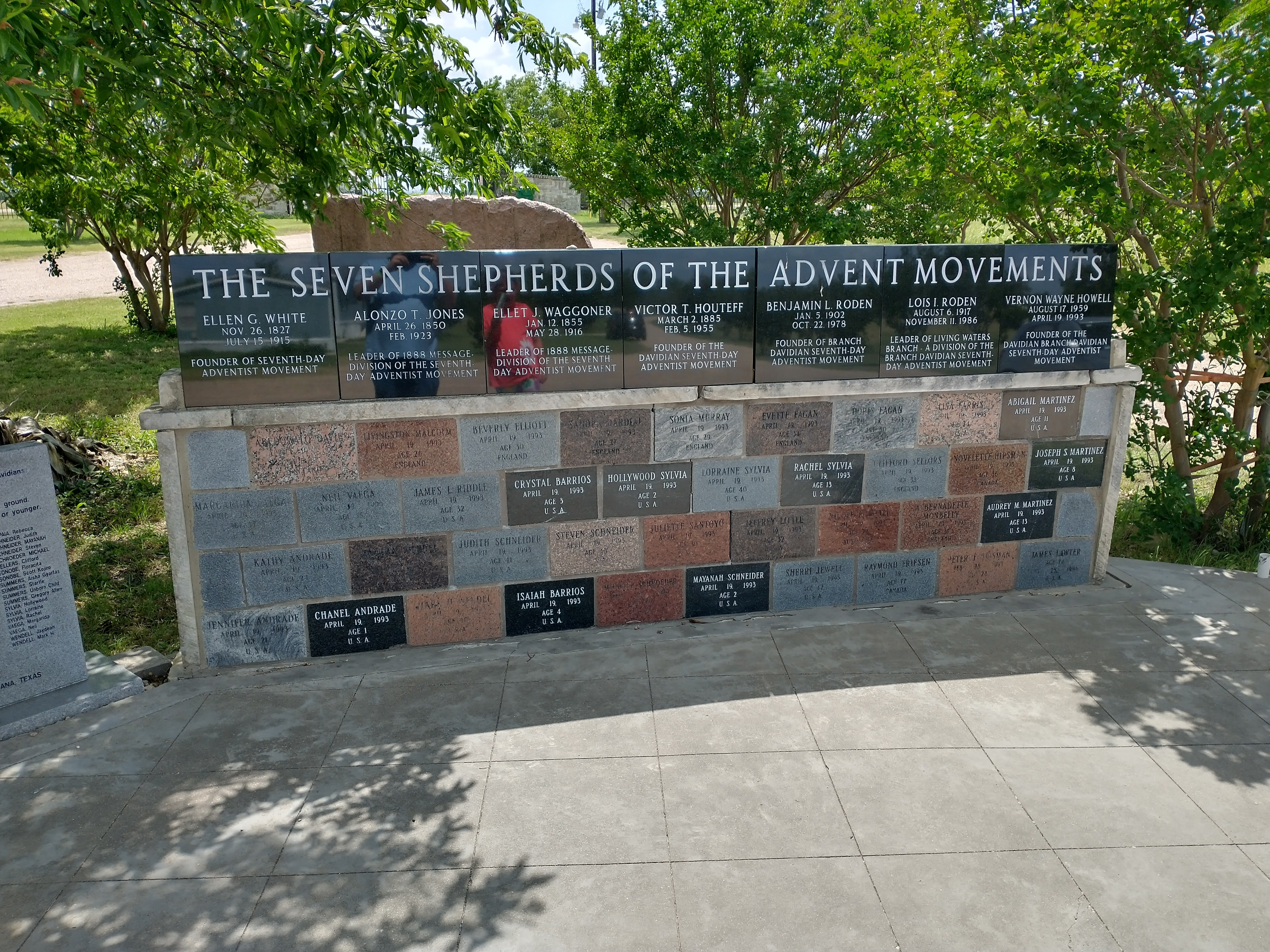
A memorial at the Mount Carmel site identifying leaders of the Adventist movement from Ellen G. White to Vernon Howell

The anticipated events did not occur, and following this disappointment, Benjamin Roden formed another group which he called the Branch Davidians and succeeded in taking control of Mount Carmel. The name of this group is an allusion to the anointed 'Branch' (mentioned in Zechariah 3:8; 6:12). When Benjamin Roden died in 1978, he was succeeded by his wife Lois Roden. Members of the Branch Davidians were torn between allegiance to Ben's wife or to his son, George. After Lois died, George assumed the right to the Presidency. However, less than a year later, Vernon Howell rose to power and became the leader over those in the group who sympathized with him.

== Rise of David Koresh ==
Howell's arrival at Mount Carmel in 1981 was well received by nearly everyone at the Davidian commune. He had engaged in an affair with Lois Roden while he was in his early 20s and she was in her late 60s. Howell wanted to father a child with her, who, according to his understanding, would be the Chosen One. When she died, George Roden inherited the positions of prophet and leader of the sect. A power struggle ensued between Roden and Howell, who soon gained the loyalty of the majority of the Davidians. In 1984, Howell and his followers left Mount Carmel after Roden accused Howell of having started a fire that consumed a $500,000 administration building and press, which Roden subsequently renamed "Rodenville". Another splinter group, led by Charlie Pace, left and settled in Alabama.

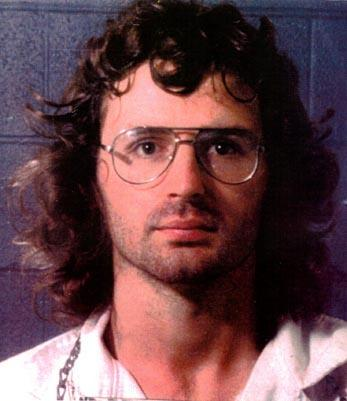
David Koresh in a 1987 mug shot

As an attempt to regain support, Roden challenged Howell to raise the dead, going so far as to exhume the corpse of a two-decades–deceased Davidian in order to demonstrate his spiritual supremacy. (Roden denied this, saying he had only been moving the community cemetery.) This illegal act gave Howell an opportunity to attempt to file charges against Roden, but he was told that he needed evidence in order to substantiate the charges. On November 3, 1987, Howell and seven of his followers raided Mount Carmel, equipped with five .223-caliber semi-automatic rifles, two .22-caliber rifles, two 12-gauge shotguns, and nearly four hundred rounds of ammunition, in an apparent attempt to retake the compound. Although Howell's group claimed that it was trying to obtain evidence of Roden's illegal activities, its members did not take a camera with them.

The trial ended with the jury finding Howell's followers not guilty, but the jury members were unable to agree on a verdict for Howell himself. After his followers were acquitted, Howell invited the prosecutors to Mount Carmel for ice cream.

It is claimed that Howell was never authorized to name his breakaway sect the "Branch Davidians", and the church which bears that name continues to represent the members of the Branch church who did not follow him.

=== As a spiritual leader ===
Howell, who acquired the position of spiritual leader from Roden, asserted it by changing his name to David Koresh, suggesting that he had ties to the biblical King David and Cyrus the Great (Koresh is the Hebrew version of the name Cyrus). He wanted to create a new lineage of world leaders. This practice later served as the basis for allegations that Koresh was committing child abuse, which contributed to the siege by the ATF.

Interpreting Revelation 5:2, Koresh identified himself with the Lamb mentioned therein. This is traditionally believed to symbolize Jesus Christ; however, Koresh suggested that the Lamb would come before Jesus and pave the way for his Second Coming.

By the time of the 1993 Waco siege, Koresh had encouraged his followers to think of themselves as "students of the Seven Seals," rather than as "Branch Davidians." During the standoff, one of his followers publicly announced that he wanted them to thereafter be identified by the name "Koreshians".

== Federal siege ==
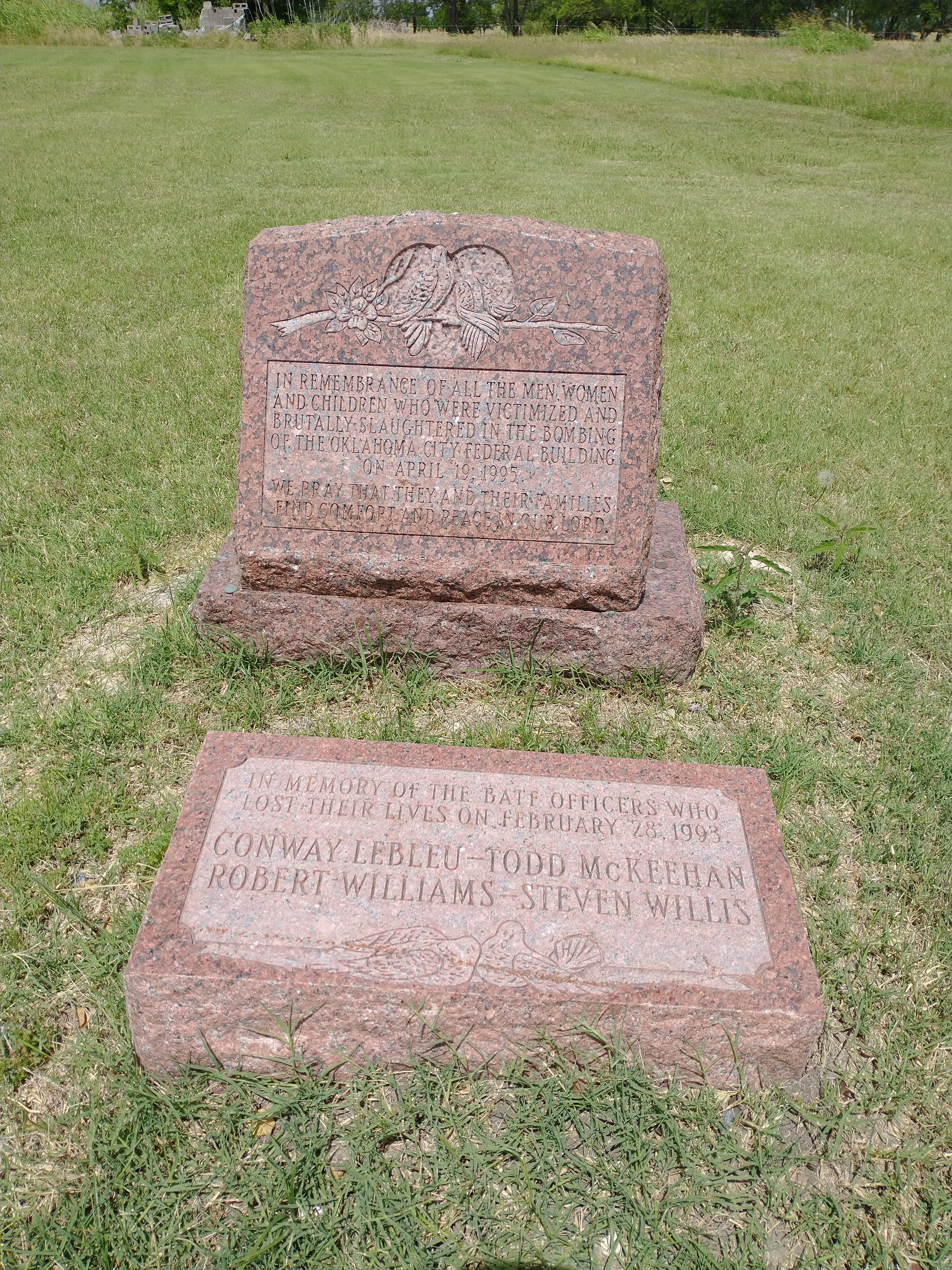
A memorial to the four ATF agents killed in the February 28 raid on the Mount Carmel Center

On February 28, 1993, at 4:20 am, the Bureau of Alcohol, Tobacco, and Firearms attempted to execute a search warrant relating to alleged sexual abuse charges and illegal weapons violations. The ATF attempted to breach the compound for approximately two hours until their ammunition ran low. Four ATF agents (Steve Willis, Robert Williams, Todd McKeehan, and Conway Charles LeBleu) were killed and another sixteen agents were wounded during the raid. The five Branch Davidians killed in the 9:45 a.m. raid were Winston Blake (British), Peter Gent (Australian), Peter Hipsman, Perry Jones, and Jaydean Wendell; two were killed by the Branch Davidians. Almost six hours after the ceasefire, Michael Schroeder was shot dead by ATF agents who alleged he fired a pistol at agents as he attempted to re-enter the compound with Woodrow Kendrick and Norman Allison. His wife said he was merely returning from work and had not participated in the day's earlier altercation.

After the raid, ATF agents established contact with Koresh and others inside of the compound. The FBI took command after the deaths of federal agents, and managed to facilitate the release of nineteen children (without their parents) relatively early into the negotiations. The children were then interviewed by the FBI and the Texas Rangers.

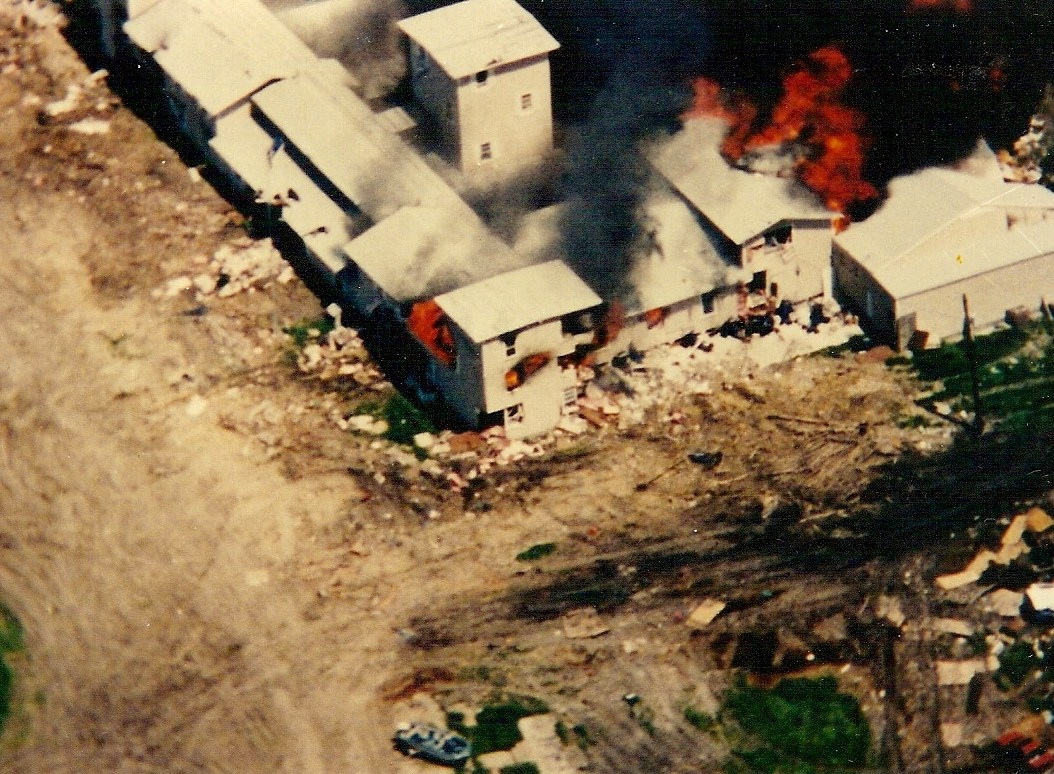
FBI photo of the Mount Carmel Center engulfed in flames

On April 19, 1993, the FBI moved for a final siege of the compound using large weaponry such as .50 caliber (12.7 mm) rifles and armored combat engineering vehicles (CEV) to combat the heavily armed Branch Davidians. The FBI attempted to use tear gas to flush out the Branch Davidians. Officially, FBI agents were only permitted to return any incoming fire, not to actively assault the Branch Davidians. When several Branch Davidians opened fire, the FBI's response was to increase the amount of gas being used. Around noon, three fires broke out simultaneously in different parts of the building. The government maintains that the fires were deliberately started by Branch Davidians. Some Branch Davidian survivors maintain that the fires were started either accidentally or deliberately by the assault. Of the eighty-five Branch Davidians in the compound when the final siege began, seventy-six died on April 19 in various ways, from falling rubble to suffocating effects of the fire, or by gunshot from fellow Branch Davidians. The siege had lasted fifty-one days.

=== Aftermath ===
Four ATF agents were killed, sixteen were wounded, and six Branch Davidians died in the initial raid on February 28. Seventy-six more died in the final assault on April 19, including children. The events at Waco spurred criminal prosecution and civil litigation. A federal grand jury indicted twelve of the surviving Branch Davidians — including Clive Doyle, Brad Branch, Ruth Riddle, and Livingstone Fagan — charging them with aiding and abetting in the murder of federal officers, and unlawful possession and use of various firearms. Eight Branch Davidians were convicted on firearms charges, five convicted of voluntary manslaughter, and four were acquitted of all charges. As of July 2007, all Branch Davidians had been released from prison.

Civil suits were brought against the United States government, federal officials, former governor of Texas Ann Richards, and members of the Texas Army National Guard. The bulk of these claims were dismissed because they were insufficient as a matter of law or because the plaintiffs could advance no material evidence in support of them. One case, Andrade v. Chojnacki, made it to the Fifth Circuit, which upheld a previous ruling of "take-nothing, denied".

== After the siege ==
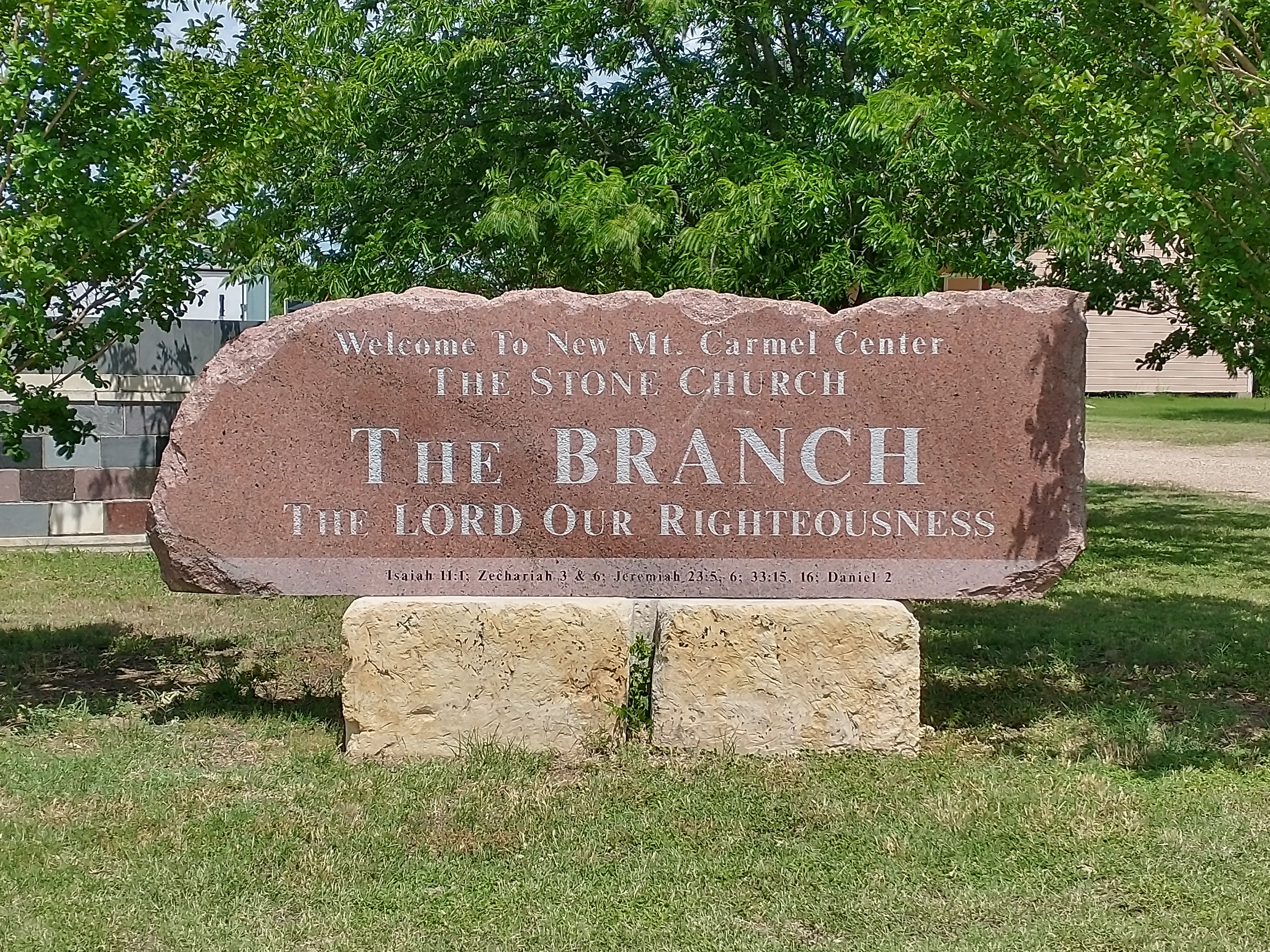
A sign at the Mt Carmel Center identifying the denomination

There are several groups that claim descent from the Branch Davidians today. The group that retains the original name "Branch Davidian Seventh Day Adventist" regards Lois Roden's immediate successor to have been Doug Mitchell (who joined the Branch Davidians in 1978 and led the group from 1986 until his death in 2013) and Mitchell's successor to be Trent Wilde (who has led the group since 2013). This group never followed David Koresh.

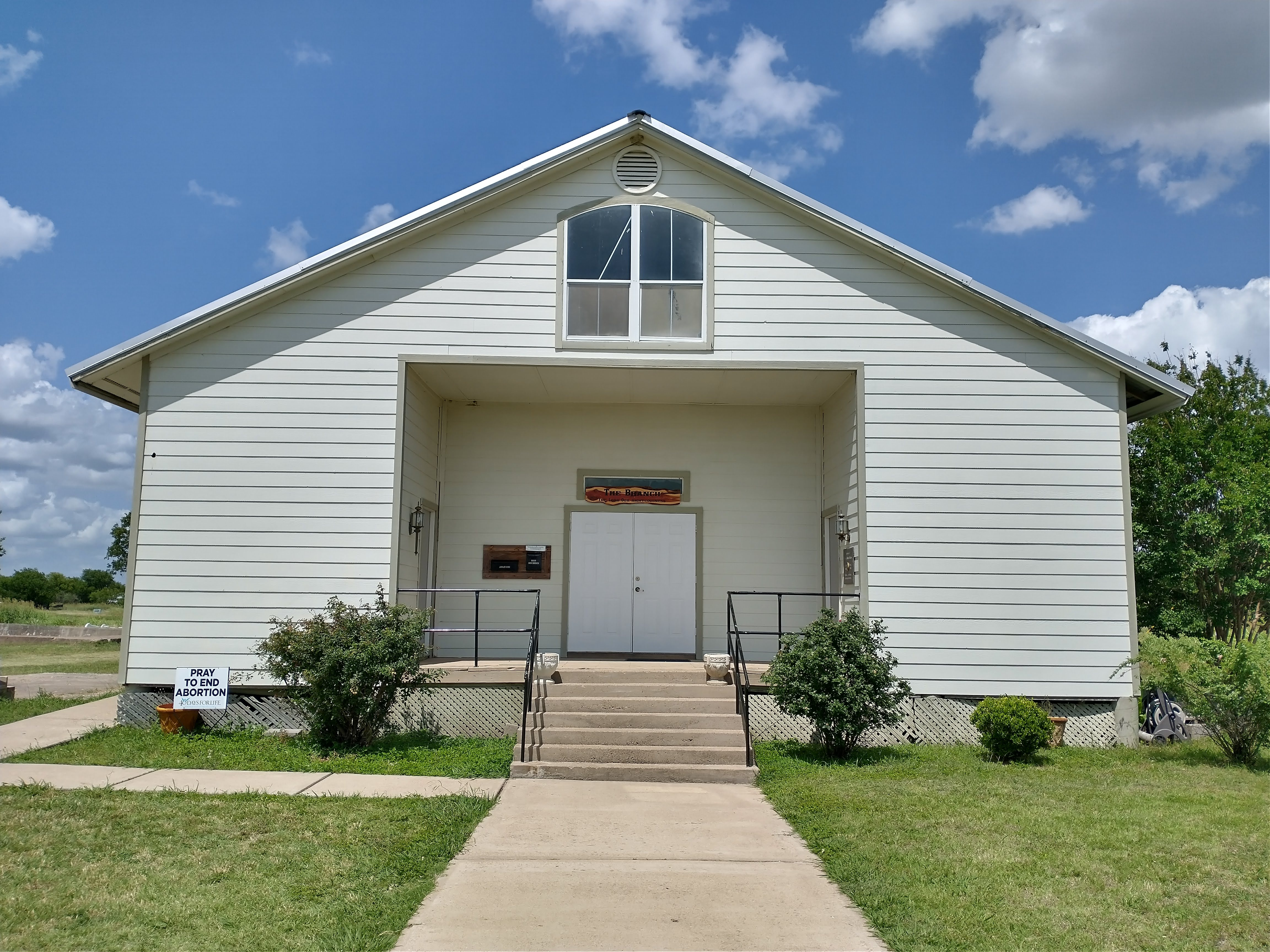
A Branch Davidian church at the Mount Carmel Center site

Another group exists under the leadership of Charles Pace, called The Branch, The Lord Our Righteousness. It is a legally recognized denomination with twelve members. Pace, while regarding Koresh as appointed by God, says that Koresh "twisted the Bible's teachings by fathering more than a dozen children with members' wives". Pace believes that the Lord "has anointed me and appointed me to be the leader", but he says he is "not a prophet" but "a teacher of righteousness". Others, once led by Clive Doyle, continue to believe Koresh was a prophet and await his resurrection, along with the followers who were killed. Both of these groups are still waiting for the end times. Doyle died in June 2022.

== Flag ==
The original Davidian flag, as described in the Catalog-Syllabus (1942), showed a red lion inside a black six-pointed star, surrounded by five-pointed stars, on a green field.

On February 28, 1993, the day of their initial confrontation with the ATF, a similar flag made of fringed satin was visible hanging in a front window of the compound. This flag had a pink six-pointed star surrounded by five-pointed stars, on a gold field. It had been presented to Benjamin Roden by northern Branch Davidians, but Roden never flew it because "the colors were wrong". Koresh, however, decided to hang it, and although it was destroyed on the first day it continued to hang in tatters throughout the siege.

Reconstruction of the second Waco flag by Matthew D. Wittmer.

The Waco sect hoisted a different flag on their flagpole on March 1, 1993, after being surrounded by federal agents. This flag was also made of satin and was sewn in part by Kathy Jones. Steve Schneider described it as containing a "stylistic Star of David" and the fiery flying serpent mentioned in Isaiah 14. According to Koresh, the flag signified Mount Carmel's status as a sovereign power. This flag ripped off its pole during the Mount Carmel compound fire, and the ATF replaced it with an American flag, a Texas flag, and their own flag.

Carol Howe reported that a Branch Davidian flag was hanging in Elohim City as of January 1995, before the Oklahoma City bombing.

== Relationship with Seventh-Day Adventists ==
The Seventh-day Adventist Church, the main church in the Adventist tradition, rejected Victor Houteff's teachings and revoked his membership in 1930.

Houteff then went on to found the Davidian Seventh Day Adventist Association (an offshoot which is also known as the Shepherd's Rod). The Branch Davidians are an offshoot of the Davidians and they are also a product of a schism which was initiated by Benjamin Roden, after Houteff's death and in light of Florence's (Houteff's wife) usurpation of power.

Florence believed that she was a prophet. But her prediction of the demise of the Seventh Day Adventist Church, which according to her should have occurred forty-two months after Houteff's death (1959) failed to materialize. Likewise, Ben Roden believed that he was a prophet as well as a rightful heir to the leadership of the Davidians.

While they were still formally members of the Seventh-day Adventist Church, the Branch Davidian leaders demanded a reform of the church and when their demand was met with opposition (by both the Seventh-day Adventists and the Davidians), they decided to leave that denomination and at the same time, they widely distanced themselves from the Davidians.

The Seventh-day Adventist Church deprived both the Branch Davidians and the Davidians of their membership in the denomination, in spite of this fact, the Branch Davidians actively continued to "hunt" members of the Seventh-day Adventist Church, and encourage them to leave it and join their group. The Seventh-day Adventists were reportedly "apprehensive" about the group's views because Branch Davidians claimed that they were the "only rightful continuation of the Adventist message", based on their belief that Victor Houteff was the divinely selected prophet and the successor of Ellen G. White. Both the Davidians and the Branch Davidians claimed that Houteff was their spiritual inspiration, as the founder of the Davidians. The Seventh-day Adventist Church issued warnings about the Branch Davidian sect's views to its members on a regular basis.

=== Schisms within the Branch Davidian sect ===
There is documented evidence (FBI negotiation transcripts, during the standoff, with Kathryn Shroeder and Steve Schneider with interjections from Koresh himself) that David Koresh and his followers did not call themselves Branch Davidians.

== See also ==
- Apocalypticism
- British Israelism
- Cult
- Judaizers
- List of ATF Controversies
- List of messiah claimants
- List of cults
- List of people claimed to be Jesus
- List of Seventh-day Adventists
- Millenarianism
- New religious movement
- Philo-Semitism
- Polygamy in North America
- Religious abuse
- Religious violence
- Spiritual abuse
