= List of Seventh-day Adventists =

This is a list of notable people who are members of the Seventh-day Adventist Church. In addition to living and deceased members, the list also includes notable former Seventh-day Adventists and those who were raised in the church, but did not become members.

== Academia ==
- Niels-Erik Andreasen – former president at Andrews University and Walla Walla College; also former teacher at Pacific Union College and former dean of Loma Linda University School of Religion
- Delbert Baker – President of Adventist University of Africa
- Sidney Brownsberger (1845–1930) – educator and first president of Healdsburg College (1882–1886)
- Gary Chartier – American legal scholar; philosopher and author who is Associate Dean and Professor of Law and Business ethics at La Sierra University
- Eva Beatrice Dykes (1893–1986) – taught at Dunbar High School; Walden University; Howard University, and was chair of the English department and the Division of Humanities at Oakwood University
- Larry Geraty – archaeologist; 7th president of Atlantic Union College (1985–1993), and 2nd president of La Sierra University (1993–2007)
- Lilia Wahinemaikaʻi Hale (1913-2003) - Kanaka Maoli educator, musician and author
- Michael G. Hasel - American biblical archaeologist who is the director of the Institute of Archaeology and curator of the Lynn H. Wood Archaeological Museum at Southern Adventist University
- Siegfried Horn (1908–1993) – German archaeologist; Bible scholar; author, and Professor of History of Antiquity and Dean of the Seventh-day Adventist Theological Seminary
- Milton E. Kern (1875–1961) – President of Foreign Mission Seminary (1910–1914); Dean of the Seventh-day Adventist Theological Seminary (1934–1943), and Chairperson of the Ellen G. White Estate (1944–1951)
- Heather Knight – 21st president of Pacific Union College (2009–2016)
- Dr. Norman Maphosa – Zimbabwean scholar, who is the former Vice Chancellor of Solusi University (1992–2011); former Zimsec board chairman and current Director General of Zimbabwe Institute of Public Management
- Malcolm Maxwell (1934–2007) – 19th president of Pacific Union College (1983–2001) and son of Arthur S. Maxwell
- Richard Osborn – 20th president of Pacific Union College (2001–2009); founder of the Association of Adventist Colleges and Universities; former principal of Takoma Academy; former Education director of Columbia Union Conference; former Vice-President for Education for the North American Division; former president of the Council for American Private Education; chairman of the Association of Independent California Colleges and Universities & Vice-President of the Western Association of Schools and Colleges
- Leslie Pollard - African-american who is the 11th president of Oakwood University
- W. W. Prescott (1855–1944) – President of Battle Creek College (1885–1894); founded Union College and became the first president in 1891; became president of Walla Walla College in 1891; founded Avondale School for Christian Workers; editor of the Review and Herald, and vice president of the General Conference of Seventh-day Adventists
- Denton E. Rebok (1897–1983) – taught at Washington Missionary College, La Sierra College; president of Southern Missionary College; Dean of the Seventh-day Adventist Theological Seminary; Chairperson of the Ellen G. White Estate (1952) and missionary to China
- Dr. Leona G. Running (1916–2014) – first female linguist and Bible scholar at Seventh-day Adventist Theological Seminary (1955–2002) and first female president of the Chicago Society of Biblical Research (1981–1982)
- Homer Russell Salisbury (1870–1915) – American professor, minister and missionary who founded Duncombe Hall College, taught at Claremont Union College; also former president of the South England Conference and Indian Union Mission. Killed when the SS Persia was sunk by a German submarine, during World War I.
- John Luis Shaw (1870–1952) – educator; missionary and treasurer

== Literature ==
- Anna L. Colcord (1864–1950) – American writer and editor
- Ray Garton – horror novelist raised Adventist; credits his interest in horror to a reaction to the beasts in Bible prophecy (see: Seventh-day Adventist eschatology)
- Hesba Fay Brinsmead (1922–2003) – children's author
- Nathan Brown – author and editor of Signs Publishing Company
- Candy Carson – African American author; philanthropist and wife of Ben Carson
- Diran Chrakian (1875–1921) – Armenian poet, writer, painter, teacher, and victim of the Armenian genocide
- Roswell F. Cottrell (1814–1892) – American writer; hymnist; poet; counselor, and preacher
- Clifford Goldstein – Jewish-American author and editor
- Arthur S. Maxwell (1896–1970) – known as Uncle Arthur, author of the Bedtime Stories series, and The Bible Story set of books, among 112 books
- Roger Morneau (1925–1998) – author on faith and prayer
- Christopher Mwashinga – author and poet, writes in English and Kiswahili
- Andrew Nelson (1893–1975) – missionary and linguist
- Cameron Slater – controversial blogger and editor of New Zealand Truth
- Annie R. Smith (1828–1855) – wrote 12 hymns and four poems
- Steven Spruill – novelist
- Standish brothers, Colin D. (1933–2018) and Russell R. (1933–2008) – identical twin authors

== Movies, television, and radio ==
- Terry Benedict - American film producer who created The Conscientious Objector and co-produced Hacksaw Ridge about Desmond Doss
- Grigoriy Dobrygin – Russian film and theatre actor; director, and producer
- DeVon Franklin – American producer, author and motivational speaker
- Antoinette Hertsenberg – Dutch actress and TV presenter, wife of Niko Koffeman, a politician who belongs to Party for the Animals
- Darwood Kaye (1929–2002) – former Our Gang actor who spent his adult life as a pastor
- Cesar Montano – multi-awarded Filipino actor, film producer/director; game show host & singer; Chief Operating Officer of the Tourism Promotions Board (2016-2018)
- Cid Moreira (1927-2024) – Brazilian journalist and TV presenter
- Nǃxau ǂToma (1944–2003) – starred as a Kalahari Bushman in the films The Gods Must Be Crazy, The Gods Must Be Crazy 2, Crazy Safari, Crazy in Hong Kong, and The Gods Must Be Funny in China; converted in later life
- Utica Queen – American drag queen and contestant on Rupaul's Drag Race

== Painters, illustrators and sculptors ==
- Harry Anderson (1906–1996) – American painter and illustrator whose clients were American Airlines, The American Magazine, Buster Brown Shoes, Coca-Cola, Collier's, Cosmopolitan, Cream of Wheat, Esso, Ford, Good Housekeeping, Humble Oil, John Hancock Mutual Life Insurance Company, Ladies' Home Journal, Massachusetts Mutual, Ovaltine, Redbook, Review and Herald Publishing Association, The Church of Jesus Christ of Latter-day Saints, The Saturday Evening Post, Woman's Home Companion, and Wyeth; won many award's and also was elected to the Illustrators Hall of Fame in 1994
- Luis Germán Cajiga – Puerto Rican painter, linocutter, and silk-screen printer
- Alan Collins (1928–2016) – American sculptor and art professor at Atlantic Union College (1968–1971), Andrews University (1971–1978) and La Sierra University (1978–1989)
- Greg Constantine – Canadian-American painter and illustrator and retired art professor at Andrews University
- Shirley Ardell Mason (1923–1998) – painter and art teacher who was known as Sybil and had Dissociative identity disorder

== Singers, songwriters, musicians, and conductors ==
- Rose May Alaba - Austrian singer, songwriter, recording artist and sister of David Alaba
- Herbert Blomstedt (1927-2026) – Swedish conductor and music director; Royal Stockholm Philharmonic Orchestra (1954), Norrköping Symphony Orchestra (1954–1962), Oslo Philharmonic (1962–1968), Danish National Symphony Orchestra (1967-1977), Staatskapelle Dresden (1975–1985), Swedish Radio Symphony Orchestra (1977-82), San Francisco Symphony (1985–1995), NDR Elbphilharmonie Orchestra (1996–1998), Leipzig Gewandhaus Orchestra (1998–2005) and the London Philharmonic Orchestra (2006-24)
- Charmaine Carrasco - American Christian pop musician
- Committed – winner of the second season of NBC's The Sing-Off
- Del Delker (1924–2018) – American contralto sacred music female vocalist who sang on the Voice of Prophecy
- Roy Drusky (1930-2004) - American Country music singer, songwriter producer, actor and disc jockey
- Manuel Escórcio – South African tenor who sang for the Cape Town City Opera
- Anna German (1936–1982) – famous Polish singer
- Heritage Singers – American gospel group founded by Max and Lucy Mace
- Wayne Hooper (1920–2007) – Musical Director for Voice of Prophecy radio program; composer; baritone
- The Isley Brothers – Grammy Award-winning American musical group consisting of brothers Ron and Ernie Isley
- Iyaz – R&B singer, rapper and songwriter; born Keidran Jones of the Virgin Islands; grew up in the church and still attends from time to time
- King's Heralds – American male gospel music quartet
- Little Richard (1932–2020) – former singer-songwriter and musician of Rock and roll
- Sunny Liu (1924–1987) – minister and singing evangelist
- Joe Lutcher (1919–2006) – American R&B saxophonist and bandleader who abandoned his musical career and witnessed to Little Richard
- Hugh Martin (1914–2011) – American theater and film composer; also accompanist for Del Delker
- NOTA – winner of the first season of NBC's The Sing-Off
- Kevin Olusola – cellist and beatboxer, member of Grammy Award-winning a cappella group Pentatonix, winners of third season of NBC's The Sing-Of
- Wintley Phipps – singer, songwriter, ordained pastor
- Tyler Rand - American arts executive
- Salt – American rapper & songwriter who was baptized into the Seventh-day Adventist Church on a mission trip in Ethiopia with Oakwood College.
- Take 6 – American a cappella gospel music sextet
- Rozonda Thomas – singer-songwriter; dancer; actress; television personality and model
- Sverre Valen (1925–2023) – Norwegian choir conductor
- Davido – Nigerian singer, songwriter and record producer; his father Adedeji Adeleke, Nigerian Billionaire, business magnate, founder and president of Adeleke University is a devout Seventh-Day Adventist

== Business ==
- E. G. Fulton (1867–1949) – Canadian-American businessperson and writer
- Will Keith Kellogg (1860–1951) – American industrialist who was the co-inventor of cornflakes with brother John Harvey Kellogg; philanthropist who founded the Fellowship Corporation, The Battle Creek Toasted Corn Flake Company, Child Welfare Foundation, W. K. Kellogg Arabian Horse Center, and Ann J. Kellogg School
- Almeda Lambert – American cookbook writer and businessperson
- Eric Rajah - Co-founder of A Better World
- Dale E. Twomley – American businessman, former president of Worthington Foods, educator and author

== Law ==
- James Alexander Chiles (1860–1930) – African American lawyer who argued at the Supreme Court against Chesapeake and Ohio Railway for desegregation of railroad coaches
- Daniel Nsereko – International Criminal Court judge

== Pioneers ==
- J. N. Andrews (1829–1883) – first Seventh-day Adventist missionary; minister; writer; editor of the Adventist Review and 3rd President of the General Conference of Seventh-day Adventists
- Joseph Bates (1792–1872) – seaman; founder of the Seventh-day Adventist Church; wrote a tract on the seventh-day Sabbath which convinced James and Ellen White to start observing it, and minister
- Goodloe Harper Bell (1832–1899) – teacher at first Seventh-day Adventist school
- Hiram Edson (1806–1882) – evangelist who introduced sanctuary doctrine and started first Seventh-day Adventist press
- Stephen N. Haskell (1833–1922) – evangelist; missionary; author; editor; president of the New England Conference (1870–1887), president of the California Conference (1879–1887 and 1891–1894) and president of the Maine Conference (1884–1886)
- J. N. Loughborough (1832–1924) – early Seventh-day Adventist pastor
- Uriah Smith (1832–1903) – author; poet; hymn writer; teacher; inventor; engraver, and editor of the Review and Herald
- Ellen G. White (1827–1915) – a founder of the Seventh-day Adventist Church; had 2,000 visions and dreams from God; wrote articles; pamphlets and books including the Conflict of the Ages series
- James Springer White (1821–1881) – a founder of the Seventh-day Adventist Church; founder of The Present Truth, and 2nd, 4th, and 6th President of the General Conference of Seventh-day Adventists (1865–1867, 1869–1871, and 1874–1880); husband of Ellen White

== Church administration leaders ==
- Stennett H. Brooks (1932–2008) – pastor and President of the Northeastern Conference of Seventh-day Adventists
- Mikhail P. Kulakov (1927–2010) – pastor; social and religious activist; Bible scholar/translator; founder of the International Association of Religious Freedom; founder of the Institute for Bible Translation; founder of the Russian Bible Society and head of the church in the former Soviet Union
- Adolf Minck (1883–1960) – a prominent leader of the Seventh-day Adventist Church in Germany during the Nazi era. From 1937 to 1950, he served as president of the Central European Division of the Church. Earlier, he led the Hungarian Union (Hungarian Diocese).
- Ella Simmons – first woman to be a Vice President of the General Conference of Seventh-day Adventists; chair of the Department of Education at Kentucky State University (1988–1990); Assistant professor and associate dean of the School of Education at the University of Louisville (1990–1997); Vice President for academic affairs at Oakwood University (1997); Provost and Vice President for Academic Administration at La Sierra University (2000–2004)
- James D. Standish – Australian who used to be the communications director, Religious Liberty and Public Affairs for the South Pacific Division of Seventh-day Adventists; also former head of news and editorial for Adventist Record (2011–2016)
- Hendrik Sumendap – Indonesian pastor and former Executive Secretary of the Southern Asia-Pacific Division of Seventh-day Adventists (2007–2008)

== Government ==
- Kwadwo Owusu Afriyie (1957–2020) – Ghanaian who was Chief Executive Officer of Forestry Commission of Ghana (2017-2020), general secretary of the New Patriotic Party (2010-2014); and lawyer who died of COVID-19
- Sir Patrick Allen ON GCMG CD – eighth Governor-General of Jamaica (2009–present) and former president of the West Indies Union
- Sir Silas Atopare (1951-2021) - GCL GCMG – seventh Governor-General of Papua New Guinea (1997–2003)
- Farley Chavez Augustine - Chief Secretary of Tobago
- Milly Babalanda - Minister for Presidency of Cabinet of Uganda (2021–present)
- Edmund Bartlett - MP of Saint Andrew Eastern (1980-1993); MP of Saint James East Central (2002-2020); Minister of Tourism (2007-2011) & 2016; Minister of State for Information, Broadcasting and Culture (1980-1989); Parliament of Jamaica (1989-2007) and Board of Affiliate Members of the United Nations World Tourism Organization
- Roscoe Bartlett – served in Maryland's 6th congressional district/U.S. House of Representatives (1993–2013)
- Samuel Bosire - High Court of Kenya and Court of Appeal of Kenya judge who was appointed the chairman of the Goldenberg Commission of Inquiry
- Simeon Bouro – Solomon Islands Ambassador to Cuba since March 2013; member of Solomon Islands National Parliament (2001–2006)
- Percival Austin Bramble (born 1931) – Chief Minister of Montserrat British West Indies (1970–1978)
- William Henry Bramble (1901–1988) – first Chief Minister of Montserrat British West Indies
- Ronald Brisé – Commissioner for the Florida Public Service Commission and former representative in the Florida House of Representatives from the 108th district
- Sir James Carlisle GCMG – second Governor-General of Antigua and Barbuda (1993–2007); dentist; member of the Royal Air Force; chairman of the National park authority;
- Ben Carson – former director of pediatric neurosurgery at Johns Hopkins Hospital; author; 2016 Republican candidate for president; Secretary of Housing and Urban Development (2017–2021)
- Nelson Castro – New York State Assemblyman, from the 86th district, (2008–2013)
- Ret Chol – former South Sudanese politician
- Cari M. Dominguez – senior of human resources at Bank of America; formerly worked at the United States Department of Labor as Director of the Office of Federal Contract Compliance Programs (1989–1993) and Assistant Secretary for Employment Standards (1991–1993); Director at Spencer Stuart (1993–1995); Partner at Heidrick & Struggles (1995–1998); Principal at Dominguez and Associates (1999–2001); 12th Chairman of Equal Employment Opportunity Commission (2001–2006); Board member of ManpowerGroup (2007–); Board of Director for International Women's Forum; Hispanic Business Roundtable; Founder of Olney Adventist Preparatory School in Olney, Maryland, and the current Senior vice president for human resources for Loma Linda University and Loma Linda University Medical Center
- Kim Gangte – member of parliament in India (1998–1999); educator & human right activist
- James E. Graves Jr. - Associate Justice of the Mississippi Supreme Court (2001-2011); United States Court of Appeals for the Fifth Circuit (2011-present)
- Philip Greaves - 5th Deputy Prime Minister of Barbados (1987-1994); Acting Governor-General of Barbados (2017-2018)
- Joachim Henry - Senate of Saint Lucia (2016-2020); MP for Castries South East (2021-present); Minister for Equity, Social Justice and Empowerment
- Hakainde Hichilema – Seventh President of Zambia, businessman and husband of Mutinta Hichilema
- Lawrence Hislop - Senator of Trinidad and Tobago
- Andrew Holness – tenth and twelfth Prime Minister of Jamaica, (2011–2012, 2016–present); Leader of the Opposition (Jamaica) (2012–2016)
- Okezie Ikpeazu – Nigerian politician, ninth Governor of Abia State (2015-2023), husband of Nkechi Ikpeazu
- Judith Jones-Morgan - former Attorney general of Saint Vincent and the Grenadines (2001-2017)
- Guy Joseph - MP for Castries South East (2006-2021); Minister for Communications, Works, Transport and Public Utilities (2006-2011); Minister for Economic Development, Housing, Urban Renewal, Transport and Civil Aviation (2016-2021)
- Samson Kisekka (1912–1999) – fifth Prime Minister of Uganda, (1986–1991); fifth Vice President of Uganda (1991–1994); physician; agriculturalist; businessman; diplomat and writer
- Niko Koffeman – Dutch politician who belongs to Party for the Animals and animal rights activist, husband of actress/TV presenter Antoinette Hertsenberg
- Jioji Konrote – President of Fiji, (2015–2021); Fiji High Commissioner to Australia (2001–2006); former Assistant Secretary General of the United Nations; retired Major-General in Fiji armed forces; former Force Commander of the United Nations interim force in Lebanon; former Ambassador Pleniopotentiary to Singapore, and former Minister of Employment, Labour Relations and Productivity
- Princess Lawes (1945-2024) - Jamaican MP of Saint Ann North Western.
- Sheila Jackson Lee (1950-2024) – U.S. Representative, 18th congressional district of Texas (Houston)
- Gordon Darcy Lilo – former Prime Minister of Solomon Islands
- David Maraga - High Court of Kenya (2003-2011); Court of Appeal of Kenya (2012-2016); 14th Chief Justice of Kenya (2016-2021) and Supreme Court of Kenya (2016-2021)
- James Marape – eight Prime Minister of Papua New Guinea (2019–present)
- Greg Mathis - retired Michigan 36th District Court judge and reality courtroom show judge
- Eunice Michiles – Brazilian senator
- Floyd Morris – Jamaica's first blind senator (1998–2007), Minister of State in the Ministry of Labour and Social Security (2001–2007), twelfth president of the Senate of Jamaica (2013–2016) and author
- Phelekezela Mphoko – Zimbabwean businessman, former diplomat, former military commander, and Vice President of Zimbabwe under President Robert Mugabe
- Rose Namayanja – Ugandan lawyer; columnist; author; security sector manager and politician
- John Nkomo (1934–2013) – Zimbabwean politician
- Samuel Sipepa Nkomo – Zimbabwe Minister of Water Resources Development and Management
- Manuel Noriega (1934–2017) – dictator of Panama who joined the Seventh-day Adventist Church
- George Nga Ntafu (1943–2015) – Malawian statesman, former Cabinet Minister, and Malawi Parliament Chief Whip
- Ron Oden – African American former openly gay 19th Mayor of Palm Springs (2003–2007) and former ordained minister
- Sam Ongeri – Kenyan Member of Parliament for Nyaribari Masaba Constituency (1988-1992;1997-2002 and 2007-2013), Cabinet Minister for Technical and Vocational Education (1988-1992), Minister of Foreign Affairs (2012-2013), Kisii County senator (2017–present); professor and physician
- Harold Bud Otis – former president of Review and Herald Publishing Association (1978–1988) and president of Frederick County, Maryland
- Alex Otti - tenth Governor of Abia State (2023–present)
- Jerry Pettis (1916–1975) – member of the U.S. House of Representatives, who represented California's 33rd Congressional District (1966–1975) and 37th Congressional District (1975)
- Shirley Neil Pettis (1924–2016) – member of the U.S. House of Representatives, who represented California's 37th Congressional District (1975–1979)
- Sir Lynden Pindling NH KCMG JP PC (1930-2000) - 1st Prime Minister of the Bahamas (1969-1992); 2nd Premier of the Bahamas (1967-1969); Parliament of The Bahamas (1956-1997) and Minister of Finance of the Bahamas (1984-1990)
- Sir Job Pomat CMG – Papua New Guinean Speaker of the National Parliament of Papua New Guinea (2017–present)
- Henry Puna – Prime Minister of the Cook Islands
- Ngereteina Puna – teacher; MP for Arutanga-Reureu-Nikaupara (1989–1999); Speaker of the Cook Islands Parliament (1999–2001), and Minister of Education for Geoffrey Henry (2011–2012)
- Sir John Pundari KBE CMG – Papua New Guinean former Speaker of the National Parliament (1997–1999); Deputy Prime Minister and Minister for Women and Youth (1999); Minister for Lands (2001); Minister for Foreign Affairs (2001); Minister for Mining (2010–2011), and Minister for Environment and Conservation (2012–present)
- Menissa Rambally - member of the Parliament of Saint Lucia (1997-2006); Cabinet of Saint Lucia (1997-1999) holding multiple positions such as: Parliamentary Secretary for the Ministry of Tourism and Civil Aviation; Acting Minister of Health, Gender Relations and Family Affairs; Acting Minister for Education, Human Resource Development, Youth and Sports; and Acting Minister for Commerce, Industry and Consumer Affairs. Minister of Tourism and Civil Aviation (2000-2001); Minister for Social Transformation, Culture and Local Government (2001-2006); Minister of Ecclesiastical Affairs
- Keith Rowley - seventh Prime Minister of Trinidad and Tobago
- Raul Ruiz – member of the U.S. House of Representatives, representing California's 36th congressional district (2013–)
- Gibbs Salika KBE- Chief Justice of the Supreme Court of Papua New Guinea
- Desley Scott – Australian politician; member for Electoral district of Woodridge in the Parliament of Queensland, 2001–2015
- Derek Sloan – member of the Hastings—Lennox and Addington (2019–2021)
- Manasseh Sogavare – Prime Minister of the Solomon Islands, (2000–2001), (2006–2007), (2014–2017) and (2019–present); Leader of the Opposition in Solomon Islands (2007–2010)
- Sir Louis Straker KCMG - Vice President of the Unity Labour Party; Deputy Prime Minister of Saint Vincent and the Grenadines (2001-2010) & (2015-2020); Minister of Foreign Affairs, Commerce and Trade (2001-2005); Minister of Transport, Works and Housing (2005)
- John F. Street – Mayor of the City of Philadelphia (2000–2008)
- Mana Strickland (1918–1996) – Minister of Education of Cook Islands
- Robert Lee Stump (1927–2003) – served in the Arizona House of Representatives and the Arizona State Senate (1959–1976); member of the U.S. House of Representatives, representing Arizona's 3rd Congressional District (1977–2003)
- Sione Taione – Tongan politician
- Hannu Takkula – Finnish politician who was member of Parliament of Finland (1995–2004) and member of European Parliament (2004–2018)
- Marianne Thieme – founder and parliamentary leader of the Dutch animal rights party Animal Party & author
- Ronald Sapa Tlau – Indian member for Mizoram in the Rajya Sabha since June 2014
- Roman Tmetuchl (1926–1999) – Palau governor of Airai; started Palau's first bank and also start a construction company.
- Carolyn Harding Votaw (1879–1951) – public officeholder in Washington, D.C.; youngest sister of President Warren G. Harding, and missionary to Myanmar (1905–1914)
- James Ronald Webster (1926–2016) – led Anguilla Revolution of 1967; former Chief Minister of Anguilla
- Surangel S. Whipps - founder of Surangel and Sons Company; President of the Senate of Palau (2005), (2007-2009); Speaker of the House (1993-1996)
- Surangel Whipps Jr. – Senator of Palau (2008-2016); President of Palau (2021–present); CEO and President of Surangel and Sons Company from 1992-2021 and lead it to becoming the largest Palauan owned company.
- George A. Williams (1864–1946) – served as Lieutenant Governor of Nebraska (1925–1931)
- Jorge Talbot Zavala (1921–2014) – Ecuadorian Representative and Secretary of the Camara de Diputados, Quito, Ecuador; Nomina de Legisladores Nacionales (1950–1955), Archivo Nacional del Ecuador (1950–1955)

== Scientists, doctors, nurses, and engineers ==
- Phyllis B. Acosta (1933–2018) – public health researcher who pioneered nutritional therapy for management of phenylketonuria
- Leonard Lee Bailey (1942–2019) – world-renowned heart surgeon who transplanted a baboon's heart into a premature-born baby with underdeveloped heart
- Lottie Isbell Blake (1876–1976) – first SDA Black Physician
- Leonard R. Brand – Loma Linda University paleobiologist
- Mary E. Britton (1855–1925) – physician; educator; journalist; civil rights activist and Suffragist
- Ferdinand Budicki II (1871–1951) - Croatian engineer, adventurer and motorsports pioneer.
- Margaret Caro (1848–1938) – first women Dentist on the Register of New Zealand; lecturer; social reformer, and writer
- Alexander A. Clerk – Ghanaian-American teacher; psychiatrist; Sleep medicine specialist and the director of the world's first sleep medical clinic at Stanford University Medical Center
- Lenna F. Cooper (1875–1961) – American dietitian and co-founder of the Academy of Nutrition and Dietetics
- Winston J. Craig – American registered dietitian and nutrition writer.
- Hulda Crooks (1896–1997) – American mountaineer, dietitian and vegetarianism activist
- Hans Diehl (1946–2023) – physician and founder of the Complete Health Improvement Program (CHIP).
- Robert Gentry (1933–2020) – nuclear physicist and young Earth creationist, known for his claims that radiohalos provide evidence for a young age of the Earth
- Howard Gimbel – Canadian ophthalmologist; senior editor; international speaker; professor at Loma Linda University and associate professor at University of Calgary, has won many awards including the Alberta Order of Excellence and Order of Canada
- Audrey Gregory - Jamaican American health care administrator at AdventHealth and former nurse
- Frank Jobe (1925–2014) – orthopedist and sports medicine physician who worked for the Los Angeles Dodgers (1968–2008); 26 years as a consultant for the PGA Tour, PGA Tour Champions and Senior PGA Championship and named emeritus physician for the PGA Tour; clinical professor at Keck School of Medicine of USC; inducted into the American Orthopedic Society of Sports Medicine Hall of Fame, Professional Baseball Athletic Trainers Hall of Fame and Shrine of the Eternals; received the Dave Winfield Humanitarian Award; was a World War II veteran who won the Bronze Star Medal, Combat Medical Badge and Glider Badge
- Nettie Florence Keller (1875–1974) – oldest practicing doctor in the world; feminist; prohibitionist; social reformer and missionary to New Zealand
- Daniel H. Kress (1862–1956) – Canadian physician and missionary to Australia, England and New Zealand.
- Lauretta E. Kress (1863–1955) – American physician; wife of Daniel Kress; and missionary to Australia and England.
- Jeffrey Kuhlman - White House physician to Bill Clinton, George W. Bush and Barack Obama; Florida Hospital Chief Medical Officer and employee of Naval Aerospace Medical Institute.
- Anita Mackey (1914–2024) – African-american social worker and supercentenarian
- Alice Garrett Marsh (1908–1997) – dietitian and vegetarianism activist
- Frank Lewis Marsh (1899–1992) – creationist and the first Adventist to earn a doctoral degree in biology
- Ora Kress Mason (1888–1970) – American nurse and physician; and daughter of Daniel and Lauretta Kress.
- George McCready Price (1870–1963) – missionary and leading early creationist
- Ruth Janetta Temple (1892–1984) – first African American doctor in California and opened first medical clinic in Los Angeles
- Paul Nobuo Tatsuguchi (1911–1943) – Japanese surgeon in the Imperial Japanese Army
- Archibald W. Truman (1884–1977) – physician and vegetarianism activist
- Walter Veith – South African zoologist, author, creationist and end times lecturer
- Kathleen Keen Zolber - American president of the Academy of Nutrition and Dietetics

== Sports ==
- Gretchen Abaniel – Filipino professional boxer who won the Women's International Boxing Association Minimumweight Title; Women's International Boxing Federation Minimumweight Title; Global Boxing Union Minimumweight Title; WIBA Intercontinental Minimumweight Title; WBC International Minimumweight Title and a contestant on The Amazing Race Philippines 2
- David Alaba – Austrian association football player and has a sister Rose May Alaba
- Luis Aponte – retired Venezuelan baseball player
- Ed Correa – retired Puerto Rican Major League Baseball pitcher
- Grace Daley – retired African American Women's National Basketball Association basketball player
- Devaun DeGraff – retired Bermudian association football player
- Jimmy Haarhoff – retired British association football player
- Priscah Jeptoo – Kenyan Marathon runner, Olympic and world medalist; winner of the 2013 London Marathon and 2013 New York City Marathon, and founder of Better Living Marathon
- Abel Kirui – Kenyan marathon runner, two-time world champion, Olympic medalist, 2016 Chicago Marathon winner, and founder of Better Living Marathon
- Elijah Lagat – Kenyan marathon runner, winner of the 1997 Berlin Marathon, 1998 Prague Marathon and 2000 Boston Marathon
- Ljiljana Ljubisic – Canadian who won gold medal in discus and bronze in shot at the 1992 Summer Paralympics & won bronze in the same events at the 1996 Summer Paralympics
- Germaine Mason (1983-2017) - Jamaican who was an Olympic medalist high jumper
- Archie Moore (1916–1998) – American professional boxer (Light Heavyweight World Champion December 1952 – May 1962)
- Amos Tirop Matui – Kenyan marathon runner, winner of the 2005 Singapore Marathon, 2009 Country Music Marathon and Hamburg Half Marathon, and founder of Better Living Marathon.
- Vitor Ressurreição – Brazilian association football goalkeeper
- Carlos Roa – retired Argentine association football goalkeeper
- Andrea Silenzi – retired Italian association football player
- Davion Taylor - African American linebacker in the National Football League
- Johan Vonlanthen - retired Colombian association football winger

== Theologians, ministers and evangelists ==
- M. L. Andreasen (1876–1962) – theologian, protested against the book Questions on Doctrine, and was influential in "historic Adventism"
- Samuele Bacchiocchi (1938–2008) – theologian and author who wrote From Sabbath to Sunday, based on his study at the Pontifical Gregorian University, at which he is the only non-Catholic to have enrolled
- Bryan W. Ball – theologian; academic; author; teacher; former principal of Avondale College, and former president of South Pacific Division of Seventh-day Adventists
- Doug Batchelor - pastor; evangelist and president of Amazing Facts
- John Burden (1862–1942) – minister; administrator, and medical missionary to Australia
- Edwin Butz (1864–1956) – pastor and missionary to Australia and Tonga
- Arthur Carscallen (1879–1964) – pastor; administrator; linguist; publisher, and missionary to Kenya
- John Carter – pastor; evangelist, and founder of The Carter Report
- E. E. Cleveland (1921–2009) – pastor; evangelist; civil rights leader; author, and teacher at Oakwood College
- Raymond Cottrell (1911–2003) – theologian; teacher; writer; editor; associate editor of the Adventist Review and the Seventh-day Adventist Bible Commentary, and missionary to China
- Richard M. Davidson – Old Testament scholar, and author of Flame of Yahweh
- Herbert E. Douglass (1927–2014) – American theologian who was president of Atlantic Union College (1967–1970); associate editor of Adventist Review (1970–1976); associate book editor and vice-president for Editorial Development at Pacific Press Publishing Association (1979–1985); president of Weimar Institute (1985–1992); vice-president for philanthropy at Adventist Heritage Ministry (1997–2001), and consultant for Amazing Facts (2003–2005)
- Jon Dybdahl (1942–2023) – theologian and college administrator
- Henry Feyerabend (1931–2006) – Canadian evangelist; singer, and author
- Mark Finley – pastor; evangelist and 2nd Speaker/Director of It Is Written 1991–2004
- Desmond Ford (1929–2019) – Australian pastor fired for criticizing the investigative judgment teaching, resulting in the most controversial dismissal ever in the church
- Le Roy Froom (1890– 1974) – pastor; scholar and historian, one of the leading Adventist apologists of his time
- Paul A. Gordon (1930–2009) – former director of the Ellen G. White Estate
- Gerhard Hasel (1935–1994) – theologian; Professor of Old Testament & Biblical Theology; Dean at Theological Seminary at Andrews University, his childhood experience in Nazi Germany are recounted in the book A Thousand Shall Fall
- Edward Heppenstall (1901–1994) – theologian and Bible scholar
- Edward Hilliard (1851–1936) – pastor and missionary to Australia and Tonga
- John F. Huenergardt (1875–1955) – pastor; teacher; administrator, and missionary
- Merritt Kellogg (1832–1921) – doctor; pastor and missionary to Australia; Niue; Pitcairn; Samoa, and Tonga
- George R. Knight – historian, author, educator, theologian
- Väinö Kohtanen (1889–1963) – Finnish pioneer, evangelist, college president and conference president in Finland in the first half of the 20th century
- Hans Karl LaRondelle (1929–2011) – theologian and author
- John G. Matteson (1835–1896) – Danish American; minister; evangelist; teacher; missionary to Denmark and Norway; musician; editor, and publisher
- Andrew Nelson (1893–1975) – scholar of East Asian languages and literature and missionary to Japan
- Dwight Nelson – pastor at Andrews University, now retired.
- Francis D. Nichol (1897–1966) – apologist, authored a classic defense of Ellen White; editor of Review and Herald, now Adventist Review, (1966–1966); supervising editor of the Seventh-day Adventist Bible Commentary.
- James R. Nix – Director of the Ellen G. White Estate
- Elizaphan Ntakirutimana (1924–2007) – pastor; administrator, and participant in Rwandan genocide
- Robert W. Olson (1920–2013) – former director of the Ellen G. White Estate
- Arthur Patrick (1934–2013) – theologian; teacher; pastor; evangelist; administer, and historian at Avondale College
- Jon Paulien – leading expert on the Book of Revelation
- Richard Rice – developed the "open theism" understanding of God
- H. M. S. Richards (1894–1985) – poet, evangelist; founder and 1st Speaker/Director of Voice of Prophecy; pioneer in religious radio broadcasting; the H. M. S. Richards Divinity School at La Sierra University is named in his honor
- Ángel Manuel Rodríguez – pastor; professor; theologian, and former director of the Biblical Research Institute
- Samir Selmanovic – pastor and author
- George Vandeman (1916–2000) – popular evangelist who founded It Is Written (1956–1991)
- Alfred Vaucher (1887–1993) – French theologian; church historian and bibliographer
- Morris Venden (1932–2013) – proponent of salvation and sanctification by faith alone, a strong supporter of the Pillars of Seventh-day Adventism including the investigative judgment, known for his parables and humor.
- Juan Carlos Viera (1938–2016) – former director of the Ellen G. White Estate
- Arthur L. White (1907–1991) – former director of the Ellen G. White Estate; son of William C. White and grandson of Ellen G. White
- William C. White (1854–1937) – former director of the Ellen G. White Estate and son of Ellen G. White
- Benjamin G. Wilkinson (1872–1968) – theologian whose writings influenced the American fundamentalist King-James-Only Movement
- Kenneth H. Wood (1917–2008) – pastor; author; editor of Adventist Review; missionary to China, and Chairman of the Ellen G. White Estate
- Norman Young – New Testament scholar

== Military ==
- Admiral Barry Black – 2nd African American Seventh-day Adventist to become chaplain in U.S. Navy Reserve; Chief of Chaplains of the United States Navy (2000–2003) and first African American Chaplain of the United States Senate (2003–present)
- Harlon Block (1924–1945) – one of the six U.S. Marines captured in the famous photograph Raising the Flag on Iwo Jima; appears on the right of the photo, holding the base of the flagpole; won a Purple Heart and other military awards
- Desmond Doss (1919–2006) – conscientious objector to receive the U.S. Medal of Honor from President Harry S. Truman and subject of the Hollywood biopic Hacksaw Ridge
- Jovie Espenido – Police Chief Inspector of Philippine National Police in the Philippines under President Duterte's war against drugs program
- Biuku Gasa and Eroni Kumana – Solomon Islanders who rescued the surviving crew of the sunken United States boat PT-109, including its commander, future U.S. president John F. Kennedy, during the Pacific Ocean theatre of World War II; were educated at Adventist missionary schools
- Bo Mya (1927–2006) – Karen rebel leader from Myanmar
- Brigadier General Loree Sutton – American who served in the United States Army and politician
- Alois Vocásek (1896–2003) – last surviving Czechoslovak veteran of World War I and was the oldest member in the church in the Czech Republic
- Gabrielle Weidner (1914–1945) – Dutch resistance fighter who died of malnutrition at a Nazi concentration camp & sister of Johan Hendrik Weidner
- Johan Hendrik Weidner (1912–1994) – organized the Dutch-Paris underground network to coordinate the escapes of more than 1,000 people from Nazi-occupied France; later emigrated to the United States and operated a chain of health-food stores
- Ellsworth Wareham (1914-2018) - was an American cardiothoracic surgeon, centenarian and a World War II navy veteran.

== Other ==
- Johnny Barnes (1923-2016) – a Bermuda institution mentioned him in guidebooks and profiled him in two documentary films
- Lindy Chamberlain – Australian Adventist famous for being wrongfully convicted of the murder of her daughter Azaria at Uluru; it was later shown that a dingo took Lindy's baby and was the subject of the film Evil Angels
- Michael Chamberlain (1944-2017) – pastor from Australia falsely accused of murdering his daughter Azaria and was the subject in the film Evil Angels
- Michał Belina Czechowski (1818-1876) – missionary to Italy, Romania, and Switzerland
- Queen Mantfombi Dlamini (1953-2021) – wife of Zulu King Goodwill Zwelithini kaBhekuzulu
- Rosetta Douglass (1839-1906) - African-american civil rights activist
- S. M. I. Henry (1839–1900) – evangelist for the Woman's Christian Temperance Union; wrote tracts, pamphlets and books
- Mutinta Hichilema - First Lady of Zambia as wife of Hakainde Hichilema
- Albert Horsley (1866-1954) – miner who murdered former Idaho Governor Frank Steunenberg
- Nkechi Ikpeazu – Nigerian charities worker; founder of Vicar Hope Foundation and wife of Okezie Ikpeazu
- Jon Johanson – Australian aviator who flew around the world three times, in 1995, 1996, and 2000 which he flew over the North Pole and he flew to the South Pole in 2003
- Louise Little (1897–1991) – Grenadian-American activist and mother of Malcolm X
- Irene Morgan (1917–2007) – African-American who refused to surrender her bus seat and was taken to court, preceding the famous Rosa Parks case
- Barbara O'Neill – Australian naturopath who, in 2019, was banned indefinitely from providing any health service or education for her role in providing dangerous health advice.
- Evora Bucknum Perkins (1851–1929) – American educator, cookbook writer, and missionary
- Gloria Salii of Palau
- Sandra Seifert – Filipino/German fashion model who won Miss Earth-Air at the Miss Earth 2009 pageant
- John Tay (1832-1892) – Missionary to Fiji and Pitcairn
- David Trim - Historian, archivist and educator
- Lynne Waihee – former First Lady of Hawaii as wife of the former Governor John D. Waihe'e III

== Former baptized members and people raised ==
- Anthony B – Jamaican deejay and member of the Rastafari movement
- Les Balsiger – belonged to a Seventh-day Adventist Church that was disfellowshipped for firing their minister
- Joseph R. Bartlett – former member of the Maryland House of Delegates who was raised Seventh-day Adventist, and son of Roscoe Bartlett
- Jungkook – idol, BTS member raised by an Adventist mother
- Ryan J. Bell – former pastor who became an atheist
- Wayne Bent – former pastor who founded Lord Our Righteousness Church
- Usain Bolt – Jamaican Olympic sprinter who competed in three Summer Olympics (2008, 2012, and 2016), winning eight gold medals; raised Seventh-day Adventist by his mother
- Nana Kwaku Bonsam – Ghanaian witch doctor and fetish priest
- Robert Brinsmead – edited Present Truth Magazine
- Joyce Bryant (1941-2022) – African-American singer/dancer, and former Seventh-day Adventist
- D. M. Canright (1840–1919) – pastor who left over difficulties concerning Ellen White
- Bill Chambers – Australian country singer
- Kasey Chambers – Australian country singer/songwriter and daughter of Bill Chambers who was raised in the Seventh-day Adventist Church
- Nash Chambers – Australian country singer and son of Bill Chambers who was raised in the Seventh-day Adventist Church
- Johnson Charles - Saint Lucia cricketer who was raised in the Seventh-day Adventist Church by his parents.
- Ludwig R. Conradi (1856–1939) – missionary and evangelist
- Daniel Cooper (1881–1923) – New Zealand child murderer and illegal abortionist who was disfellowshipped
- Heidi Cruz – wife of Ted Cruz; former employee for President George W. Bush; bank employee, and raised Seventh-day Adventist by her parents
- Kat Von D – tattoo artist; model; musician; author; entrepreneur; and television personality and raised Seventh-day Adventist by her parents
- Clifton Davis – former Seventh-day Adventist pastor; songwriter; singer and actor
- Clive Doyle (1941-2022) - Branch Davidian who had been raised in the Seventh-day Adventist Church
- Livingstone Fagan - British african who left the Seventh-day Adventist Church and joined the Branch Davidians
- Luke Ford – Australian/American writer; blogger; and former pornography gossip columnist
- Muma Gee - Nigerian pop singer-songwriter, actress and fashion designer who was raised in the Seventh-day Adventist Church by her mother
- Vincent Harding (1931–2014) – former African American Seventh-day Adventist pastor who became a Mennonite pastor; civil rights author, and associate of Martin Luther King Jr. who wrote the main draft of King's 1967 speech "Beyond Vietnam: A Time to Break Silence".
- Earle Hilgert (1923-2020) - American academic theologian, administrator and librarian
- Victor Houteff (1885–1955) – Bulgarian who founded the Shepherd's Rod who was disfellowshipped by the Seventh-day Adventist Church
- Moses Hull (1836–1907) – former pastor who became a Spiritualist lecturer and author
- Magic Johnson - African American who was raised in the Seventh-day Adventist Church by his mother
- Angus T. Jones - American child actor who played Jake Harper in Two and a Half Men
- John Harvey Kellogg (1852–1943) – medical doctor who was disfellowshipped, co-founder of cornflakes with brother Will Keith Kellogg and subject of the Hollywood film The Road to Wellville
- Hamaas Abdul Khaalis (1921–2003) – Islamic leader who led the 1977 Hanafi Siege
- David Koresh (1959–1993) – American leader of the Branch Davidians who was disfellowshiped by the Seventh-day Adventist Church
- Bob Lanier (1948-2022) - African American National Basketball Association player who was raised in the Seventh-day Adventist Church by his mother
- Sandra Lee - American celebrity chef and author raised in the Seventh-day Adventist Church
- Zhang Lingsheng – helped start the True Jesus Church
- Luciano – Jamaican roots reggae singer
- Lee Boyd Malvo – former Seventh-day Adventist and convicted murderer who was connected to the D.C. sniper attacks in the Washington metropolitan area and converted to Islam
- Felix Manalo - founder of the new religious movement known as the Iglesia ni Cristo after being disfellowshipped from Adventism.
- Jesse Martin – boy sailor; his parents were Adventists
- Wayne Martin - American who left the Seventh-day Adventist Church and joined the Branch Davidians
- Kenneth Chi McBride – raised Seventh-day Adventist by his parents; singer-songwriter & actor
- Brian McKnight – raised Seventh-day Adventist by his parents; Grammy Award winning singer-songwriter;producer; radio host, and 2009 The Celebrity Apprentice contestant
- Ronald Numbers – science historian and author of The Creationists, and former Adventist lecturer
- David Pendleton – former member of the Hawaii House of Representatives and 2002 candidate for lieutenant governor, now a Catholic
- T. M. Preble (1810–1907) – wrote articles against the Seventh-day Sabbath in The World's Crisis and a book First-Day Sabbath
- Forrest Preston – American billionaire who was raised in the Seventh-day Adventist Church, the founder of Life Care Centers of America
- Cherie Priest – former Seventh-day Adventist, American novelist and blogger
- Prince (1958–2016) – raised in the church, later converted to the Jehovah's Witnesses
- Mark "Chopper" Read (1954–2013) – notorious Australian ex-criminal and author of real and fictional crime books; claims in his books to have been raised Adventist by a strictly devout mother
- Walter T. Rea (1922–2014) – former pastor for his criticisms of the inspiration of Ellen G. White; author of The White Lie
- Busta Rhymes – American rapper, producer and actor, raised in Brooklyn by Seventh-day Adventist Jamaican-immigrant parents; later converted to Islam
- Ruth Riddle - Canadian Branch Davidian who was raised in the Seventh-day Adventist Church
- Terrence Roberts – former member who was one of the nine African American students who desegregated Little Rock Central High School
- Benjamin Roden (1902–1978) – religious leader and organizer of the Branch Davidian Seventh-day Adventist Church, who was disfellowshipped
- Lois Roden (1916–1986) – wife of Benjamin Roden and president of the Branch Davidians after her husband's death
- G. G. Rupert (1847–1922) – former American Seventh-day Adventist minister who founded Independent Church of God
- Paul Rusesabagina – internationally honored for saving 1,268 civilians during the Rwandan genocide; the subject of 2004 film Hotel Rwanda; describes himself as a "lapsed Adventist" in his autobiography
- Lena Sadler (1875–1939) – American surgeon and obstetrician who was the wife of William S. Sadler
- William S. Sadler (1875–1969) – American surgeon; self trained psychiatrist and author who helped publish The Urantia Book
- Ahn Sahng-hong (1918–1985) – Korean pastor and founder of Witnesses of Jesus Church of God
- Dumelang Saleshando – Botswanan politician raised Seventh-day Adventist by his mother, now is member of an unspecified church
- Daren Sammy - St. Lucian cricketer who was raised in the Seventh-day Adventist Church by his parents
- Augusto César Sandino (1895–1934) – Nicaraguan revolutionary and politician, cooperativist, member of Adventist church in his youth, adopted vegetarianism due to church teachings
- Steve Schneider - American Branch Davidian who was raised in the Seventh-day Adventist Church by his parents
- Vladimir Shelkov (1895–1980) – former Ukrainian Seventh-day Adventist minister and leader of the True and Free Seventh-day Adventists
- Elle Simone (1976-2026) - African-american who was a cook on America's Test Kitchen, was raised in the Seventh-day Adventist Church.
- Sirhan Sirhan – Palestinian convicted of the assassination of U.S. Senator Robert F. Kennedy
- Bette Smith - African-american soul, rock and blues singer who was raised in the Seventh-day Adventist Church by her parents.
- Heinz Spanknöbel (1893–1947) – former German Seventh-day Adventist minister and led the pro Nazi Friends of New Germany
- Mathew Staver – former American Seventh-day Adventist pastor who became a Southern Baptist; professor and lawyer; also founding member and Chairman of Liberty Counsel and dean at Liberty University
- Sean Taylor (1983–2007) – former African American member who played for the Washington Redskins and was murdered
- Roch Thériault (1947-2011) - Canadian who founded the Ant Hill Kids and was disfellowshipped by the Seventh-day Adventist Church
- Iya Villania – Filipina host, actress and performer, wife of Drew Arellano
- Paul Wei – Chinese evangelist of the True Jesus Church
- Marcus Wesson - African American mass murderer and child rapist who was raised in the Seventh-day Adventist Church by his mother
- Richard Wright (1908–1960) – author whose autobiography Black Boy mentions clashes with his Adventist family
- Malcolm X (1925–1965) – American Muslim minister and human rights activist, raised Adventist by his mother

== See also ==
- Seventh-day Adventism in popular culture
