= Maphosa =

Maphosa is a Zimbabwean surname. Notable people with the surname include:

- Joe Maphosa, a Zimbabwean-British boxer
- Mthulisi Maphosa, a Zimbabwean footballer
- Norman Maphosa, vice-chancellor of Solusi University
