= Alaba =

Alaba may refer to:

- Alaba (gastropod), a sea snails genus in the family Litiopidae
- Alaba International Market, an electronics market located in Ojo, Lagos State, Nigeria
- Halaba people or Halaba, an ethnic group in Ethiopia
- Halaba Kulito, the administrative center of that district
- Alaba-Kʼabeena language, a language spoken in Ethiopia by the Alaba
- Alaba (surname)
- The Basque name for the Spanish commune of Álava-Araba
