= Morneau =

Origin
- Region of origin: France

Other names
- Variant forms: Morineau, Morneault

Morneau is a surname of French origin, and may refer to:

- Bill Morneau (born 1962), Canadian businessman and politician
- David Morneau (born 1975), American composer
- Doug Morneau, Canadian politician
- Isabelle Morneau (born 1976), Canadian soccer player
- Jack Morneau (born 1926), Canadian football player
- Justin Morneau (born 1981), Canadian baseball player
- Louis Morneau, American film director and scenarist
- Marie-Josée Morneau (born 1969), Canadian judoka
- Michelle Morneau, one of the perpetrators of the 1999 Kingwood robbery incidents
- Robert F. Morneau (born 1938), American Catholic clergyman
- Roger Morneau (1925–1998), Canadian spiritual writer

== See also ==
- Morneau Shepell, a company later known as LifeWorks
