= Homer Russell Salisbury =

American religious leader (1870-1915)

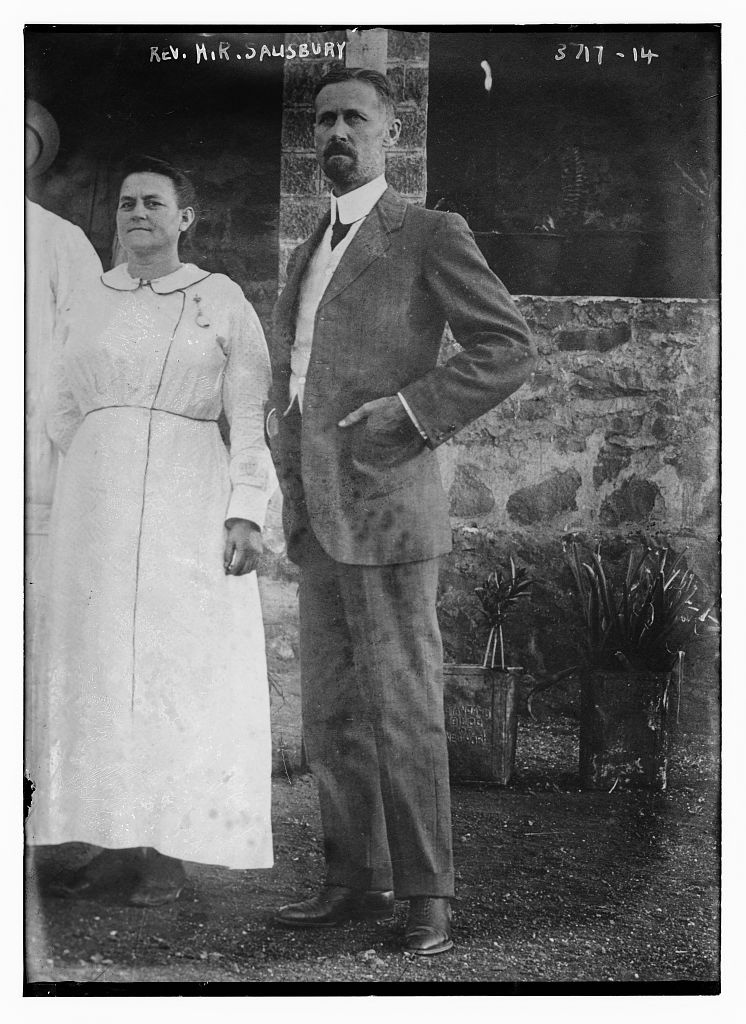
Homer Russell Salisbury (1870–1915) portrait circa 1915

Homer Russell Salisbury (May 27, 1870 – December 30, 1915) was a Seventh-day Adventist educator and administrator who started the first Adventist school in England. He died at sea aboard the SS Persia on December 30, 1915, when it was sunk by a German submarine during World War I.

== Biography ==
He was born in Battle Creek, Michigan, on May 27, 1870, to Burleigh Russell Salisbury. He had a brother who migrated to Australia. He married Lenna Elizabeth Whitney.

In 1901 Salisbury founded the first Seventh-day Adventist school in England, Duncombe Hall College, and was the principal there for five years. In 1904 he became a minister. In 1905 Salisbury became president of the South England Conference. He taught at Claremont Union College in South Africa.

Salisbury was made president of the Indian Union Mission in 1913.

He boarded the SS Persia in Marseille, headed for India. He died on December 30, 1915, aged 45, when the ship was sunk by a German submarine during World War I.
