= Alaba (surname) =

Alaba is a surname. Notable people with the surname include:

- Bayo Alaba (fl. 2024), British politician
- David Alaba (born 1992), Austrian footballer
- Rose May Alaba (born 1994), Austrian singer songwriter
