= Manuel Escórcio =

- Born: Manuel Maria Lamarque Escórcio; Lourenço Marques, Mozambique
- Origin: Mozambique; South Africa
- Genres: Afrikaans pop
- Occupation: Musician
- Instrument: Voice
- Website: www.manuelescorcio.co.za

Manuel Escórcio is a South African tenor who performs in Afrikaans, English and Portuguese. Escórcio was born in Lourenço Marques, Mozambique but started his musical career at Helderberg College in Somerset-West, South Africa when he was 16 years of age.

Escórcio has performed in South Africa, the US, Canada, Brazil, Portugal, Venezuela, the Philippines and Australia.

In 1981, Escórcio was awarded the Order of Prince Henry.

== Personal life ==
Escórcio is a member of the Seventh-day Adventist Church.
