= John F. Huenergardt =

Christian missionary (1875-1955)

Personal life
- Born: 1875 Russia
- Died: 1955 (aged 79–80)
- Education: Broadview College and Theological Seminary

Religious life
- Religion: Christianity
- Sect: Adventism

John F. Huenergardt (1875–1955) was one of the pioneers of the Southeastern-European Adventism, a Seventh-day Adventist minister, teacher, administrator.

Born in a German colony in Russia, as a child migrated with his parents to America, on the S.S. City of Berlin in 1876. In 1898 he was sent to Pannonian Basin to begin work there. He learned Hungarian and in 1902 became a superintendent of the Hungarian and Balkan States Mission Field and later president of the Hungarian Conference in 1907, and of the Danube Union Conference in 1912 with the headquarters in Budapest. This Conference embraced the areas of Romania, Bulgaria, Yugoslavia and Hungary.

He trained workers and book evangelists and began to issue some publications in the local languages. In 1910 German evangelists came to his help.

In 1919 he moved back to the United States. He joined the Broadview College and Theological Seminary. From 1925 till 1929 he was associate secretary of the Bureau Of Home Missions of the General Conference.

He went back to Europe and early of the 1930s he was the president of the Yugoslavian Union Conference. In 1935 he returned to the United States, where he retired one year later. Then he pastored German churches in California.
