= Väinö Kohtanen =

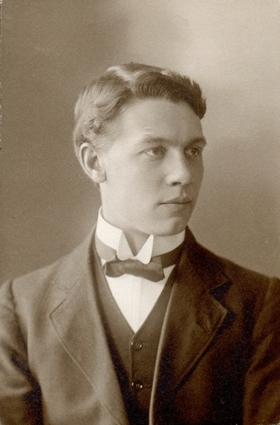
- Väinö Bernhard Kohtanen 1912
- Pronunciation: [ˈʋæi̯nø ˈkoʈɛnɪn]
- Born: 1889; Finland
- Died: 1963 (aged 73–74)
- Education: Stanborough College
- Occupations: Evangelist, college president
- Years active: 1912–1954
- Known for: Spread of Seventh-day Adventism in Scandinavia
- Spouse: Kirsti Grundström (m. 1912)
- Children: 2

Ecclesiastical career
- Religion: Seventh-day Adventism
- Offices held: College President of Toivonlinnan Yhteiskoulu; President of the Seventh-day Adventist Church in Finland

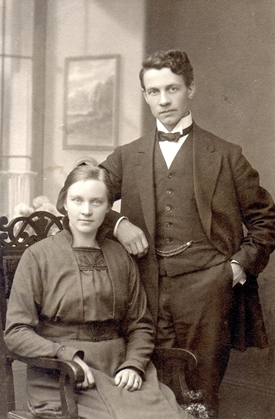
Väinö and Kirsti Kohtanen 1920

Väinö Bernhard Kohtanen (1889–1963) was an early pioneer, evangelist, college president and later, President of the Seventh-day Adventist Church in Finland during a career which spanned from 1912 - 1954. Kohtanen was one of the first Finnish speaking evangelists of that faith, and is credited with critically contributing to the introduction and spread of Seventh-day Adventism in Finland and parts of Scandinavia. Through primarily his efforts and those of two colleagues, Aarne Rintala and Kaarlo Soisalo, church membership in Finland grew rapidly, especially among young people. A popular speaker, Kohtanen's evangelistic meetings held in Helsinki in 1914, when he was just 25 years of age, were held in a hall that seated over 800 persons which he was able to "fill to overflowing" over consecutive nights. During his presidency of the Seventh-day Adventist Church in Finland from 1933 - 1938, membership increased by 32%.

Upon completion of his studies in theology in England, Kohtanen returned to Finland to work as a public evangelist from 1912 - 1918. He was then appointed College President of Toivonlinnan Yhteiskoulu, the Seventh-day Adventist college in Finland from 1919 - 1920. Due to his success as a public evangelist he was appointed to his first administrative position in 1920 within the headquarters of the Seventh-day Adventist Church in Finland at age 30. This position was the newly created Home Mission Secretary position, and made him responsible for all evangelism and church growth in Finland and parts of Scandinavia. His recommendation for this position came directly from the world headquarters of the Seventh-day Adventist Church in the United States. In 1933 he was elected to serve as President of the Seventh-day Adventist Church in Finland, a position he held until 1938, after which he returned to evangelism. Towards the end of his career, he accepted an appointment as the Biblical Studies lecturer at Toivonlinnan Yhteiskoulu in 1943 and remained there until 1946.

Kohtanen worked for the Seventh-day Adventist church his entire career and retired in 1954. He and his wife continued to undertake volunteer projects until his death in 1963.

== Early life and education ==
Born in 1889 in Finland, Kohtanen joined the Young Men's Christian Association (YMCA) in his teens and it was here that he met Aarne Rintala. Rintala had joined the Seventh-day Adventist faith and after his baptism began to hold Bible studies with his friends from the Young Men's Christian Association, including Kohtanen and Kaarlo Soisalo. This resulted in Kohtanen accepting the Adventist faith and prompted him to pursue academic study and a career in ministry. Rintala, Kohtanen, and Soisalo all went on to become evangelists and administrators in the Seventh-day Adventist Church in Europe. Kohtanen undertook his education as a minister at Stanborough College, now known as Newbold College. in Watford, England from 1909 - 1912.

== Friendship with Arthur S. Maxwell ==
While studying in England, Kohtanen spent his school breaks with the family of Arthur S. Maxwell, who later became well known Christian children's author “Uncle Arthur.” Prior to meeting Kohtanen, Maxwell had not shown any interest in Christianity. Such was his objection that once when a minister had come to give the Maxwell family a Bible study, he had escaped the family home by sliding down a drain-pipe. When Maxwell met Kohtanen, however, his perspective on Christianity totally changed and was described by Maxwell's mother as "complete as that of the Apostle Paul". Kohtanen and Maxwell later became roommates at Stanborough College and they remained friends throughout their lives. In 1933, Maxwell traveled from the US to Finland to attend Kohtanen's first Conference Session as the newly appointed President of the Seventh-day Adventist Church Conference in Finland.

== Personal life ==
Upon completion of his studies in 1912, Kohtanen returned to Finland and married Kirsti Grundström, who came from a wealthy family. The marriage was opposed by her family as they felt as a minister of religion he would not be able to provide for her. Kohtanen was able to prove them wrong and they had one son, Spencer, who died in infancy and one daughter, Mirjam (Sigvartsen) who became a physiotherapist and later moved to Norway. His great-grandson Jan Åge Sigvartsen is an Old Testament and Second Temple Period academic and is author of the popular scholarly exegesis website ExegesisPaper.com.

== See also ==
- Seventh-day Adventist Church
- Seventh-day Adventist theology
- Seventh-day Adventist eschatology
- History of the Seventh-day Adventist Church
- Teachings of Ellen White
- Inspiration of Ellen White
- Prophecy in the Seventh-day Adventist Church
- Investigative judgment
- Pillars of Adventism
- Second Advent
- Baptism by Immersion
- Conditional Immortality
- Historicism
- Three Angels' Messages
- End times
- Sabbath in Seventh-day Adventism
- Ellen G. White
- Adventist
- Seventh-day Adventist Church Pioneers
- Seventh-day Adventist worship
