= Samir Selmanovic =

Croatian-American pastor, author, and life coach

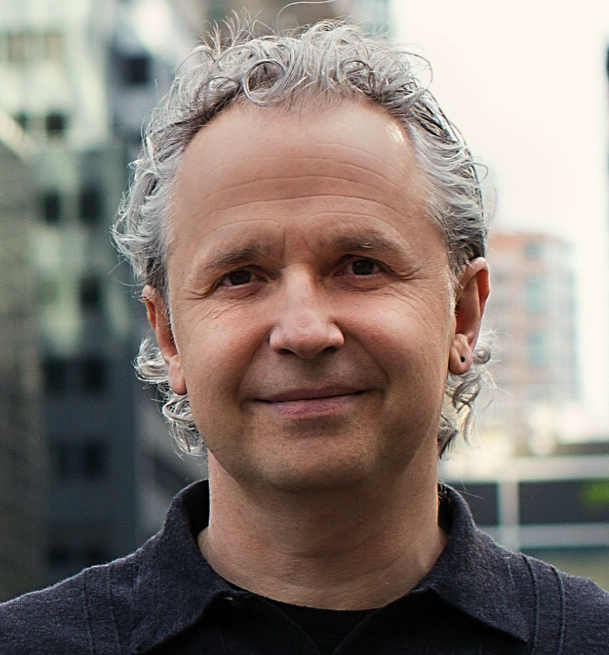
- Samir Selmanovic, c 2015
- Born: 1965 (age 60–61)
- Occupations: Pastor, writer, life coach
- Notable work: It's Really All About God: Reflections of a Muslim Atheist Jewish Christian

Samir Selmanović (born 1965 in Zagreb, Croatia) is an Croatian-born American life coach. He is the author of the book It's Really All About God: Reflections of a Muslim Atheist Jewish Christian.

== Early life and education ==
Selmanovic was born in 1965 in Zagreb, Croatia. He had a Muslim father and a Catholic mother, but was raised in secular Yugoslavia. His father was originally from Montenegro and his mother from Slovenia. Selmanovic was completing his compulsory service in the Yugoslav army, when he converted to Christianity aged 18. Specifically, he became a Seventh Day Adventist. His parents tried for a time to persuade him to give it up.

Selmanovic obtained a bachelor of science in engineering, a master of arts in psychology, a master of divinity, and a Ph.D. in human development after moving to the United States. He studied at Andrews University in Berrien Springs, Michigan.

== Career ==
Selmanovic worked as an alternative theater leader in Europe. After he moved to the United States, he worked as an engineer and pastor.

Selmanovic is a Seventh-day Adventist pastor. In 2002, he was pastor of Church of the Advent Hope in New York City, and facilitated Christian-Muslim discussion in the wake of the September 11, 2001 attacks. In 2007, he founded Faith House Manhattan, an interfaith community where he is and executive director.

Selmanovic later became an executive coach.

Selmanovic is the author of the book It's Really All About God: Reflections of a Muslim Atheist Jewish Christian.

== Critical reception ==
Of his book, It's Really All About God: Reflections of a Muslim Atheist Jewish Christian, Publisher's Weekly said "In his new book,... Selmanovic tells his story of struggles for spiritual definition.... With the passion and warmth of a spiritually secure individual, Selmanovic encourages people of faith to confront both skeptics and hard-liners".

Multicultural Review said "A mixture of memoir and theological reflection, this book considers the future of organised religion... While his book claims to be written for people of any faith, its strong Christian perspective and use of Christian language and imagery may limit its ability to reach a large readership".

The Tennessean similarly said the book "sounds like the ultimate multicultural manifesto" but is "a work of Christian advocacy and Christian humanism".

The New York Times said "Selmanovic is not advocating for a mash-up of faiths [...] But Selmanovic sympathizes with everyone who ever puzzled at Christians 'so bent on denying grace outside the boundaries of Christianity'; and he asks whether boundaries need to be walls.

== Publications ==
- Selmanovic, Samir (17 February 2011). It's Really All About God: How Islam, Atheism, and Judaism Made Me a Better Christian. Jossey-Bass. ISBN 978-0470923412.
- Selmanović, Samir. “The Immigrants’ Journey.” Developing Leaders, no. 46 (March 2025): 138–59.
