= James Alexander Chiles =

American lawyer (1860–1930)

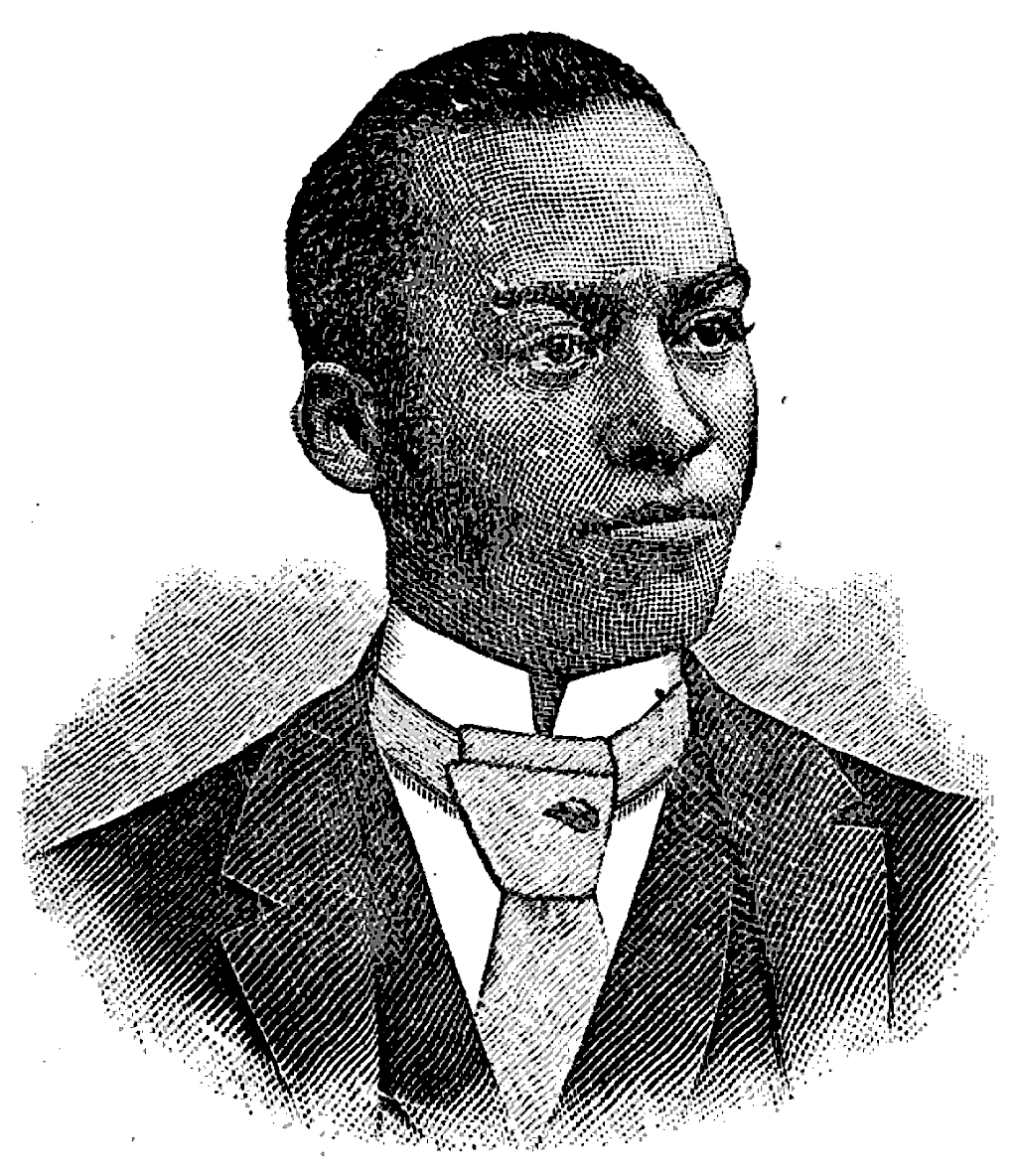
- Born: January 8, 1860; Richmond, Virginia
- Died: April 5, 1930 (aged 70); Richmond, Virginia
- Other name: J. Alexander Chiles
- Education: Lincoln University; University of Michigan
- Occupation: Attorney
- Known for: United States Supreme Court case Chiles v. Chesapeake & O R CO
- Spouse: Fannie J. Bates
- Children: 2

James Alexander Chiles (1860–1930), also known as J. Alexander Chiles, was the first African American lawyer in Lexington, Kentucky. He began his career at the University of Michigan Law School before moving to Lexington to begin his law career. Chiles argued in the United States Supreme Court case Chiles v. Chesapeake & Ohio Railway after being moved from a section of the train reserved from whites only into the colored section, despite having a first class ticket. The case was ultimately dismissed upholding the legality of the Kentucky Separate Coach Law.

== Early life ==
James Alexander Chiles was born on June 8, 1860, in Richmond, Virginia. He has a twin brother named John R. Chiles; and he was one of eight children born to Martha and Richard Chiles.

He began his education at the age of 6 at the Freedmens' School in Richmond Virginia but due to his parents being poor and having a large family to provide for, he and his brothers felt as though they should leave school and work to help provide for the home; which they did. He held various jobs, he first started out working at the tobacco factory, then he got offered a job as a porter in a store, and finally worked at a hotel as a bellboy and a porter. With whatever spare time he got from work, he would utilize his time to study and read to prepare to continue his education one day.

== Education ==
With financial support from his twin brother John, he enrolled in 1882 at Lincoln University in Chester County, Pennsylvania, where he also worked for his board as a dining room waiter. He graduated in 1887.

Chiles enrolled at the University of Michigan Law School. By 1889 he had acquired his law degree and began practicing law in Virginia. This was short lived as the following year he moved to Lexington, Kentucky and established his own law firm there.

== Legal practice ==
Chiles was the first African American lawyer to practice law in Lexington, Kentucky beginning in 1890. By 1907, Chiles was one of four African American Lawyers in Lexington total. He opened a law firm at 304 W. Short Street.

== Chiles v. Chesapeake & Ohio Railway ==
In 1903, Chiles purchased a first class ticket from Washington D.C. to Lexington, Kentucky on the Chesapeake and Ohio Railway (Chesapeake & O R CO). The train did not run all the way from Washington, D.C. to Lexington, first stopping in Ashland, Kentucky. It is here where Chiles entered a car reserved only for whites only. He was asked by the brakesman to go into the colored department of the train, which he declined to do. The conductor then asked Chiles to seat himself in the colored section of the train in accordance with the regulations of the O R CO. He refused on the grounds that he had bought a first class ticket from Washington, D.C to Lexington. He was then forcibly escorted to the colored train car, leading Chiles to challenge this decision as a violation of his Constitutional rights.

The "colored" car was established by Kentucky's Separate Coach Law, which stated that black and white train passengers were to ride in separate train cars in 1892. Chiles had claimed that the Separate Coach Law did not apply to him and his interstate commerce laws were being violated. Taking his case to the Circuit Court of Fayette County, Kentucky, Chiles lost his case and was granted no compensation. It was determined that because of Ashland to Lexington, the state could uphold the Separate Coach Law determining that the cars were equal for both black and white passengers with the same conveniences being provided in each and that Chiles must obey the rules and regulations of the railroad company. He requested a new trial, which was denied. In 1907, Chiles appealed the decision taking it to the Kentucky Court of Appeals and won damages to the amount of $100 because of his seat being moved from first class into the unequal colored train car, escorted by a police officer after protest.

Chiles decided to again challenge the decision he was granted claiming violation of separate but equal laws, claiming he was forced to move to an unequal Jim Crow car. Chiles protested that class, not race, should be the determining factor in the law as he had the economic capacity to ride in first class and purchased himself a ticket. Chiles then took the case to the United States Supreme Court where the case was argued April 18, 1910. On May 10, 1910, the Supreme Court upheld the Kentucky Court of Appeals decision arguing that a state railroad company has the right to establish regulations which required white and black passengers to reside in separate train cars.

== Personal life ==
Chiles was an active member of the African American community. He and his wife were known to be helping the poor and needy. Chiles resisted the Kentucky General Assembly when they discussed passing a bill that discriminated against African American voters in 1904. Chiles lobbied for school truant officers and physicians in African American schools in Lexington Kentucky. In 1913, Chiles was appointed as a delegate to the 50th anniversary observance of the Emancipation Proclamation in Philadelphia by Kentucky Governor James McCreary. Chiles and his wife Fannie J. Bates Chiles were members of the first African-American Seventh-day Adventist Church in Lexington, Kentucky He served as a trustee, deacon and treasurer.

== Death and legacy ==
Chiles died in Richmond, Virginia in April 1930. After Chiles' death, the Lexington Bar Association wrote a tribute in his memory. The tribute was listed in the Lexington Leader newspaper on April 9, 1930, and reads, "Proverbs 22:29 reads, 'Do you see a man skilled in his work? He will stand in the presence of kings. He will not stand in the presence of unknown men.' James Alexander Chiles lived a life that serves as an example to all Americans of what is possible when opportunity, access to resources, and hard work are combined."
