= Leona G. Running =

- Born: Leona Rachel Glidden; August 24, 1916; Flint, Michigan, U.S.
- Died: January 22, 2014 (aged 97); Berrien Springs, Michigan, U.S.
- Occupation: Seventh-day Adventist Theologian

Leona Rachel Glidden Running (August 24, 1916 – January 22, 2014) was the first Seventh-day Adventist woman to earn a Doctor of Philosophy (PhD) in Ancient Near Eastern Studies at Johns Hopkins University. She was also the first female to join the faculty of the Seventh-day Adventist Theological Seminary in 1955 at Takoma Park, Maryland, and later when the Seminary relocated to the campus of Andrews University in Berrien Springs, Michigan.

== Early life and education ==
Running was born on August 24, 1916, in Flint, Michigan. Her father was Charles Comstock Glidden and her mother was Leona Mary Bertha Boat Glidden. From an early age, Running was attracted to learning languages and was encouraged by her mother, who was a teacher. She completed her schooling at Adelphian Academy in Holly, Michigan.

Running undertook a Bachelor of Arts program in modern languages (French, German, and English) from Emmanuel Missionary College and graduated as valedictorian in 1937. She also completed a Master of Arts program in Greek and Hebrew from the Adventist Theological Seminary in 1955. She completed a PhD in Semitic languages from Johns Hopkins University in 1964. In May 2012, Running received an honorary Doctor of Humane Letters from Andrews University.

== Career ==
The Seventh-day Adventist church did not ordain female clergy, and Running began her academic career at a time when few women were accepted in a professional capacity within the Seventh-day Adventist church. Seminary leaders were also skeptical regarding their male students willingness to be taught by a female academic and of Running's ability to relate to male students. She was initially hired on a probationary basis, but within a year was given faculty status and not long after, full tenure.

During her tenure at the Seventh-day Adventist Theological Seminary (1955-2002), she taught Greek, Hebrew, Egyptian, Akkadian, Syriac, and Aramaic. She was also the first female president of the Chicago Society of Biblical Research from 1981 to 1982.

Running also created "The Leona Glidden Running Collection: Women in Church and Society," a collection of published opinions and thought regarding women in the church and in society. The extensive collection contains files regarding current issues of women, including the ordination of women ministers in various denominations, women in athletic and other careers, the influence of economic conditions on women, and the issues of aging, assault and abuse, rape, health, gender roles, and marriage.

== Personal life ==
On May 17, 1942 at age 41, she married Leif Running, who died August 20, 1946 at age 37. On January 22, 2014, Running (97) died in Berrien Springs, Michigan.

== See also ==
- Seventh-day Adventist Church
- Seventh-day Adventist theology
- History of the Seventh-day Adventist Church
- Seventh-day Adventist Church Pioneers
- Seventh-day Adventist worship
