= Winston J. Craig =

American dietitian

- Education: University of Queensland (PhD, 1971); Loma Linda University (MPH, 1975)
- Occupations: Dietitian; writer

Winston J. Craig is an American registered dietitian and nutrition writer. He is Professor Emeritus of Nutrition at Andrews University and Adjunct Professor of Nutrition, School of Public Health at Loma Linda University.

== Career ==
Craig obtained his PhD in chemistry from the University of Queensland in 1971 and a Master of Public Health degree in nutrition from Loma Linda University in 1975. He has been a registered dietitian since 1983. He was Professor of Nutrition and Director of the dietetics internship program at Andrews University and was a faculty member at Loma Linda University.

Craig is a researcher of plant-rich dietary patterns and co-authored the Academy of Nutrition and Dietetics 2009 and 2016 position papers on vegetarian diets. He has authored over 225 nutrition articles and is a member of the American Nutrition Association. Craig was the editor of the book Vegetarian Nutrition and Wellness.

== Personal life ==
Craig is a Seventh-day Adventist and maintains a plant-based diet for health and religious reasons. He is a member of Adventist Health Ministries and has written for the Adventist Review.

== Selected publications ==
- "Health Effects of Vegan Diets". The American Journal of Clinical Nutrition. 89 (5): 1627S–1633S. 2009. doi:10.3945/ajcn.2009.26736N. PMID 19279075.
- "Position of the Academy of Nutrition and Dietetics: Vegetarian Diets" (PDF). Journal of the Academy of Nutrition and Dietetics. 115 (5): 1970–1980. 2016. doi:10.1016/j.jand.2016.09.025. ISSN 2212-2672. PMID 27886704. S2CID 4984228.
- Vegetarian Nutrition and Wellness. CRC Press. 2021. ISBN 978-1032095288.
