= Sunny Liu =

Singing evangelist

Sunny Wing Chun Liu (April 6, 1924 – May 20, 1987) was a Seventh-Day Adventist minister and singing evangelist, who was best known in the denomination through his recordings for Chapel Records.

== Biography ==
=== Early life and career ===
Sunny Liu was born to Violet Liu in Kealia, Hawaii and raised in Honolulu, Hawaii. His primary and secondary education took place in Hawaii. He left Hawaii in 1943 to study voice on the mainland of the United States, largely in the Hollywood area. He earned a college degree from Walla Walla College in 1948 and became a credentialed Seventh-Day Adventist minister. From 1949 until 1957 he held a position in musical evangelism for the North Pacific Union Conference of Seventh-Day Adventists. 1951 saw him married to Bernice Lee, with whom he had two sons. His touring prior to 1952 included concerts in Hawaii, Oregon, Washington, the Hollywood Bowl (1950) and San Francisco in California, and appearances in Canada. He was ordained as a minister in 1954.

=== Pastoral period ===
By mid-1958 he had moved to Jamaica, Queens for denominational work in New York City. He would later hold pastoral positions in Albany, Elmira, and Troy in New York State. He was back in the Pacific Northwest in 1965, serving as a pastor in the Portland, Oregon area for twenty-two years, but also involved in Voice of Prophecy evangelism and the 1966 General Conference Session.

== Death ==
Liu died on May 20, 1987, having suffered from cancer for an extended period.

== Style ==
Liu was a dramatic tenor. His early concerts concentrated on Irish romantic ballads. As a pastor, his sermons typically included at least one segment of singing. He recorded several albums for Chapel Records in the sacred style, and by that label's criteria became one of their best-selling artists. Through these recordings and his appearances in Adventist media he became widely known throughout Adventism.

== Discography ==
"Prayer Perfect" (10-inch LP) - Chapel 1205 (pre-June 1955)

- Prayer Perfect
- Follow, I Will Follow Thee
- Deep Down In My Heart
- Holy, Holy Is What The Angels Sing
- My Testament
- Saved By Grace
- The Lord's Prayer
- An Evening Prayer

"The Holy City" (10-inch LP) - Chapel 1243 (pre-June 1955)

- The Holy City
- Now I Belong to Jesus
- It's In My Heart
- Are You Ready For Jesus to Come
- (four unknown tracks)

"The Beautiful Land" (12-inch LP) - Chapel 5029 (February 1960)

- There's a Beautiful Land on High (Taylor)
- He's Coming to Take Me Up There (Rees)
- I Want to See Heaven (Rees)
- O The Way Is Long and Weary (Root)
- If I Gained the World (Swedish)
- Beautiful Valley of Eden (Sherwin)
- I'd Rather Have Jesus (Shea - Soderstrom)
- My Prayer (Rees)
- The Love of My Lord (Rees)
- Like Jesus (Miller)
- Never Forgotten (Ackley)
- He Is Calling

"Sunny Liu Sings" (12-inch LP) - Chapel 5071

- There'll Be a Day (Mel Rees)
- He May Never Call Again (Mel Rees)
- I'll Never Be Alone (Mel Rees)
- How Great Thou Art (S. Hine)
- Just a Closer Walk
- The Holy City (S. Adams)
- The Hiding Place (M. Rose)
- God Whispered to Me (Mel Rees)
- We'll Talk It Over (I. Stamphill)

"How Big Is God" (12-inch LP) - Chapel 5094 (monophonic), ST-094 (stereophonic) (1966)

- How Big Is God (Hamblen)
- At The End of The Road (Ackley)
- Follow Me (Tavey)
- Surely Goodness and Mercy (Peterson / Smith)
- For All My Sins (Clayton)
- Ten Thousand Angels (Overholt)
- An Evening Prayer (Gabriel)
- The Great Judgement Morning (Pickett)
- I Need Thee Every Hour (Lowry / Hawks)
- Until Then (Hamblen)

"Songs By Mel Rees" (12-inch LP) - Chapel 5131

- My Troubled Heart
- When You Look Upon A Lovely Flower
- When He Comes
- Little Lamb
- Oh What A Price He Paid For Me
- As Long As He Loves Me
- My Jesus
- Oh, Wonder Of Wonders
- I Don't Know Why

"The Lord Is My Shepherd" (12-inch LP) - Chapel 5182

- The Lord Is My Shepherd
- The Living God
- Forward To Christ
- I'll Be A Friend Of His
- Without Him
- He Touched Me
- Where Will You Be
- He Washed My Eyes With Tears
- A Heart Like Thine

"The Best of Sunny Liu" (12-inch LP, Cassette) - Chapel 5468 (1984)

- How Great Thou Art
- Just A Closer Walk
- How Big Is God
- Until Then
- Ten Thousand Angels
- As Long As He Loves Me
- When He Comes
- He Touched Me
- He Washed My Eyes With Tears
- Without Him
