= James D. Standish =

Australian-American lawyer, diplomat, and writer

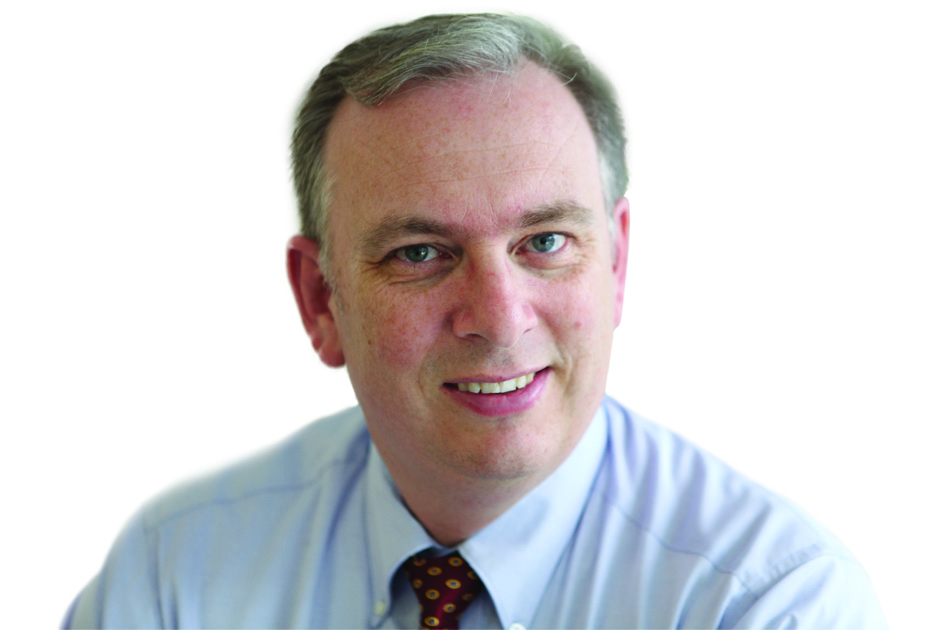
James D. Standish

James D. Standish is an Australian-American lawyer, newspaper editor, diplomat and writer who has served as an official representative of the Church of Seventh-day Adventists to the United Nations and the US Government. Standish holds both Australian and US citizenships.

Standish has been a legal advocate for religious freedom in the United States and internationally.

Until May 2016, Standish was the communications director for the South Pacific Division of Seventh-day Adventists, as well as head of news and editorial for its news magazine, the Adventist Record.

== Early life ==
Standish was born in Australia. While growing up in Melbourne, he sold newspapers while in the fifth grade on a street corner. His family moved to Thailand when he was a teenager. At age 15, Standish was teaching English to Laotian refugees living in Eastern Thailand.

== Education ==
Standish received his Juris Doctor, cum laude, from Georgetown University where he was president of the Georgetown University Church-State Law Forum and an editor of the Georgetown Journal on Poverty Law & Policy.

Standish received an MBA from the Darden Graduate School of Business at the University of Virginia where he was news editor of the Darden News.

Standish also holds a BBA from Newbold College of Higher Education, England, where he was editor of the college newspaper and then served as president of the student association.

== Career ==
In the 1990s Standish served as the Adventist Church's representative to the US Government in Washington DC, and the United Nations in New York and Geneva. From 2001 to 2008 he was Director of Legislative Affairs for the Seventh-day Adventist Church World Headquarters. From 2008 to 2009, he served as executive director for the United States Commission on International Religious Freedom.

In 2008, Standish was a member of the US delegation to the Organization for Security & Cooperation in Warsaw. During this period, he held US Diplomatic Passport.

In 2009, Standish returned to his previous position on the United States Commission on International Religious Freedom. Also in 2009, he became Deputy Secretary General of the International Religious Liberty Association. He also joined President Barack Obama's Task Force on Interfaith Dialogue & Cooperation.

In 2010, Standish became the Secretary of the United Nations NGO Committee on Freedom of Religion or Belief.

As a representative of the Adventist Church, Standish has met with President George W. Bush, Senator John McCain, Senator John Kerry, Secretary of State Hillary Clinton, the Governor General of Papua New Guinea, Members of both the British House of Lords and House of Commons and the Prime Minister of Australia.

Standish's more recent position was Communication Director for the South Pacific Division of the Adventist Church.

== Awards ==
- Received the Sikh American Legal Defense and Education Fund civil rights award, 2008
- Awarded the International Religious Liberty Association's plaque for outstanding service, 2008

== Bar memberships ==
- Admitted to practice before the US Supreme Court
- Admitted to practice before the US Fourth Circuit Court of Appeals
- Member of the District of Columbia Bar Association
- Member of the Virginia State Bar

== Personal life ==
Standish is married and has three children.

== Publications ==
From 2009 to 2010, Standish wrote a column on the Newsweek/Washington Post's 'On Faith' site. He has authored articles for the ABA Journal and the National Law Journal. Standish has also written articles for Liberty magazine.

As editor of RECORD, the official news magazine of the Seventh-day Adventist Church, he wrote regular editorials and features.
