= David Trim =

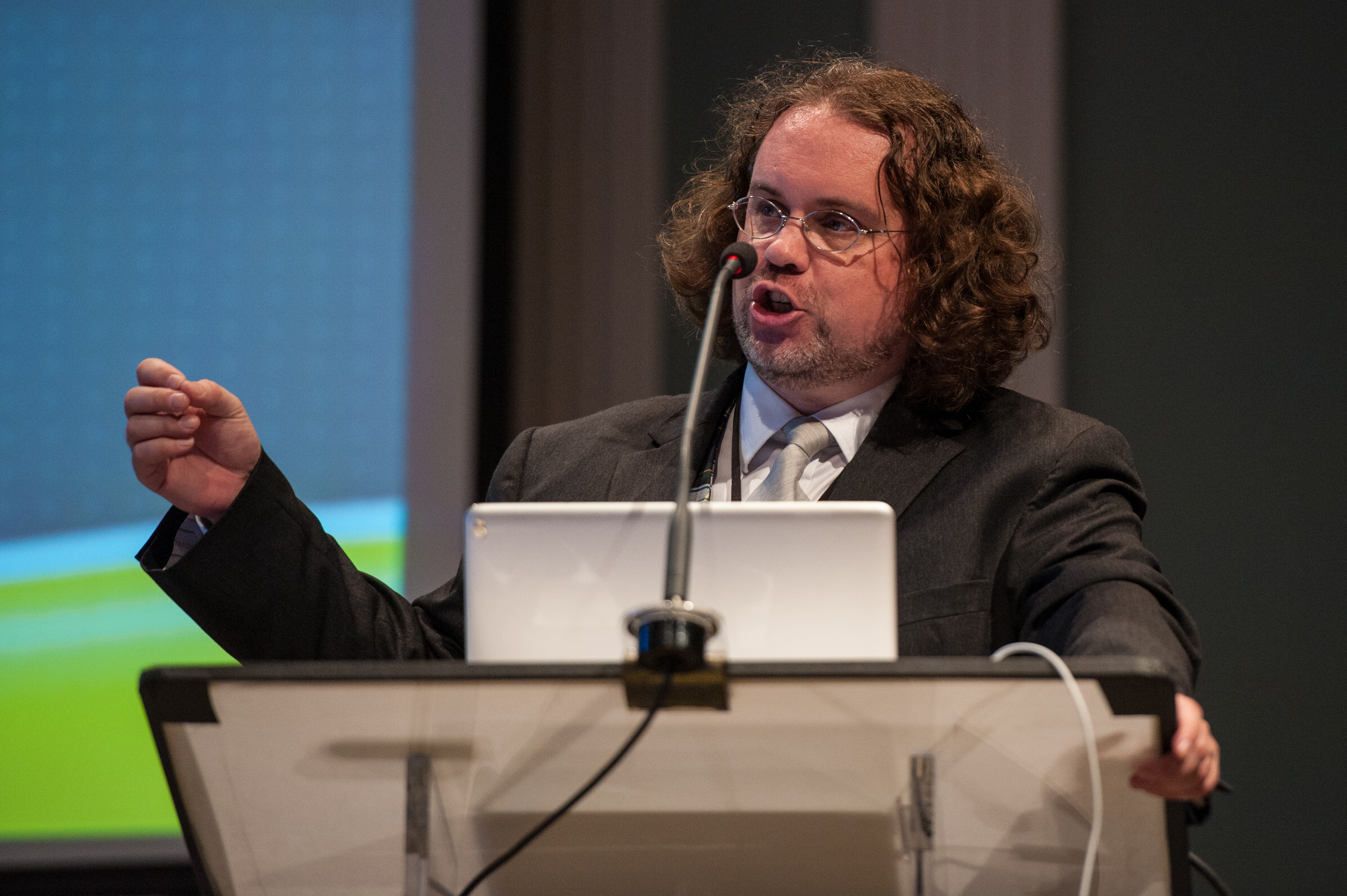
- Born: 1969 (age 56–57); Bombay, India
- Occupations: Historian; archivist; educator

Academic background
- Education: King's College London

Academic work
- Discipline: European military and religious history
- Institutions: Pacific Union College

David J.B. Trim is a historian, archivist, and educator whose specialties are in European military history and religious history. Currently, he is the director of Archives, Statistics, and Research at the World Headquarters of Seventh-day Adventists.

== Background ==
Trim was born in Bombay, India, in 1969 to British and Australian parents and raised largely in Sydney, Australia. Educated in Britain, he has a BA in history from Newbold College and a PhD in War Studies and History is from King's College, London, part of the University of London.

== Career ==
Trim taught for ten years at Newbold College and for two years held the Walter C. Utt Chair in History at Pacific Union College. In late 2010 he was appointed Archivist of the Seventh-day Adventist Church and in 2011 became its global Director of Research. He has held research fellowships at the Huntington Library and the Folger Shakespeare Library, and been a visiting scholar at the University of California at Berkeley and the University of Reading in the United Kingdom. Trim has been a Fellow of the Royal Historical Society since 2003.

== Scholarship ==
Trim is the author, editor, or co-editor of eighteen volumes, including: The Chivalric Ethos and the Development of Military Professionalism (Brill, 2003), Amphibious Warfare 1000-1700: Commerce, State Formation and European Expansion (Brill, 2006), European Warfare 1350-1750 (Cambridge University Press, 2010), Humanitarian Intervention: A History (Cambridge University Press, 2011) and Harfleur to Hamburg (Oxford University Press, 2024).

Trim's scholarship is credited with making important contributions to several academic areas. His work on humanitarian intervention demonstrated that nations historically engaged in this strategy to limit or arrest human suffering; it is credited with being a significant intervention in the debate about humanitarian intervention, demonstrating that it has long-term historical roots.

== Bibliography ==
- Co-editor, with Brendan Simms, Harfleur to Hamburg. New York: Oxford University Press, 2024.
- Walter Utt: Adventist historian. Silver Spring, MD: Office of Archives, Statistics, and Research, 2023.
- Hearts of faith: How we became Seventh-day Adventists. Nampa, ID: Pacific Press, 2022.
- Co-editor, with A.L. Chism and M.F. Younker, Adventist Mission in China in Historical Perspective, General Conference Archives Monographs, 2. Silver Spring, MD: Office of Archives, Statistics, and Research, 2022.
- We aim at nothing less than the whole world’: The Seventh-day Adventist Church’s missionary enterprise and the General Conference Secretariat, 1863–2019. Silver Spring, MD: Office of Archives, Statistics, and Research, 2021.
- A Passion for Mission: The Trans-European Division after Ninety Years. Bracknell, UK: Newbold Academic Press, 2019.
- A Living Sacrifice: Unsung Heroes of Adventist Missions. Pacific Press, 2019.
- Co-editor, with Yvonne M. Terry-McElrath, Curis J. VanderWaal, and Alina J. Baltazar, Promoting the public good: Policy in the public square and the Church. Cooranbong, NSW, Australia: Avondale Academic Press, 2018.
- Co-editor, with Benjamin J. Baker, Fundamental Belief 6: Creation. Silver Spring, MD: Office of Archives, Statistics, and Research, 2014.
- Editor, The Huguenots: History and Memory in Transnational Context. Leiden & Boston: Brill, 2011.
- Co-editor, with Brendan Simms, Humanitarian Intervention—A History. Cambridge: Cambridge University Press, 2011; South Asian edn, 2011; paperback edn, 2013.
- Co-editor, with Frank Tallett, European Warfare, 1350–1750. Cambridge: Cambridge University Press, 2010.
- Co-editor, with Daniel Heinz, Pluralism, Parochialism and Contextualization: Challenges to Adventist Mission in Europe. Oxford, Bern, Berlin, Brussels, Frankfurt am Main, New York & Vienna: Peter Lang, 2010.
- Co-editor, with Richard Bonney, The Development of Pluralism in Modern Britain and France. Oxford, Bern, Berlin, Brussels, Frankfurt am Main, New York & Vienna: Peter Lang, 2007.
- Co-editor, with Richard Bonney, Persecution and Pluralism: Calvinists and Religious Minorities in Early-Modern Europe, 1550-1700. Oxford, Bern, Berlin, Brussels, Frankfurt am Main, New York & Vienna: Peter Lang, 2006.
- Co-editor, with Mark Charles Fissel, Amphibious Warfare 1000-1700: Commerce, State Formation and European Expansion. Leiden & Boston: Brill, 2006; paperback edn, 2011.
- Co-editor, with Peter J. Balderstone, Cross, Crown and Community: Religion, Government and Culture in Early Modern England, 1400–1800. Oxford, Bern & New York: Peter Lang, 2004.
- Editor, The Chivalric Ethos and the Development of Military Professionalism. Leiden & Boston: Brill, 2003.

== Editorships ==
- Founder and co-editor, monograph series "Warfare, Society and Culture," Routledge (originally Pickering & Chatto), August 2007–present.
- Associate editor, Journal of the Society for Army Historical Research (founded 1921) Jan. 2002–2010.
- Consultant associate editor, Oxford Dictionary of National Biography (2004), for "Tudor army."
