= Antoinette Hertsenberg =

Dutch television presenter (born 1964)

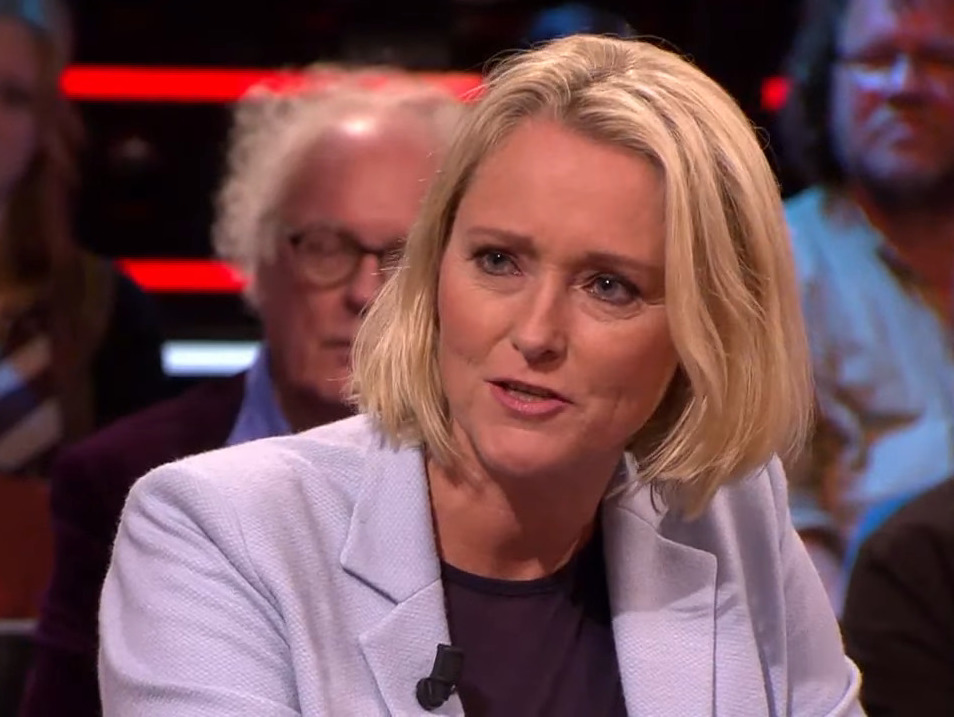
- Antoinette Hertsenberg (2017)
- Born: 28 December 1964 (age 60); The Hague, Netherlands
- Occupation: Television presenter
- Known for: Radar; Opgelicht?!

Antoinette Hertsenberg (born 28 December 1964) is a Dutch television presenter. She is known for presenting the Dutch consumer television show Radar for more than 25 years. She also presented Opgelicht?! for over sixteen years.

== Career ==
Since 1995, Hertsenberg presents the consumer television show Radar. In the show, she looks at issues related to products and services by companies and organizations. Fons Hendriks is a co-presenter of the show since 2017.

Hertsenberg presented the television show Dokters van Morgen on the topic of innovations in health care. She also presented the show Medische Detectives, in which people with an undiagnosed condition can tell their story and describe their symptoms in the hope that a viewer may know something that can help with diagnosis.

Hertsenberg appeared as witch in a 2011 episode of De TV Kantine. She was the procession reporter in the 2012 edition of The Passion, a Dutch Passion Play held every Maundy Thursday since 2011.

In May 2022, she won the Media Oeuvre Award.

Hertsenberg won the 2024 season of the photography television show Het Perfecte Plaatje in which contestants compete to create the best photo in various challenges.

== Personal life ==
Hertsenberg was born in 1964 in The Hague, Netherlands. She moved to Apeldoorn at a very young age. She was raised in the Roman Catholic Church, and at 16, she stopped attending.

Hertsenberg is married to Dutch politician and animal rights activist Niko Koffeman. She is a member of the Seventh-day Adventist Church and has three children with her husband.
