= Archibald W. Truman =

American physician and Seventh-day Adventist

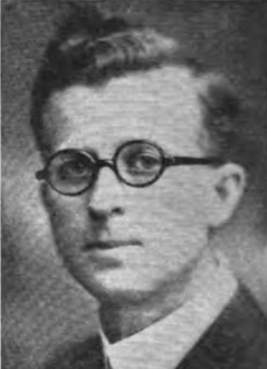
- Born: 13 March 1884; Mulvane, Kansas
- Died: 20 April 1977 (aged 93); Loma Linda, California
- Occupation: Physician

Archibald William Truman (13 March 1884 – 20 April 1977) was an American physician, Seventh-day Adventist and vegetarianism activist.

Truman was born in Mulvane, Kansas, he had 11 siblings. Truman was educated at Keene Industrial Academy and Battle Creek College, 1900–1904. He graduated in medicine at the University of Colorado in 1908. He married Daisy Ethel Nary a nurse in September 1908 and they had five children. His cousin was President Harry S. Truman. Truman advocated lacto-ovo vegetarianism, he authored Ten Reasons for a Fleshless Diet, in 1917.

Truman was a faculty member at the College of Medical Evangelists for the first decade of the college's history, 1909–1919 and was a physician and medical director at sanatoriums in Canada, China, and the United States. From 1911, he taught physiology at Loma Linda University. He was medical director of Glendale Sanitarium in southern California during 1923–1924 and 1941–1946. He served as General Conference medical secretary for 14 years until 1936.

He was the editor of Life and Health magazine, 1933–1935. He served as General Conference medical secretary 1922–1923 and 1928–1936 and was medical secretary of the China division, 1939–1941. Truman died on 20 April 1977 at the age of 93.

== Selected publications ==
- Ten Reasons for a Fleshless Diet (1917)
- Cancer, the Chief Hazard of Living (1931)
- Diet, Health, Character, Destiny (1936)
