= Roger Morneau =

Canadian writer (1925–1998)

Roger J. Morneau (18 April 1925 – 22 September 1998) was a Christian author who wrote on prayer and the supernatural. He was a member of the Seventh-day Adventist Church.

== Biography ==
Morneau was born in 1925 in Saint-Jacques, New Brunswick, Canada, into a family of devout French Canadian Catholics; two of his aunts were nuns, and one uncle was a priest. While he was a youth, his mother died and he experienced disillusionment in God that he later claimed stemmed from teachings in Catholic books and the Church. He claimed to have been concerned with teaching that there is no salvation outside the Catholic Church, and felt he could not understand a God that would torture people eternally in hell.

Morneau claimed that as a young adult he was introduced to spiritism through a friend, and nearly joined a secret order of spirit worshipers who claimed to be the "elite". Before he was to make a full commitment, however, he asked a Seventh-day Adventist co-worker, Cyril Grossé, to go over some Bible studies with him. This turned him away from spiritism and began his studies of Christ as an Adventist. Morneau claims there was the threat of a bounty on his head of $10,000 (approximately $126,000 in 2012 dollars), should he join the Adventist Church. He became a member of the Adventist Church in 1946 regardless. In 1947, he married Hilda, a licensed vocational nurse in Montreal, after which he worked for many years in telephone advertising sales. In 1984, an illness destroyed part of his heart muscle, giving him cardiomyopathy for the rest of his life. Morneau died in 1998.

Film production company Lifestreams Media researched and produced a feature-length documentary titled "Charmed by Darkness" about Roger Morneau's life which includes previously unseen pictures, documents and footage, confirming Roger's childhood and World War II experiences as told in the full manuscript of his autobiography "Charmed by Darkness" (an abridged version was originally published in 1982 as "A Trip into the Supernatural"). The film includes interviews with eye witnesses Cyril and Cynthia Grossé who studied the Bible with Roger in 1946 and later became lifelong friends. The last half of the film documents the size and impact of Roger's international prayer ministry that included over 25,000 names on his prayer list prior to his death in 1998.

== Publications ==
- A Trip Into the Supernatural
- Beware of angels: Deceptions in the last days, Review and Herald Pub, 1997, ISBN 978-0828013000
- Incredible Answers to Prayer trilogy
  - Incredible Answers to Prayer: How God Intervened When One Man Prayed, Review & Herald Publishing, 1990, ISBN 978-0828005302
  - More Incredible Answers to Prayer, (1993)
  - When You Need Incredible Answers to Prayer, Adventist Book Center New Jersey, 1995, ISBN 978-0828009768
- The Incredible Power of Prayer, Review & Herald Publishing, (June 1, 1997), ISBN 978-0828013291
- Charmed By Darkness, Pacific Press, 2015, ISBN 978-0816357697
