= Norman Maphosa =

Zimbabwean academic

Norman Maphosa (born August 19, 1949) served as the Vice-Chancellor of Solusi University, a Seventh-day Adventist university located in Zimbabwe from early 1992 to 2011. He managed the university at a time when the Zimbabwean economy was at its apex, and also during its precarious nadir.

== Biography ==
Maphosa is highly regarded as a philanthropist who has gathered support from the likes of Grace Mugabe. He has participated in the Commission on Higher Education of the denomination's worldwide body.

Maphosa is also father, former widower, poet, scholar, and lover of the English language. He released an e-book anthology titled Mystery and Mystique of the VICTORIA FALLS: (Mosi-oa-Tunya) Kindle Edition in August 2016.

Maphosa was appointed by David Coltart as board chairman of Zimsec, which he held until he was replaced by University of Zimbabwe Vice Chancellor, Levi Nyagura.

Since 2014, Maphosa has been serving as the Director General of ZIPAM.
