= Rose May Alaba =

Austrian singer, songwriter and recording artist

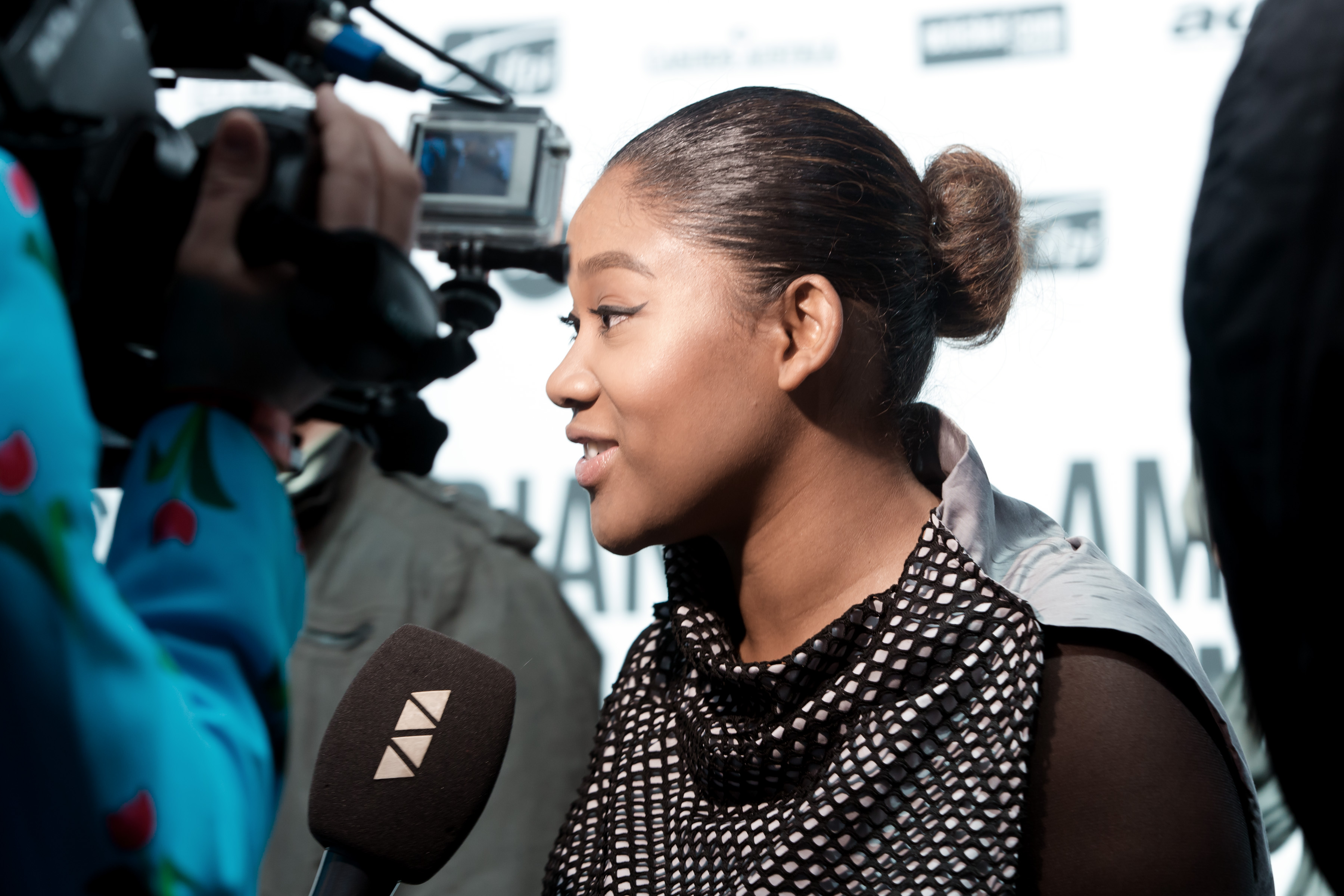
- Rose May Alaba at the Amadeus Austrian Music Awards in 2015
- Born: Rose May Alaba; 26 May 1994 (age 32); Vienna, Austria
- Occupations: singer, songwriter, recording artist
- Years active: 2015 – present

Rose May Alaba (born 26 May 1994) is an Austrian singer, songwriter and recording artist. She is best known for her 2016 single, Love Me Right, which peaked at number 1 on the Austrian iTunes chart for over four weeks. She represented Austria at the 2017 Europa Music Contest and performed the theme song for the 2017 Special Olympics World Winter Games, which was held in Austria.

== Early life ==
Alaba was born in Vienna, Austria to a Filipino mother and a Nigerian father. Her brother is the Austrian footballer David Alaba. Her father George was a recording artist and disk jockey, known by the stage name Inferno, who enjoyed some success in the late 1990s as a part of the pop-dance duo Two in One. He worked with a record Label in Lagos, Nigeria before he relocated to Austria in 1984.

Alaba began her musical education early, as her parents enrolled her in piano lessons at the age of eight, after they discovered her interest and talent in music when she was six. She later learned to play the guitar by herself, studying tutorials on YouTube. In 2011 she became a member of the girl group BFF, which was put together in the casting show Popstars - Mission Austria and broke up in 2013. In 2014 she completed a three-year course at the film Academy in Vienna.

== Career ==
In 2015, Alaba released her debut single All of This is You, which peaked at number 16, on the Austrian Singles Top 40 charts. However, in 2016, the release of her single Love Me Right, produced by Rodney Hunter, enjoyed appreciable success and peaked at number 1 on the Austrian iTunes chart for over four weeks, earning her an appearance at the Amadeus Austrian Music Award.

In 2017, she was approached by Coca-Cola to pen the theme song for the 2017 Special Olympics World Winter Games, titled Can You Feel It. She performed the song at the opening ceremony, which held in Vienna, Austria.

In the later months of 2017, Alaba began work on a new project, she worked with German songwriter Menno Reyntjes and together they wrote the song Take Your Time, which was produced by Boris Fleck. Alaba began connecting with her Nigerian heritage in 2017, during a visit to Nigeria, she took an interest in the pervading afrobeats genre, which inspired the production of another single My Love (Sabi O), which fused pop and afrobeats influences. The Adrian Louis and Sovida Beatz produced song enjoyed massive airplay on Nigerian radio stations. She then went on to collaborate with Nigerian afrobeats artiste Mayorkun on the song 50/50, which went on to top the Nigerian iTunes Charts.

== Personal life ==
Alaba is a member of the Seventh-day Adventist Church.

== Discography ==
- My Lover (Sabi o)
- Love me right
- All Of This Is You
- Take Your Time
- Can You Feel It
- 50/50 (featuring) Mayorkun
- Go Down Low (prod. by Young John)
- Lemonade
- Ibadi
