= Solusi University =

Coeducational private university in Bulawayo, Zimbabwe

Coordinates: 20.200599°S 28.157816°E

- Former name: Solusi College (1894–1990)
- Motto: 'We serve'
- Type: Private
- Established: 1894
- Affiliations: Seventh-day Adventist Church
- Location: Bulawayo, Zimbabwe
- Campus: Rural, 12,000 acres (49 km^{2})
- Colors: Burnt orange and white
- Website: solusi.ac.zw

Solusi University is a coeducational private university in Bulawayo, Zimbabwe.

Initially established in 1894, the institution received the authorization of the Government of the Republic of Zimbabwe through an act of Parliament to operate as a university in 1994. As a university it first opened on 4 October 1994, the first private institution of higher education in the country. Following the granting of the charter by the Government it was renamed Solusi University. The university follows American grading and business, research, and liberal arts curricular patterns. It is owned and run by the Seventh-day Adventist Church and is part of the Seventh-day Adventist education system, the world's second largest Christian school system.

== History ==
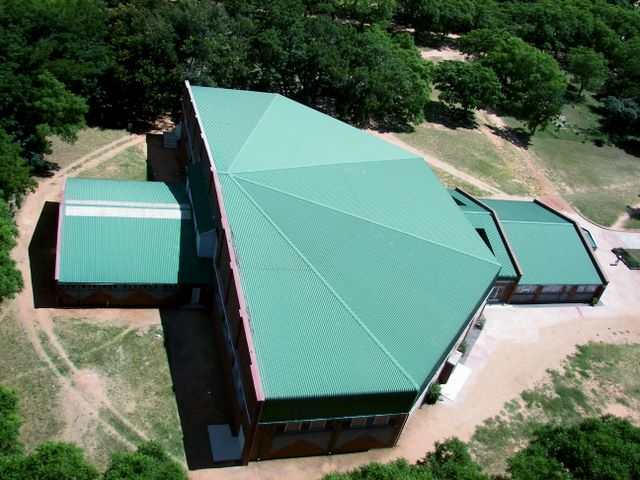
Beit Hall

Solusi Mission was the first Seventh-day Adventist mission station in Africa. It was founded in 1894 on 12,000 acres of land given by Cecil Rhodes, prime minister of Cape Colony, to Pieter Wessels and Asa T. Robinson. On October 31, 1956, the board of regents of the General Conference of Seventh-day Adventists approved Solusi Mission Training School to become a college. In 1958, Solusi College was giving bachelor's degrees to church workers throughout southern and central Africa to meet the needs of a growing church membership. Later on negotiations were made to receive affiliation with a Seventh-day Adventist university in the United States. In October 1984 Solusi College became affiliated with Andrews University. During the 10 years of affiliation with Andrews University, Solusi College grew rapidly. New courses were added and enrollment increased by 500%. In 1991 Solusi College submitted an application to become a private university. In March 1992 the National Council visited Solusi College. In July 1994, a charter established Solusi University. On May 4, 1995, His Excellency, Cde Robert Gabriel Mugabe, gave the Solusi University Charter to chancellor, Dr I. D. Raelly. His Excellency became the first graduate as recipient of the honorary degree of Doctor of Laws. With the establishment of Solusi University, granting of Andrews University degrees became obsolete in August 1998.

== Notable alumni ==
- Levi Nyagura, former vice-chancellor of University of Zimbabwe

== Notable faculty ==
- Norman Maphosa, former Vice-Chancellor of Solusi University
- Joel Musvosvi, 2012 to 2017 Vice-Chancellor of Solusi University
- Ephraim Gwebu, 2018 to 2022 Vice-Chancellor of Solusi University

- Khumbulani Mpofu, 2024 to current Vice-Chancellor of Solusi University

== See also ==
- List of Seventh-day Adventist colleges and universities
- Seventh-day Adventist education
