= Helderberg College of Higher Education =

Seventh-day Adventist College in South Africa

- Motto: Alus Prodesse Discimus
- Motto in English: We learn to serve others
- Type: Private University
- Established: 1893
- President: Tankiso Letseli
- Location: Somerset West, Western Cape, South Africa; 34°3′0″S 18°50′35″E
- Website: https://www.hche.ac.za

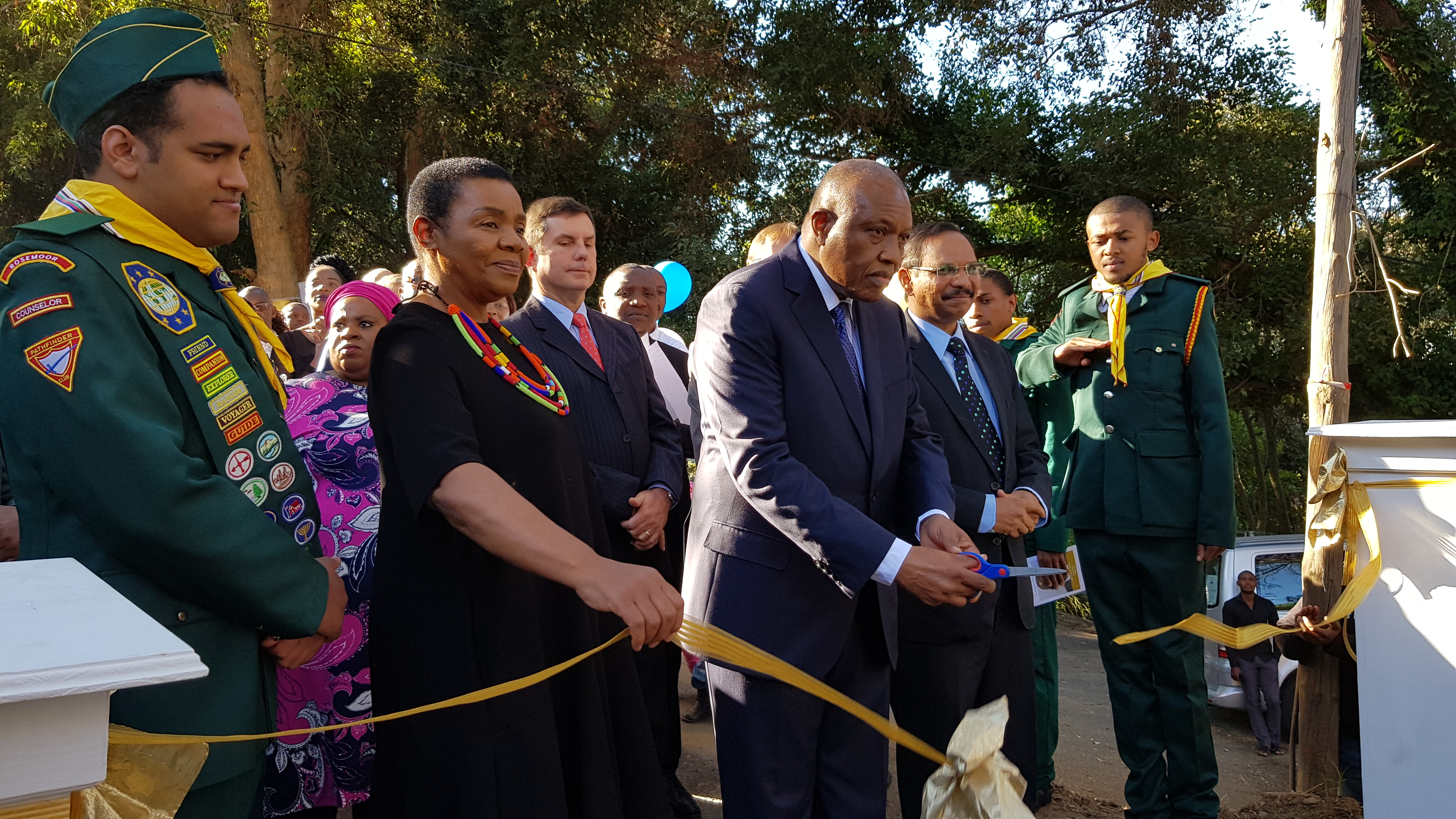
Dr Irvin Khoza, Chairman of South African Premier Soccer League Inaugurates the new road, Dr Irvin Khoza Crescent, at Helderberg College of Higher Education campus on 17 May 2019.

Helderberg College of Higher Education is a private higher education institution situated in Somerset West, South Africa, about thirty minutes from Cape Town. It was established in 1893, and was the first Seventh-day Adventist College established outside of North America under the name "Union College." It moved to its present location in 1928, making it the oldest Adventist college on the continent of Africa. It is owned and operated by the Southern Africa Union Conference of Seventh-day Adventists, with headquarters in Bloemfontein, South Africa.

It is a part of the Seventh-day Adventist education system, the world's second largest Christian school system.

The college also hosts a local research centre of the Ellen G. White Estate.

Helderberg College amended their name to reflect it as a Higher Education institution. The amendment Helderberg College of Higher Education was approved and became effective 9 November 2017. The College also adopted the HCHE abbreviation, and now uses the HCHE.AC.ZA domain as its official domain name.

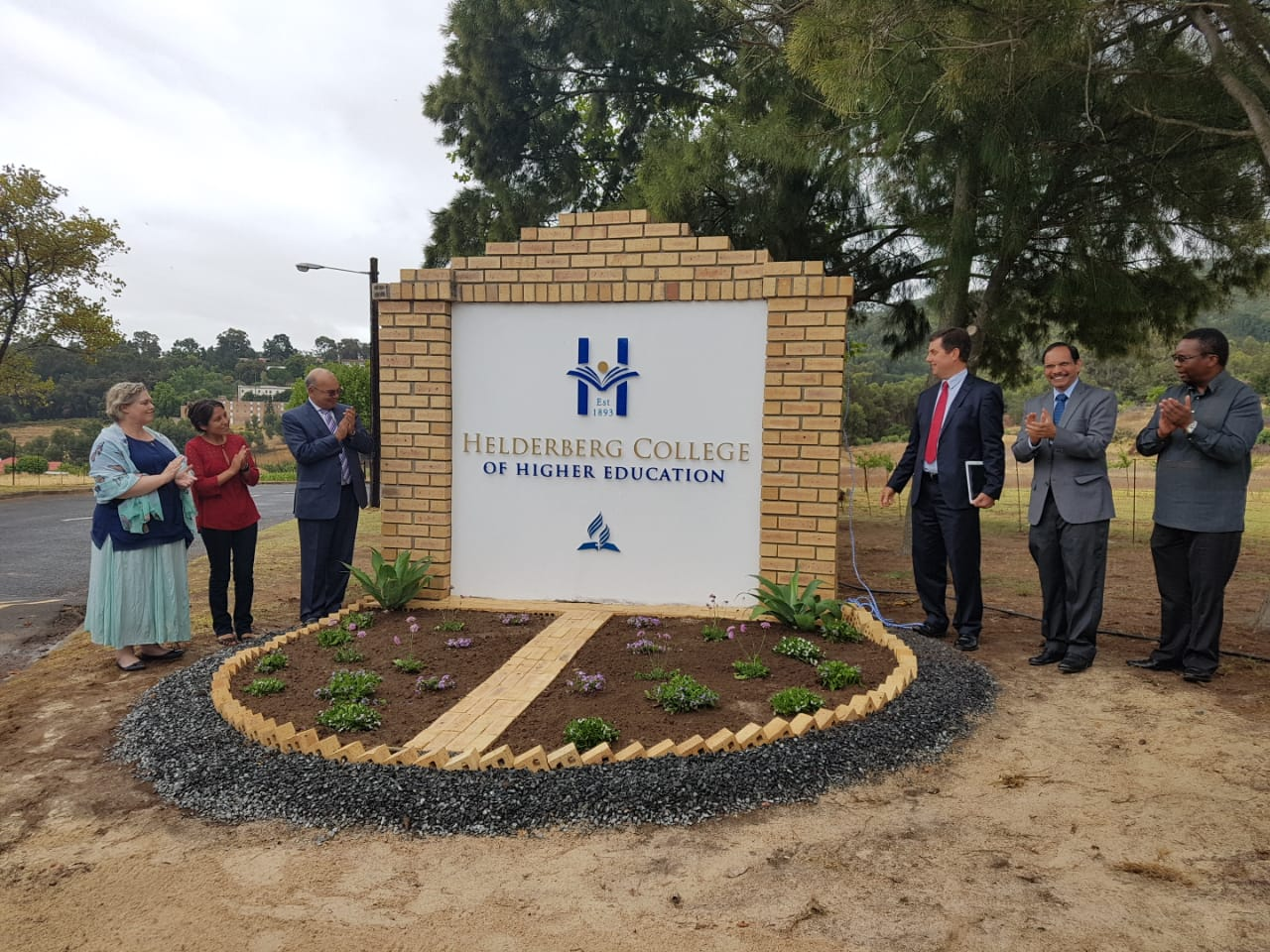
"Helderberg College" name changed to "Helderberg College of Higher Education."

== Historical Overview ==
The history of Seventh-day Adventist education in South Africa began in 1893 with the establishment of Claremont Union College, Cape Town. The College changed locations in 1919 and again in 1928 in an attempt to follow more closely the philosophy that has motivated this institution. After the first move, the College became known as Spion Kop College, and in 1928 the last move established Helderberg College, on the slopes of Helderberg Mountain, just outside Somerset West, South Africa.

=== Claremont Union College (1893-1917) ===
The first Seventh-day Adventist College outside North America, Claremont Union College opened its doors on 1 February 1893. It was situated on 23 acres (93,000 m^{2}) of land within walking distance of Kenilworth station. The impressive buildings and comprehensive curriculum are testimony to the vision of those early educators. The original stately double-storey college building has since been proclaimed a national monument and is today the focal building in a modern shopping complex.

Union College offered primary, secondary and tertiary education. College subjects included Greek and Latin, Trigonometry and Geometry, Chemistry and Physics, Logic and Moral Science. Besides the classical academic education, emphasis was placed on character development, a vocational programme, laws of health, physical training and culture. The College was open to all races and no distinction was made with regard to religious affiliation. In fact, half the students were not Seventh-day Adventists.

Over the 25 years of its existence, two distinct education points of view have waxed and waned with regard to curriculum. The ultimate goal was the same and that was to graduate students who were well prepared for life's tasks. The initial view favoured a strong four-year classical education such as was taught at other notable colleges and academies. With the passage of time, the emphasis swung to the offering of a shorter, more practical course. Despite academic polemics and financial problems compounded by the Anglo-Boer War, the College filled a vital role in providing a religious atmosphere with values that rang true for the 50-100 young people who studied there each year. It graduated 31 students, and many of these have been signally influential in both church and society.

=== South African Training College (1919-1922) ===
The site for Claremont Union College had been chosen because of the strong conviction that a secluded, rural location was most conducive to true education, but by 1917 sprawling urban growth posed a threat. Consequently, the College was relocated on a mission station 20 miles (32 km) from Ladysmith, Natal, and 1918 was spent in erecting buildings, largely from materials salvaged from Union College. Staff and students transferred to the new site and classes began in 1919 with an enrolment of 27. Standards 5-8 were taught, along with a Worker's Course for those preparing for church work. As the College grew, a strong practical emphasis in the curriculum emerged. Two three-year courses, a Training Course and Normal Course, were developed.

When the college was advanced to the status of a junior college, major changes in academic offerings included the introduction of a one-year course in Shorthand, a two-year Normal Course (teacher training programme), and a four-year course resembling the classical course originally offered at Union College. The latter did not get much support and by 1923 all courses were two years in length: the Theological Course, Bible Workers' Course, Teacher Training Course and Commercial Course.

=== Spion Kop College (1922-1927) ===
The emphasis between the two colleges differed: the majority of the 31 graduates from Union College were teachers, while from Spion Kop the majority of the 30 graduates were from the Theology and Bible Workers' courses.

It soon became evident that the remote location and inaccessibility of Spion Kop College were insurmountable obstacles and in 1925 a committee was appointed to select a new location. After looking at 50 farms in the Western Cape, the committee unanimously chose Bakkerskloof with its flourishing almond and apricot orchards flanking Helderberg mountain. They purchased the 370 acres (1.5 km^{2}) for ten thousand pounds, and the third phase of college development began.

=== Helderberg College (1928- ) ===
As it was first called, the new African Missionary College opened in 1928 with two dormitories completed and plans for the construction of the administration building well underway. Apart from these, there were two staff cottages, farm sheds and outbuildings. The institution was renamed Helderberg College after the mountain towering protectively above it. Despite the depression, the total enrollment climbed to 154 by 1930 and has grown steadily ever since. Today there are more than 60 buildings on campus, including the church, administration and lecture buildings, library, auditorium, gymnasium and cafeteria, student centre, three-story student residences, married students' flats, staff flats and homes, and separate church-operated primary and high schools.

The growth of the College is probably best reflected in the number of graduates which has increased from 8 in 1929 to an average of 40-60 a year. Many of these graduates have continued their studies in South Africa and abroad.

The academic growth of the College can be viewed from three perspectives: the course offerings, educational qualifications of the staff, and library holdings.

A review of the course offerings of the past reveals periods of significant change and development. The first few years after 1928 saw a continuation of the courses offered at Spion Kop College. The staff were few, with the business manager, W B Commin, a chartered accountant. In the early thirties, courses were lengthened to three years, and course contents combined to meet the needs of the church: Theological-Normal, Domestic Science-Normal, with Commercial-Normal being added in 1946. A two-year Bible Instructors' Course was also offered.

The first real significant change in curriculum came in 1951 when the College became a senior college and, under the guidance of A. J. Raitt, started to offer the degree courses of the University of South Africa (UNISA) as part of the regular four-year diploma courses. Students could complete the requirements of the BA, BSc and BCom degrees within four years. The UNISA connection served the College very well for the next 35 years with only minor adjustments to the curriculum. It included a recognised three-year primary teaching diploma in the eighties. The sixties saw a proliferation of diploma courses, and some were lengthened and others shortened. A five-year theology programme was attempted, and even a pre-nursing course was published.

Graduation exercises became more formal with the change of status to a senior college. The 1955 graduating class was the first to wear full academic regalia, including colours to represent the various fields of study. All subsequent classes followed suit, and today it is part of the tradition and policy of the college.

The need for wider recognition and closer control over the curriculum led to the next major change under the leadership of Dr. A. O. Coetzee in 1976. An affiliation agreement was entered into with the Adventist higher education system's flagship institution Andrews University (located in Berrien Springs, Michigan, USA), to offer the BTh (Bachelor of Theology) and BBA (Bachelor of Business Administration) degrees. From this initial agreement, the affiliation was extended to the BA degree, which could also include a four-year elementary teaching qualification. Agriculture offered as a two-year Associate of Science degree met a specific demand for a few years but was later phased out. The eighties saw the introduction of a wider number of business and secretarial diploma courses.

The escalating cost of post-graduate study overseas precipitated plans to offer such degrees at Helderberg College. In 1981, under the leadership of Dr. D. Birkenstock, the Andrews University affiliation was extended when the MA in Religion degree was first offered on campus. The programme was spread over four years, with a quarter being taught each year. Starting with Drs. Strand and Heppenstall, many lecturers from overseas made a real contribution to the ministerial force in Southern Africa. The post-graduate degree gave impetus to the rapid expansion of the library, and in 1983 the E. G. White Research Centre and Heritage Room were officially opened by Mrs. Hedwig Jemison.

Until 1974, the chief administrator of the College was known as the 'Principal'. From 1975, this position was designated as 'Rector', and at the end of 2000, it was changed to 'President'.

In 1997, under the leadership of David F. Allen, an additional affiliation agreement was entered into with Southern Adventist University (located in Collegedale, Tennessee, USA). This affiliation provided alternative accreditation and academic recognition for the BBA degree, majoring in either accounting or management.

Changes in the South African education landscape after the first democratic elections in 1994 impacted directly on the College. In terms of the South African Qualifications Authority (SAQA) Act (No. 58 of 1995) and the Higher Education Act (No. 101 of 1997), private institutions of higher learning were granted the opportunity of becoming fully accredited and registered providers of education, issuing their own degrees and diplomas. Private Higher Education Institutions could register qualifications on the National Qualifications Framework (NQF) of the South African Qualifications Authority (SAQA). In addition, if they met the Council on Higher Education (CHE) requirements and the Department of Education (DoE), they could take their place alongside the public sector institutions in providing nationally and internationally recognised programmes of study.

Under the academic leadership of Dr. Gerald T. du Preez, Helderberg College received such accreditation and registration in 2001. Students who enrolled for degree programmes for the first time in 2001 thus began a course of study culminating in a Helderberg College degree, backed by SAQA, the CHE and the DoE. Students transferring to other tertiary institutions or wishing to engage in postgraduate study in South Africa can do with ease, as there is a common registering body with controlled standards and criteria. In addition, the courses done at Helderberg College are accredited by AAA (Adventist Accrediting Association), which makes them transferable to any one of the more than 115 Seventh-day Adventist institutions worldwide.

The second perspective of the academic growth of the College has been the qualifications of the staff. From the start, the College has had well-qualified staff. In 1936, the small teaching staff had five teachers with master's degrees, two with bachelors', and the remainder with recognised diplomas. The first teacher with a doctorate was H. L. Rasmussen, who joined the staff in 1947 to teach history. In 1949 the principal, W. E. McClure, returned from furlough with a doctorate, as did F. C. Clarke, whose specialty was science. The offering of UNISA degrees on campus made it easier for a number of the staff to earn BA degrees, and in many cases, this led to post-graduate work. In the seventies, there were up to five staff with doctorates. Some of the first lecturers to earn a doctorate at a South African University included Dr. Hofni Joubert (in the late fifties), Dr. Izak J. van Zyl (in the seventies), with Dr. Delyse Steyn being the first woman to achieve this. Helderberg College regards a master's degree as the minimum academic qualification for lecturers. Through its staff development programme, it encourages and assists the teaching faculty in upgrading their qualifications where needed, with the goal of 50% of the teaching staff having their terminal degrees by 2011. This was reached and maintained until 2018-2020, where, due to retirements of long-time serving staff and transfers elsewhere, this has dropped below the target. As of June 2021, 34% of the full time teaching staff have terminal degrees and 36% have masters' degree. Of the remaining staff, all have a minimum of an honours degree or a CA (SA), with many pursuing further studies.

Until 1952, the library at Helderberg College was housed on the top floor of the Administration Building, from where it was moved to the more spacious location on the ground floor of Anderson Hall. The book holdings increased from 4,000 in 1936 to 7,000 in 1947. In 1981, the Pieter Wessels Library, occupying all three floors in the renovated Meade House, was opened officially. While K. B. Cronjé was director of library services, book holdings topped 50,000, besides many other materials such as periodicals, audiotapes and teaching materials. In the basement are the E. G. White Research Centre and the Heritage Room which opened in 1983 with Dr. I. J. van Zyl as director. Through the SABINET link-up with all the major libraries in South Africa, the Pieter Wessels Library has been an invaluable asset to staff and students and users of these other libraries. The holdings have exceeded the 90 000 mark.

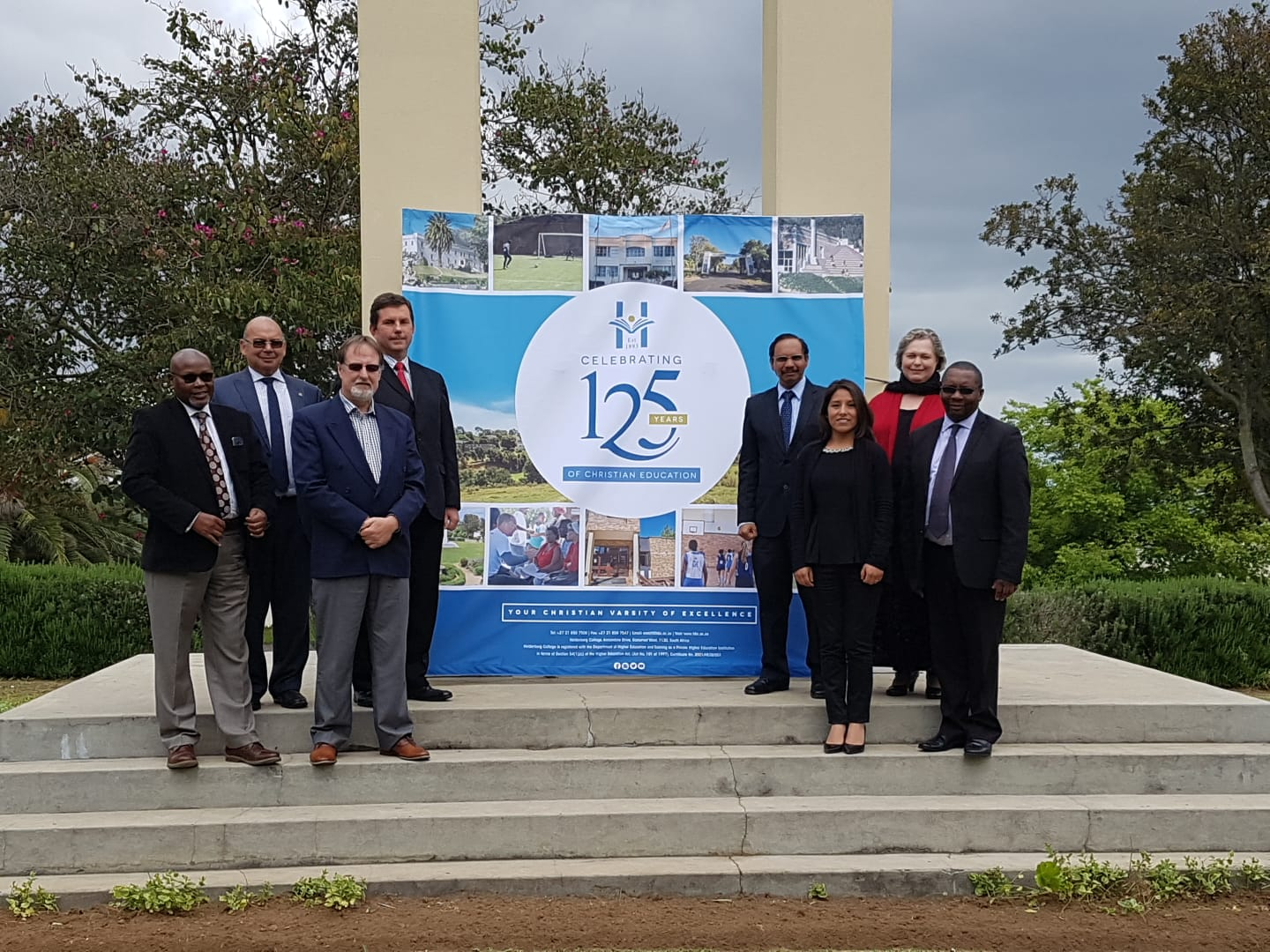
Helderberg College Administrators with the officers of Southern Africa Union of SDA on the occasion of 125th-year celebration.

On 20 October 2017, Helderberg College of Higher Education celebrated the 125th year of its establishment.

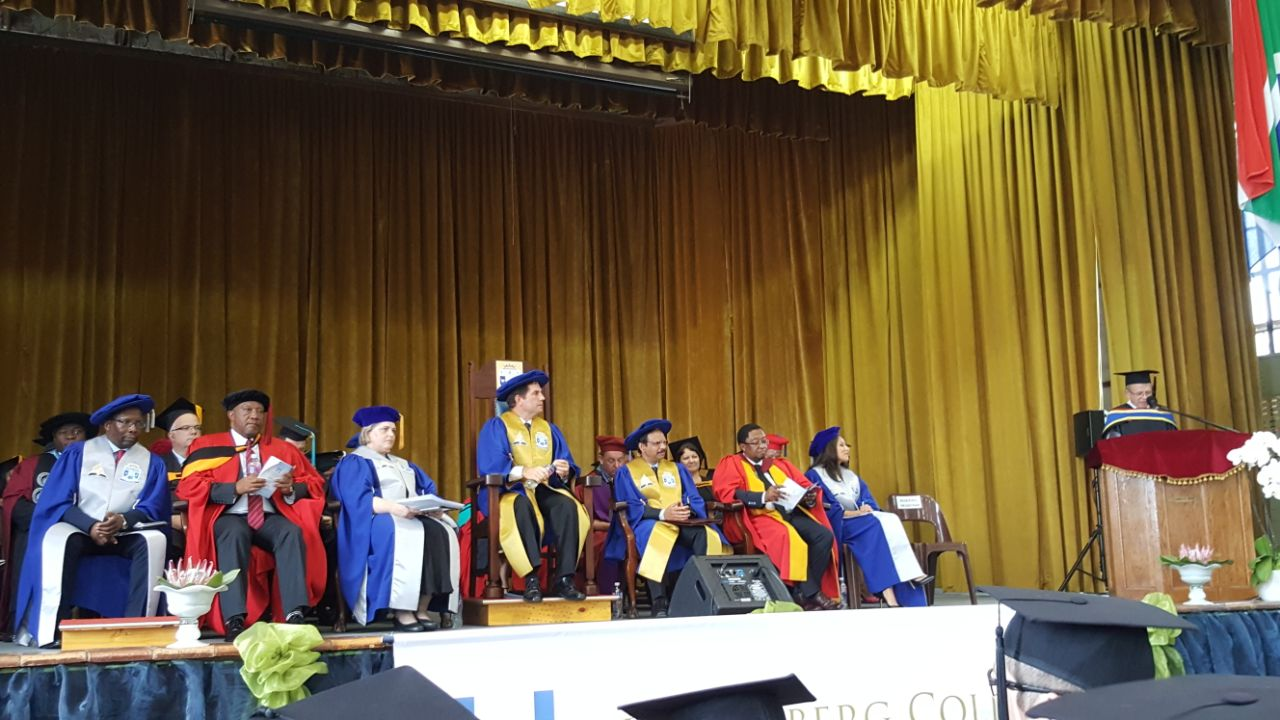
Graduation 2017

== Campus life ==
=== Campus ministries ===
Since it is a Seventh-day Adventist College, a major objective is to "make religion a personal experience in the life of each student, a practical religion which finds expression in the standards of conduct, in the attitudes and ideals, and in the development of a sense of individual responsibility for the betterment of mankind" (Principal M. P. Robison, College Clarion, 1932).

While the forms of spiritual activity have varied over the course of the years, the basic sources of spiritual nourishment have remained surprisingly constant – worship services in church, dormitory and chapel, and the quiet times of personal meditation and prayer. However, spiritual wholeness also requires the outward swing of the pendulum – from receiving to sharing. Helderberg students have never been at a loss for ways to serve. From the establishment of the Missionary Volunteer Society in the early days of Claremont Union College to the present, students have gained valuable experience in leadership as they have organised and run their own outreach activities to those in the community. In the early years there was the Medical Band which provided help to poor communities on Sabbath afternoons. Members of the Preaching Band would, before embarking on Sabbath outreach activities, collect the leftovers of Sabbath lunch at the staff homes on campus along with donations of fruit and vegetables to distribute among the needy in the neighborhood. Singing groups would bring sunshine to patients in nearby hospitals and old age homes. These find their counterparts today in the form of soup kitchens in the squatter camps, outreach to Boys' Town and visiting the sick and elderly in hospitals and old age homes.

=== Physical recreation ===
The harmonious development of all the student's abilities, including his or her physical well-being, has been the basis for the work programme in the history of Helderberg College. Three concepts from the book Education by E G White have served, since the inception of the College, as guidelines in formulating a manual work programme: (a) to demonstrate the true dignity of labour – and so students have been involved in all aspects of work; (b) to recognize that God is constantly at work – and so to fulfill our mission, we must also be involved in productive activity; and (c) to teach the discipline of systematic, well-regulated labour as an aid to sound development and sense of self-worth.

Each of the colleges mentioned above generated activities suitable to its time and circumstances. Claremont Union College had as their main activities sewing, cooking, carpentry, gardening, janitorial services, dairy farming, boot making, typesetting and printing (forerunner of the Southern Publishing Association), and assisting with health treatments. Some students worked at the nearby Claremont Sanitarium, and later the Plumstead Sanitarium. Students were required to work seven hours a week for which they received payment to help defray fees.

Spion Kop College continued the tradition and philosophy, but other activities achieved prominence. A great deal of building was done and so students were involved in brick making, carpentry, and building construction. On the extensive farm lands, they helped with gardening, milking and harvesting. The repair shop sharpened ploughs and repaired trucks. In addition there were particular enterprises to provide work for the students and an income for the College, such as the clothing factory in which some fourteen students worked. Payment for one completed buttonhole was one and a half pence. A nut butter factory was started to provide a non-dairy spread which was in harmony with the health principles of the College. Students were required to work 30 hours a month, for which they were paid.

During the Helderberg College era (from 1928), the number and variety of work opportunities increased. Of the various enterprises launched through the years, the farm is the only one that has maintained operations to the present time and continues to provide the College with an income through olive groves, fruit and vegetables, and pine forestry. In the early days, the students worked as brick makers, builders and carpenters to erect the various college buildings and homes. The new campus needed student workers to lay out gardens, trim hedges, and care for the appearance of the College. With the number of new buildings going up, there was a greater need for cleaning crews. The growing enrolment also meant more students were needed to work in the kitchen and dining room. In the laundry, the young ladies did the washing and ironing, at first by hand and later with more sophisticated equipment. The need for trained drivers increased as the College became more mechanised. The maintenance department was kept busy with plumbing, welding and electrical repairs.

The work activities have changed over the years, but it is still possible for a student to be exposed to a wide variety of activities, should he or she so choose. Today it is no longer compulsory to work a fixed number of hours on campus as in the past. However, exposure to practical work experience on or off campus is an integral part of the student's preparation for graduation. At present approximately a third of the students apply for work bursaries of 5–15 hours per week which enable them to earn up to a third of their fees. Through their work experiences on campus, many students have gained skills that have helped them contribute to building communities wherever they have gone. Many alumni have attributed their success in part to the effective time management, interpersonal skills and respect for productive work that they had learned while in college. And many are the alumni world-wide who can still on occasion recall with satisfaction the sound of the knock-off bell!

=== Student clubs ===
Since the very origins of universities in the thirteenth century, students have organised themselves into clubs. Helderberg has been no exception. Through the years a wide variety of clubs, guilds, brigades and other organisations have come and gone.

Student organisations have always played an important role in the activities of the College. For a number of years the Department of Business Administration had AIESEC, a branch of the international business students' organisation, which provided a forum for involvement with students in other institutions. At one time they published a monthly magazine called Busblitz. In November 2008 the Business Faculty, under Dr .Vincent Injety, published the first edition of Biz Voce. The Theology Forum is active in inviting speakers from many walks of life to address the students in that department. The faculty published a journal called the Ostraka for many years. The Secretarial Forum also arranges activities to provide enrichment of experience and expertise. Members of the Arts Forum help to fill social and academic needs both on and off campus. The SRC (Student Representative Council) liaises between students and the College administration and arranges numerous student activities like weekend camps, sports and entertainment programmes, and publishes the annual Parade and the weekly Indaba.

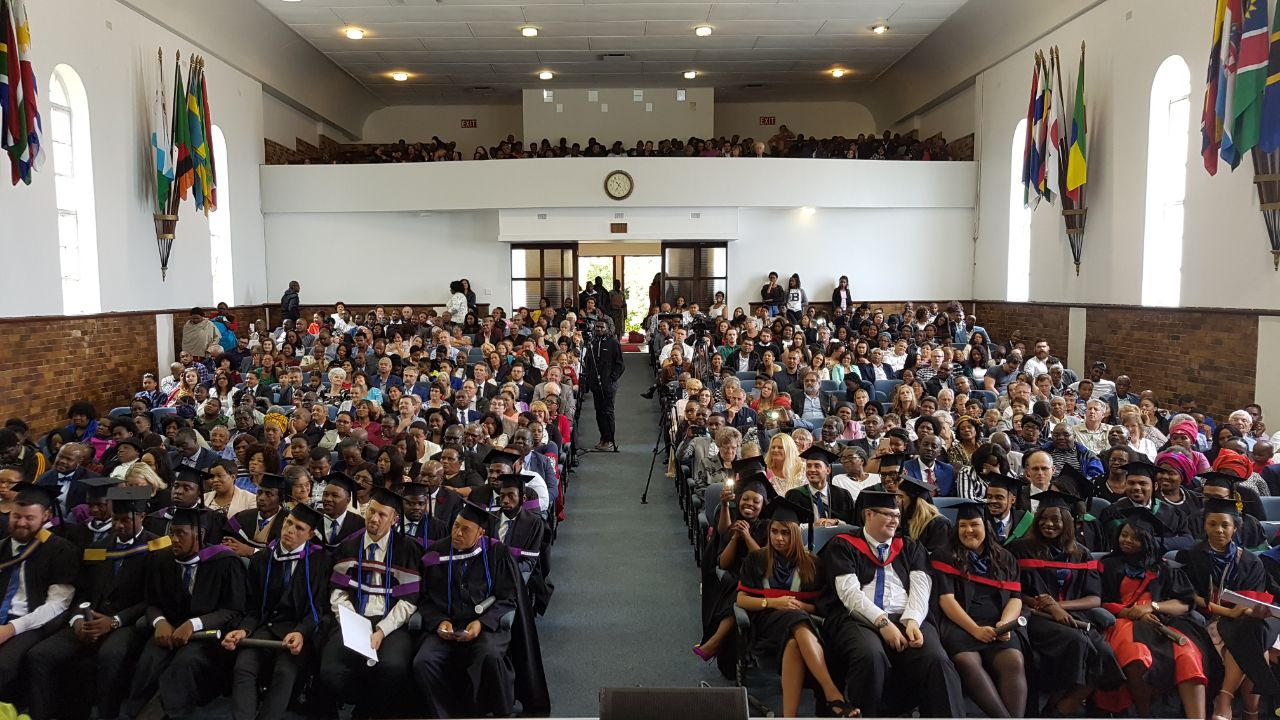
Graduation 2017 at Helderberg College of Higher Education

== Presidents of Helderberg College ==
Until 1974, the chief administrator of the College was known as the "Principal". From 1975, this position was designated as "Rector", and in 2001 it was changed to "President".

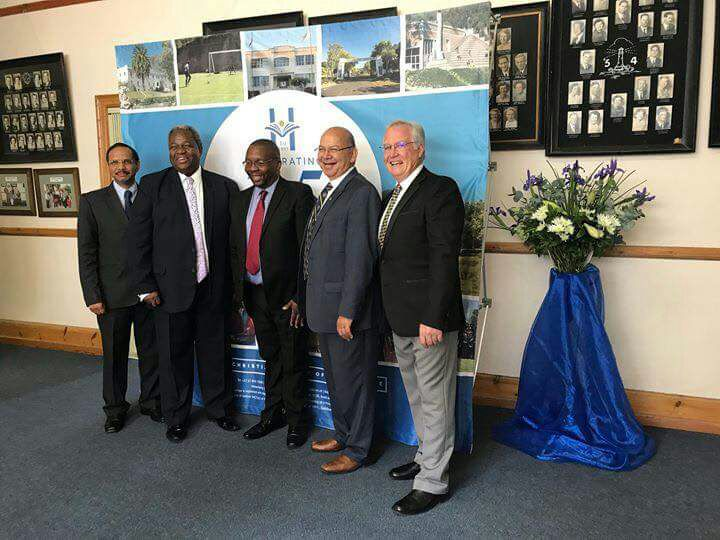
On the occasion of 125 years celebration---Dr. Vincent Richard Injety with the past presidents of Helderberg College: Dr Paul Shongwe, Dr Tankiso Letseli, Dr Gerald du Preez, Dr Dave Allen

=== Claremont Union College (1893 – 1917) ===
- B. Miller, 1893 – 1894
- Mrs. A. Druillard, 1895
- Miss S. Peck, 1896
- J. L. Shaw, 1897 – 1900
- A. Ruble, 1901 – 1902
- C. H. Hayton, 1902 – 1907
- W. S. Hyatt, 1908
- J. F. Olmstead, 1909
- C. P. Crager, 1910 – 1915
- W. E. Straw, 1916 – 1917

=== Spionkop College (First "South African Training School") (1919 – 1927) ===
- J. I. Robison, 1919
- U. Bender, 1920 – 1921
- J. D. Stickle, 1922
- E. D. Dick, 1923 - 1927

=== Helderberg College (First "African Missionary College") (1928 -) ===
- M. P. Robison, 1928 – 1933
- G. Shankel, 1934 – 1941
- W. E. McClure, 1942 – 1954
- E. L. Tarr, 1955 – 1961
- P. J. van Eck, 1961 – 1965
- H. E. Marais, 1966 – 1972
- A. O. Coetzee, 1973 – 1978
- D. Birkenstock, 1979 – 1995
- D. F. Allen, 1996 – 2002 (June)
- G. T. du Preez (acting), 2002 (July) – 2003 (March)
- G. M. Ross, 2003 (March) – 2005 (June)
- G. T. du Preez, 2005 (July) - 2010 (December)
- T. L. Letseli, 2011 January
- P. Shongwe, June 2011 - 2013 (January)
- V. R. Injety, (Acting) January 2013 - June 2013
- V. R. Injety, June 2013 - 2020 (December)
- T. L. Letseli, 2021 (January) - 2023 (June)
- Charlene Reinecke, 2023 September to present.

== Academic divisions ==
Helderberg College has three faculties:

- Faculty of Social Sciences and Education
- Faculty of Business Studies
- Faculty of Theology

=== Programmes offered ===
Faculty of Social Sciences and Education

- Bachelor of Arts in Communication with emphasis in Corporate Communication or Media Studies
- Bachelor of Arts in Psychology with emphasis in Counseling or Industrial Psychology
- Bachelor of Education in Foundation Phase Teaching
- English Language Institute with certificates from Beginners to Advanced; TOEFL preparation

Faculty of Business

- Higher Certificate in Office Management
- Bachelor of Commerce in Accounting
- Bachelor of Business Administration in Management
- Bachelor of Commerce in Human Resource Management

Faculty of Theology

- Bachelor of Arts in Theology
- Higher Certificate in Christian Ministries

== See also ==
- List of Seventh-day Adventist colleges and universities
- Seventh-day Adventist education
