= The Ashes of Waco: An Investigation =

Nonfiction book on the Waco siege

- Author: Dick J. Reavis
- Language: English
- Genre: non-fiction
- Publisher: Simon & Schuster, Syracuse University Press
- Publication date: July 1995
- Pages: 320
- ISBN: 9780684811321
- OCLC: 246907421

The Ashes of Waco: An Investigation is a 1995 non-fiction book by journalist Dick J. Reavis about the Waco siege. Reavis is a professor of English at North Carolina State University and former reporter for the San Antonio Light and San Antonio Express. The book was first published by Simon & Schuster in 1995, and it was later re-published by Syracuse University Press in 1998. According to Catherine Wessinger, Reavis argues that "the story of the Davidian tragedy was not reported fully, in part because the FBI controlled information, but also because reporters did not investigate". Reavis went to work for the Dallas Observer while researching the book.

== Reception ==
Catherine Wessinger, a religious studies scholar, in Nova Religio argued that although Reavis's research seemed extensive and he seemed to be reliable, it was up to the reader to trust his assertions, especially because he did not provide citations. She believes that Reavis provides a "humanized" version of the Branch Davidians, David Koresh, and the federal agents. Overall, she thinks the book is a "good introduction" to the Waco siege for the general reader.

Dean M. Kelley, a legal scholar, believes that The Ashes of Waco is the "single best source" for a "vivid, engaging, reliable narrative of events at Waco".

Jacob Sullum for Reason calls Reavis's book "thorough and lively" and compliments Reavis on being "meticulous and fairminded" and remaining "agnostic" on the issue of how the 19 April 1993 fire started.

Nancy T. Ammerman for The Review of Politics points out that many of the sources in his work, like the complete transcripts of FBI negotiations with the Branch Davidians, are not publicly available, and he did not divulge how he obtained them. Ammerman complimented Reavis's dedication to studying the Bible and Branch Davidian theology for his book. Murray Seeger for Niemann Reports also complimented his work to study Branch Davidian theology.

Caroline Hartse was disappointed by the book's lack of "in-depth examination of broader issues and themes" despite arguing more specific points very well. Hartse also criticized the book's lack of citations; the book occasionally left quotations unattributed. Some of the descriptions of important people in the conflict like Sheila J. Martin and Marc Breault were distracting and played no role in the narrative of the Waco siege, according to Hartse.

Carol Moore, Libertarian activist and author of The Davidian Massacre: Disturbing Questions About Waco That Must Be Answered, believes that although the book is insightful as an introduction to the siege, only a team of independent investigators could reveal the truth of the conflict.

Timothy K. McMorrow for Trial believes that the book contains "strange claims, questionable conclusions, and a description of [Koresh] that purports to be evenhanded but is just short of sycophantic".

LeAnne Burch in the Military Law Review believes that Reavis failed in respect to providing alternatives to what the federal government did at Waco to prevent further deaths; Burch also notes that Reavis did not provide a clear answer to "what happened at Waco" and accuses him of "antigovernment sentiment".

Ashley Fantz for CNN called the book "exhaustive". A reviewer in the American Journal of Criminal Law called the book an "in-depth look at the standoff in Waco". B. Seth Bailey, also in the American Journal of Criminal Law, believes that the book is not only a "thought-provoking book" but a "useful reference" text for anyone interested in the Waco siege. However, Bailey concludes that the book is a "better guide to which questions should be asked, than it is to which answers are correct".

Gregg Easterbrook in Washington Monthly calls the book "excellent" yet criticizes it for its "average" prose. Easterbrook disagrees with Reavis's depiction of Koresh as, at least at points, as a "misunderstood kid".
