= Jeff Jamar =

FBI agent

Jeffrey John Jamar (born September 11, 1943, in Austin, Texas) is an American law enforcement officer, who was the Special Agent in Charge (SAC) for the Federal Bureau of Investigation during the 1993 Waco siege. Jamar retired from the FBI in December 1994 after 25 years in service.

== Early career ==
From 1982, Jamar worked as an informant coordinator at FBI headquarters. On May 25, 1982, Jamar met with FBI agents Robert Fitzpatrick, Gerald Montanari, Robert McEleney, SAC Ed Enright, Randy Prillaman, Sean McWeeney, Joe Rush, and supervisors Ronald Reese and Anthony Amoroso, to discuss the murders of Brian Halloran and Roger Wheeler. Jamar became involved because two FBI informants were under investigation for being complicit in the murder. This perceived "bungling" was later mentioned in a civil suit alleging widespread mismanagement of the informant system.

Jamar was the SAC of the FBI's Minneapolis field office from 1990, and San Antonio office from 1993.

== Waco ==
Jamar served as the siege commander during the Waco siege, aided by agents Bob Ricks, Richard Schwein, Richard Swensen and Richard Rogers.

He was a defendant in the 1999 civil suit Andrade et al. vs Chojnacki et al.
