= The Branch Davidians of Waco: The History and Beliefs of an Apocalyptic Sect =

2006 non-fiction book by Kenneth G. C. Newport

- Author: Kenneth G. C. Newport
- Language: English
- Genre: nonfiction
- Publisher: Oxford University Press
- Publication date: 2006
- Pages: 393 pp.
- ISBN: 9780199245741
- OCLC: 260078126

The Branch Davidians of Waco: The History and Beliefs of an Apocalyptic Sect is a 2006 nonfiction book by Kenneth G. C. Newport about the Branch Davidians before, during, and after the Waco siege. It was published by Oxford University Press. The book primarily addresses the beliefs, practices, and crucial events in Branch Davidian history through Victor Houteff to David Koresh and Clive Doyle.

== Reception ==
Heidi Gehman for Reviews in Religion and Theology praises the book as "valuable both as an even-handed examination of the events that took place in Waco in 1993, and even more so as an excellent scholarly effort to understand the inner workings of the theological and biblical vision of a religious movement". Jeffrey W. Barbeau for the Journal of Ecclesiastical History notes that Newport "debunks the simplistic, commonplace notion that the Branch Davidians were nothing more a group of blindly 'duped followers who [were] either too stupid or too brainwashed to see through the manipulative tactics of their egocentric leader'". James D. Tabor for Nova Religio believes that Newport provides a strong historical account of the Branch Davidian and Davidian Seventh-day Adventist movements, but Newport's analysis of the last two weeks of the siege are very weak. Eugene V. Gallagher for the Journal of the American Academy of Religion finds merit in the historical account also and finds flaws in his arguments on the end of the siege.

Stuart A. Wright for the Journal for the Scientific Study of Religion finds the book "disturbing and flawed". He believes that Newport at times blatantly accepted federal agents' self-serving accounts of what happened without addressing critical evidences to the contrary, like various reports from Congressional hearings. Wright believes that his thesis on Branch Davidian theology's connection to the start of the 19 April fire that ended the siege requires more scholarly debate. In another article for Nova Religio, Wright thoroughly critiques the claims about who or what caused the fire in Newport's book and other work.
