= A Place Called Waco: A Survivor's Story =

Biography of a Waco siege survivor

- Authors: David Thibodeau, Leon Whiteson, Aviva Layton (rev. ed.)
- Audio read by: Robert Fass (rev. ed.)
- Language: English
- Genre: autobiography
- Publisher: PublicAffairs
- Publication date: 9 September 1999
- Publication place: United States
- Pages: 384
- ISBN: 9781891620423
- OCLC: 41368317
- Followed by: Waco: A Survivor's Story

A Place Called Waco: A Survivor's Story is the memoir of Waco siege survivor David Thibodeau (born 1969). He co-authored it with novelist Leon Whiteson (1930–2013). It was originally published in 1999 by PublicAffairs, and it was re-released by Hachette Books in 2018 with the title Waco: A Survivor's Story as a revised and updated version. It corresponded with the release of Waco, a 2018 miniseries partially inspired by Thibodeau's account. Aviva Layton co-authored the re-release with Thibodeau and Whiteson. Robert Fass narrated the audiobook version of Waco: A Survivor's Story. According to Publishers Weekly, the book was originally rejected by over 20 publishing houses before reaching PublicAffairs.

When the book was being shipped out from the publisher in September 1999, federal officials in late August 1999 changed their version of events to include the use of pyrotechnic tear gas canisters against the Mount Carmel Center on 19 April 1993. However, they believe they harmlessly bounced off some concrete into a field and that the Branch Davidians were the ones who started the fire that destroyed it.

== Reception ==
One Publishers Weekly reviewer complimented David Thibodeau for not lapsing "into overstatement", and they wrote that the book is "far from an extremist apologia". Michael Sawyer for the Library Journal recommended it for public libraries since there was a renewed interest in the Waco siege when it was published. Margo Hammond for the St. Petersburg Times calls the book "remarkably nuanced" in its recounting of events and notes that the book lays a bit of blame on everyone for the tragedy.

Eric Robbins for Booklist notes the challenging nature of the work against the federal government's account of events, and he believes that Thibodeau's version of events is weakened by his lack of citations. Alicia Anstead of the Bangor Daily Mail writes that although the strength of the book is its a survivor's account of the siege and Thibodeau's struggles through it, American audiences likely will not "warm to the practices of David Koresh", accused of statutory rape and cult leadership.
