= Ron Cole =

Ronald G. Cole is a figure in the American militia movement in the United States. He was the founder and leader of the Colorado Light Infantry militia groups in 1993. Cole is the author of the book Sinister Twilight, in which he attempts to explain the Branch Davidian side of the standoff with federal authorities that took place in Waco, Texas in 1993. Cole became a national anti-government figure after the events of the Waco siege.

In 1994, he met with the notorious domestic terrorist Timothy McVeigh prior to the Oklahoma City bombing In 1997 at McVeigh's trial, Cole handed out leaflets demanding fair treatment for McVeigh, as well as news releases for the North American Liberation Army. He also spoke to the media about alleged harassment of paramilitary group members by law enforcement.

Also in 1994, Cole was involved in an incident at the site of the destroyed Branch Davidian compound in Waco. A standoff occurred between self-proclaimed leaders of the remnants of the sect over who had control of the property. Cole and another Branch Davidian, Wally Kennett, were accompanying Andrew Hood, a man who had been supportive of the Branch Davidians, to the property. Their party was fired upon by Amo Bishop Roden, the wife of former Davidian leader George Roden who lived in a shack on the site. Roden was charged with felony deadly conduct, and Kennett and Cole were charged with misdemeanor weapons violations.

In 1997 Cole and three other militia members were arrested by federal agents and local officers in response to a warrant alleging they possessed machine guns in their house in Aurora, Colorado. In 1998 Cole pleaded guilty in a plea bargain to four federal counts of illegally possessing unregistered firearms. In response Cole said "They're trying to make me look like a terrorist because I criticize the federal government publicly." Lee Hill, a defense attorney who represented the left wing icon Leonard Peltier, said "They made an example of him. He's an idealist who has annoyed the wrong people." Cole was sentenced to 27 months in federal prison and was released in May 1999.
