= Ken Ballew raid =

1971 controversial federal raid on a gun-collector in Silver Spring, Maryland

Kenyon Ballew raid
- Date: June 7, 1971; 55 years ago
- Location: 1014 Quebec Terrace, Silver Spring, Maryland, U.S.

Parties
Kenyon F. Ballew; Saraluise McNeil	Alcohol, Tobacco, and Firearms Division; Montgomery County Police Department

The Ken Ballew raid was a federal raid on June 7, 1971, on the home of Kenyon F. "Ken" Ballew which became a cause célèbre in the debates between advocates of gun control and advocates of gun ownership rights in the United States.

== Investigation ==
In 1971, the federal Alcohol, Tobacco, and Firearms Division (ATFD) (Note: The ATFD was the predecessor of the Bureau of Alcohol, Tobacco, Firearms and Explosives.) and the local Montgomery County and Prince George's County police departments planned a joint task force operation on the residence of James Russell Thomas, at Apartment No. 102, 1014 Quebec Terrace, in an apartment complex in Silver Spring, Maryland.

A teenage burglary suspect, cooperating with police as an informant, told the county investigators that he had seen guns and grenades in Apartment No. 2 of a white man named "Ken" who drove a white jeep.

Shortly after the middle of May, in 1971, Special Agent Marcus J. Davis of the ATFD received information from Detective W. F. Seminuk, of the Prince George's County Police Department, indicating that a quantity of hand grenades had been observed by a confidential reliable source in Apartment No. 2 at 1014 Quebec Terrace, Silver Spring, Maryland.

ATFD added Apt. 2 to the original raid planned for Apt. 102. When this was run by the U.S. Attorney Office (USAO) on 4 June 1971, Assistant U.S. Attorney (AUSA) Charles Bernstein informed agent Davis that the information provided was not sufficient to justify searching Apt. 2 in addition to Apt. 102.

Agent Davis set out to compile additional incriminatory evidence to justify adding Apt. 2 to the raid on Apt. 102. Part of the additional information was "Ken's" full name. ATFD also presented as evidence an anonymous threat from "a source residing in the vicinity of 1014 Quebec Terrace that the police would receive a false criminal report in the vicinity of that apartment building and that police would be shot when they responded to this call." No evidence was presented that the source of this threat was either Apt. 2 or Apt. 102 or even 1014 Quebec Terrace, just "the vicinity" (ATFD stressed that the vicinity of 1014 Quebec Terrace was described as a high crime neighborhood, a haven for known criminals, with frequent reports of burglary and gunfire). A search of records showed that Ken Ballew was arrested on 20 November 1970 for a misdemeanor (for carrying a concealed weapon) and that he had not registered any grenades with the National Firearms Act registry.

This additional information, presented on June 7, 1971, the day of the raid, was deemed an adequate probable cause to add Apt. 2 to the raid on Apt. 102. The search warrant was approved for knock-service daytime search.

== Raid ==
The joint task force of ATFD and county police attempted to carry out raids on two apartments in the same building while retaining the element of surprise: this raised the sense of urgency. The raid team wore "street clothes" to blend in with the "high crime" neighborhood.

In Apt. 102 the raid team found only two minor children present (a small child and a slightly older babysitter); the agents left a note for James Russell Thomas.

The raid on Apt. 2 was conducted at 8:30 p.m. The apartment had a solid metal door that opened onto a utility corridor that led to the apartment complex laundry room; Ballew kept that door blocked with furniture. Apt. 2 also had a glass door that Ballew used to enter and exit his apartment. The glass door allowed visitors to identify themselves and their purpose for admission. The raid team entered the utility corridor by a service entrance and approached the solid door to avoid being identified by the occupants.

ATFD agent William H. Seals claimed he knocked on the door, announced "Federal officers with a search warrant, open up." No one opened the door but by placing his ear to the door, Seals heard indistinct sounds of movement inside. ATFD agent Marcus J. Davis decided the occupants had heard the knock and call-out and had been allowed enough time to open the door. Davis ordered the team to breach the door with a battering ram.

Saraluise McNeil claimed that Ken Ballew was in the bath and that she was half-dressed in the bedroom. When the battering ram was first applied to the door, McNeil panicked. Ballew then got out of the bathroom and grabbed an 1847 Colt Walker revolver. McNeil claimed that they believed burglars were invading their home and that she armed herself with her own revolver based on that belief. The door was designed to defeat burglary attempts and took six blows to break open.

ATFD agent William H. Seals in civilian clothes (but wearing a badge) came through the door first and saw a nude man in the hallway aiming a revolver at him. Seals yelled to the county officers behind him "He's got a gun!", drew his own pistol from his holster, fired a shot and moved to the left.

In the corridor, a county police officer, Royce R. Hibbs, heard the warning "He's got a gun!" followed by a gunshot; Hibbs came through the door next, ducked to the right, firing several shots as he moved.

Officer Louis Ciamillo was third through the door. Ciamillo took aim at Ballew and shot Ballew in the head. Ballew fell to the floor. It was after Ballew was hit and falling that his antique handgun discharged a single round. Ballew's only shot struck the wall at an angle to the hallway at floor level in a downward direction.

Also in the apartment at the time was Mrs. McNeil, who had likewise armed herself with a loaded pistol before the shooting occurred. Clad only in her underwear, she surrendered to the officers when ordered to do so, becoming hysterical and shouting, "Help, murder, police," when she saw plaintiff lying wounded on the floor. An ambulance was called, and plaintiff was removed to the hospital. The agents and officers then undertook a search of the premises, recovering a large quantity of firearms, powder, ammunition, primers, fuses and other firearm parts, including the following grenade-type items:

(1) 1 practice rifle grenade, marked "inert";

(2) 1 smoke or gas grenade canister, with no fuse assembly;

(3) 1 smoke or gas grenade canister, with fuse assembly;

(4) 1 practice hand grenade, with fuse assembly;

(5) 1 plastic grenade, baseball type, with fuse assembly.

== The "grenade-type" items ==
While one grenade was explicitly marked "inert," all were unloaded dummy or inert grenades of the type sold at Army-Navy surplus stores as curios or relics. Such grenades were classified by then (1971) and later (2009) ATF regulations as non-weapon curios and may be owned as military souvenirs without federal registry. Of the five grenades, two were bookends for a collection of military books and three had been rigged to pop caps: Ballew had used them as handheld noisemakers on Fourth of July on his balcony (the ATF affidavit stated "that Ken had been observed in the recent past playing with several hand grenades in the rear of 1014 Quebec Terrace.") The three grenades with fuse assemblies did not contain igniter cap, fuse or detonating cap; they had been demilitarized to not retain an explosive charge.

== After the raid ==
No trials and no convictions resulted from the raids on Apt. 102 and Apt. 2 at 1014 Quebec Terrace on June 7, 1971. Ballew survived his head wound but suffered brain damage. Ballew filed a tort suit against the United States.

Ballew's attorney pointed out exculpatory evidence ignored by the ATFD. Ballew was a former US Air Force (USAF) security policeman with a clean military record. At the time of the raid Ballew was gainfully employed as a printing pressman at the Washington Star newspaper and was a Boy Scout troop leader. He was a member of the National Rifle Association (NRA) and owned a collection of legal firearms, mostly Civil War era reproductions. As ex-military, he might reasonably be expected to own souvenirs like inert dummy grenades. While he had an arrest for "carrying concealed weapon", he had no criminal convictions.

== The tort suit ==
Ballew sued the government under the Federal Tort Claims Act (FTCA) claiming damages for personal injuries, alleging that the negligence of government agents proximately caused his injuries. Ballew's head shot injuries from 1971 were such that he could not be in court for the 1975 trial. Ballew was represented by civilian attorney John T. Bonner while the government was represented by J. Charles Kruse and David B. Waller from the US DoJ, and George Beall and James E. Anderson from the district USAO. The case was heard by District Judge Alexander Harvey II.

To guide his ruling, the judge cited long standing principles in federal court: "Acts performed under the stress of an emergency are to be judged for negligence with a different measure from that used in weighing acts performed under normal conditions." and courts "must not too strictly limit what a federal officer should do in carrying out a dangerous duty imposed on him * * * by virtue of his office."

The judge ruled that if Ballew had been shot by federal agent Seals, that would be an assault and battery, a criminal act not a negligent act, and the tort act was not the appropriate statute to pursue redress. Since Ballew was actually shot by Ciamillo, a county policeman, the shooting was not an act of a federal officer so the federal government could not be held negligent. The government rejected the defense claim that ATFD agent Seals was responsible for the responses of Hibbs and Ciamillo by yelling to the county officers "He's got a gun" and opening fire while they were out in the hallway.

The judge ruled: "On the record here, this Court concludes both that agents of the United States were not negligent in acting as they did before the shooting, and that plaintiff's injuries were caused by his own contributory negligence." The judge went over the defense claims and the facts established by the government.

Ballew's lawyer claimed the federal government was negligent in relying on stale, hearsay and erroneous information. The defense alleged that the informant against Ballew was not a reliable source; that the ATFD affidavit was so poorly researched that the "white jeep" was actually a Ford Bronco, not a Willys Jeep, and that the fact Ballew's last name was unknown to ATFD until the day of the raid was evidence of negligence.

The judge ruled that ATFD relied on information from the county police whom ATFD had every reason to consider a reliable source. Also "a Ford Bronco looks like and could readily be described as a Jeep." The defense argument that an informant who could describe a Bronco as a Jeep could also describe legal arms as illegal arms was rejected.

To counter defense claims that the inert grenades were legal curios or ornaments and not live weapons, the judge cited a prior case as establishing that possession of a glass bottle, flammable liquid and cloth in the same place at the same time was constructive possession of a molotov cocktail and prosecution did not require an assembled molotov cocktail; therefore, Ballew's possession of both inert grenades and of gunpowder and primers for his guns also constituted possession of live hand grenades, even without assembly of live grenades. Also by modifying three of the grenades to pop caps as noise makers, Ballew had weaponized the grenades and they were no longer inert curios or ornaments. "Although these grenades could not have been exploded as found, they could have been fully activated. ... "

The defense alleged that staging a raid by fourteen or more agents from different agencies on a domicile had a high potential for error and was negligent. The government countered that the officers acted in overwhelming numbers because 1014 Quebec Terrace was in a high crime neighborhood, with many reports of burglary and gunfire.

The government also argued that, by barricading the entrance to their home and being armed, Ballew and McNeil "were actively resisting the entry of the law enforcement officers." The government disputed the defense claims that the solid metal door that opened on the utility corridor was the back door and that the door with a glass window that opened on the street was the "front" door. The government stated that even if it was the back door and not the front door, it was an entrance and Ballew was obliged to open it immediately upon the knock of a federal officer serving a lawful warrant.

The judge disputed Ballew's claim he was in the bathtub when agent Seals knocked on the utility door:

Whatever plaintiff was doing in the nude before the officers entered his apartment, he was not, as he claims, in the bathtub when they first knocked on his door. The evidence discloses, in the words of one witness, that he was "bone dry" when shot. More likely, plaintiff was not dressed when he first heard law enforcement officers at his door and in his haste to arm himself and try to keep them out, he did not take the time to clothe himself.

While Saraluise McNeil and Kenyon Ballew were married seven months after the 1971 raid and she testified at the 1975 tort trial as Mrs. Ballew, the court referred to her as "the woman he was then living with" and repeatedly referred to her as "Mrs. McNeil."

The judge disputed Ballew's lawyer's claim that Ballew believed his home was being invaded by criminals, not by police.

At any time while the ram was being used, plaintiff could have avoided damage to his door (and presumably the later personal injuries he sustained) by opening the door and admitting the officers who were then lawfully engaged in serving this federal warrant."

The judge concluded:

For the reasons stated, the plaintiff is not entitled to recover damages for the injuries he has sustained. Judgment is therefore entered in favor of the defendant, with costs.

== Aftermath and controversy ==
Multiple claims echoed in the gun press: that a proper investigation would have shown that Ballew was not a dangerous person, that such evidence as was presented against Ballew did not rise to the level of probable cause to justify a raid, that the proper way to execute a knock-service warrant specifying a day-time search of a home is to go in daylight to the front door, knock, and present the warrant to the subject, that breaking down the backdoor with a battering ram at 8:30 p.m. was not day-time knock-service, that when un-uniformed people break down one's door at night the natural reaction is to defend oneself, and that this incident demonstrated that the ATFD zeal in enforcing gun control had gone too far.

The Ken Ballew raid, and in particular some of the statements made in support of the raid by gun control advocates, radicalized many gun rights advocates in the 1970s. The Ballew raid formed the context of much of the reaction to the 1992 Ruby Ridge and 1993 Waco sieges.

The NRA's position, previously aligned with government efforts, shifted quickly, condemning the actions of the federal government.

Shortly after the Ballew raid, an internal federal review of guidelines on the gathering of evidence and on the conduct of searches led to revisions of those guidelines. However, at Congressional hearings on the Waco raid in 1995, Victor Oboyski, testifying as then-president of the Federal Law Enforcement Officers Association, a pro-federal agent lobbying organization, stated:

The day of a couple of agents or a couple of detectives walking up to somebody's front door and knocking on a door in three piece suits to execute a warrant of any kind is over ...
