= Waco siege =

1993 US law enforcement siege in Texas

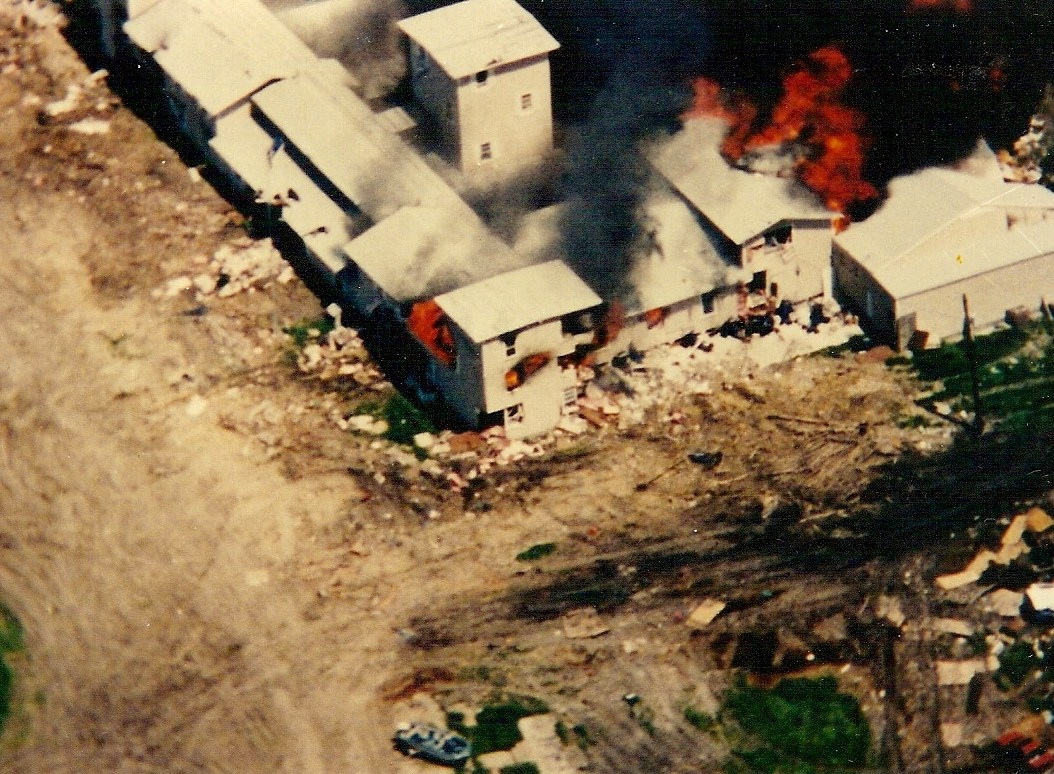
- The Mount Carmel Center in flames on April 19, 1993
- Date: February 28 – April 19, 1993 (51 days)
- Location: Mount Carmel Center, Elk, McLennan County, Texas, US; 31°35′45″N 96°59′17″W
- Caused by: Suspected weapons violations
- Goals: Attempt to serve search and arrest warrants by the ATF; Attempt to end the 51-day siege by the FBI
- Result: Fire destroys compound: 86 dead, including 10 on February 28

Parties
United States government; ATF; FBI; HRT; Texas Rangers; Texas Military Forces; Alabama National Guard	Branch Davidians

Lead figures
Les Aspin; Janet Reno; Ronald Noble; Stephen Higgins; Jeff Jamar; Bob Ricks; Richard Rogers; Ann Richards; H. Guy Hunt	David Koresh †; Steven Schneider ‡‡; Wayne Martin †

Number
700+ ATF and FBI agents	126 Branch Davidians (including 46 children; 82 killed, 35 released, 9 escaped from the fire)

Casualties and losses
ATF: 4 killed; 16 wounded; Total: 20 Casualties	Branch Davidians: 6 killed on February 28; 76 killed on April 19 (including 28 children); 11 wounded; Total: 93 Casualties
- Location within Texas

The Waco siege, also known as the Waco massacre, was the siege by US federal government and Texas state law enforcement officials of a compound belonging to the religious cult known as the Branch Davidians, between February 28 and April 19 of 1993, which resulted in the deaths of 86 people, including 28 children. The Branch Davidians, led by David Koresh, were headquartered at Mount Carmel Center ranch in unincorporated McLennan County, Texas, 13 miles (21 km) northeast of Waco. Suspecting the group of stockpiling illegal weapons, the Bureau of Alcohol, Tobacco, and Firearms (ATF) obtained a search warrant for the compound and arrest warrants for Koresh and several of the group's members.

The ATF had planned a sudden daylight raid of the ranch in order to serve these warrants. Any advantage of surprise was lost when a local reporter who had been tipped off about the raid asked for directions from a US Postal Service mail carrier who was coincidentally Koresh's brother-in-law. Thus, the group's members were fully armed and prepared; upon the ATF initiating the raid, an intense gunfight erupted, resulting in the deaths of four ATF agents and six Branch Davidians. Following the ATF entering the property and its failure to execute the search warrant, a siege was initiated by the Federal Bureau of Investigation (FBI), during which negotiations between the parties attempted to reach a compromise.

After 51 days, on April 19, 1993, the FBI launched a CS gas (tear gas) attack in an attempt to force the Branch Davidians out of the compound's buildings. Shortly thereafter, the Mount Carmel Center became engulfed in flames. The fire resulted in the deaths of 76 Branch Davidians, including 20–28 children and Koresh.

The details about the events of the siege and attack in Elk, Texas (outside of Waco), particularly the origin of the fire, have been disputed by various sources. Department of Justice reports from October 1993 and July 2000 state that the Branch Davidians had started the fire, though they acknowledge that the FBI used pyrotechnic CS gas canisters. They cited evidence from audio surveillance recordings of very specific discussions between Koresh and others about pouring more fuel on piles of hay as the fires started, and from aerial footage that ostensibly showed at least three simultaneous ignition points at different locations in the building complex. The FBI has stated that none of their agents fired any live rounds on the day of the fire. However, several independent critics of the American government narrative have argued that live rounds were fired by law enforcement, and suggest that a combination of gunshots and flammable CS gas was the true cause of the fire.

The Ruby Ridge standoff and the Waco siege were cited by Timothy McVeigh as the main reasons for his and Terry Nichols's plan to execute the Oklahoma City bombing exactly two years later, on April 19, 1995, as well as the modern-day American militia movement.

== Background ==
The Branch Davidians were a cult that originated in 1955 from a schism in the Shepherd's Rod (Davidians) following the death of the Shepherd's Rod founder Victor Houteff. Houteff founded the Davidians based on his prophecy of an imminent apocalypse involving the Second Coming of Jesus Christ and the defeat of the evil armies of Babylon. As the original Davidian group gained members, its leadership moved the church to a hilltop several miles east of Waco, Texas, which they named Mount Carmel, after a mountain in Israel mentioned in Joshua 19:26 in the Bible's Old Testament.

A few years later, they relocated again to a much larger site east of the city. In 1959, Victor's widow, Florence Houteff, announced that the expected Armageddon was about to take place, and members were told to gather at the center to await this event. Many of them built houses, others stayed in tents, trucks, or buses, and most of them sold their possessions.

After the failure of this prophecy, control of the site (Mount Carmel Center) fell to Benjamin Roden, founder of the Branch Davidian Seventh-day Adventist Association (Branch Davidians). He promoted different doctrinal beliefs than those of Victor Houteff's original Davidian Seventh-day Adventist organization. On Roden's death, control of the Branch Davidians fell to his wife, Lois Roden. Lois considered their son, George Roden, unfit to assume the position of prophet. Instead, she groomed Vernon Wayne Howell (later known as David Koresh) to be her successor.

In 1984, a meeting resulted in a division of the group, with Howell leading one faction (calling themselves the Branch Davidians) and George Roden leading the competing faction. After this split, George Roden ran Howell and his followers off Mount Carmel at gunpoint. Howell and his group relocated to Palestine, Texas.

After the death of Lois Roden in November 1986 and probate of her estate in January 1987, Howell attempted to gain control of Mount Carmel Center by force. George Roden had dug up the casket of Anna Hughes from the Davidian cemetery and had challenged Howell to a resurrection contest to prove who was the rightful heir to the leadership. Howell instead went to the police and claimed Roden was guilty of corpse abuse, but the county prosecutors refused to file charges without proof.

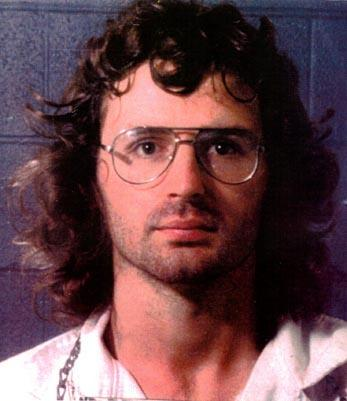
Vernon Howell (later David Koresh) in a 1987 mug shot

On November 3, 1987, Howell and seven armed companions tried to get into the Mount Carmel chapel, intending to photograph the body in the casket as incriminating evidence, even though they did not bring a camera. Roden was informed of the interlopers and opened fire. The Sheriff's Department responded about 20 minutes into the gunfight, during which Roden had been wounded. Sheriff Harwell got Howell on the phone and told him to stop shooting and surrender. Howell and his companions, dubbed the "Rodenville Eight" by the media, were tried for attempted murder on April 12, 1988. Seven were acquitted, and the jury hung on Howell's verdict. The county prosecutors did not press the case further.

Even with all the effort to bring the casket to court, the standing judge refused to use it as evidence for the case. Judge Herman Fitts ruled that the courtroom is no place for a casket when defense attorney Gary Coker requested it be used as evidence for the case. Eight men, including six of the defendants, were forced to carry the casket away from the courthouse and down the street to a van awaiting the body. In response to questions about the body, Roden admitted to attempting to resurrect Hughes on three occasions.

While waiting for the trial, Roden was put in jail under contempt of court charges because of his use of foul language in some court pleadings. He threatened the Texas court with sexually transmitted diseases if the court ruled in Howell's favor. Alongside these charges, Roden was jailed for six months for legal motions he filed with explicit language. Roden faced 90 days in jail for living on the property after being ordered to neither live on the property nor call himself the leader of the religious group in a 1979 case. Soon after the trial, several of Howell's followers moved from their headquarters in Palestine, Texas, back to Mount Carmel. In mid-1989, Roden used an axe to kill a Davidian named Wayman Dale Adair, who visited him to discuss Adair's alleged vision of being God's chosen messiah. He was found guilty under an insanity defense and was committed to a mental hospital. Shortly after Roden's commitment, Howell raised money to pay off all the taxes back on Mount Carmel owed by Roden and took legal control of the property. After these legal proceedings, it was noted in a 90-minute interview by the Davidians' attorney Douglas Wayne Martin that the religious group had been back and forth to court since 1955.

On August 5, 1989, Howell released the "New Light" audiotape, in which he said that God told him to procreate with the women in the group to establish a "House of David" of his "special people." This involved separating married couples in the group, who had to agree that only he could have sexual relations with the wives, while the men should observe celibacy. Howell also said that God had told him to start building an "Army for God" to prepare for the end of days and a salvation for his followers.

Howell filed a petition in the California State Superior Court in Pomona on May 15, 1990, to legally change his name "for publicity and business purposes" to Koresh. On August 28, he was granted the petition. By 1992, most of the land belonging to the group had been sold except for a core 77 acres (31 ha). Most of the buildings had been removed or were being salvaged for construction materials to convert much of the main chapel and a tall water tank into apartments for the resident members of the group. Many of the members of the group had been involved with the Davidians for a few generations, and many had large families.

== Prelude ==
If you are a Branch Davidian, Christ lives on a threadbare piece of land 10 miles [16 km] east of here called Mount Carmel. He has dimples, claims a ninth-grade education, married his legal wife when she was 14, enjoys a beer now and then, plays a mean guitar, reportedly packs a 9 mm Glock and keeps an arsenal of military assault rifles, and willingly admits that he is a sinner without equal.

— Opening passage of "The Sinful Messiah", Waco Tribune-Herald, February 27, 1993

On February 27, 1993, the Waco Tribune-Herald began publishing "The Sinful Messiah", a series of articles by Mark England and Darlene McCormick, who reported allegations that Koresh had physically abused children in the compound and had committed statutory rape by taking multiple underage brides. Koresh was also said to advocate polygamy for himself and declared that he was married to several female residents of the small community. The paper claimed that Koresh had announced he was entitled to at least 140 wives and that he was entitled to claim any of the women in the group as his, that he had fathered at least a dozen children, and that some of these mothers became brides as young as 12 or 13 years old.

In addition to allegations of sexual abuse and misconduct, Koresh and his followers were suspected of stockpiling illegal weapons. In May 1992, Chief Deputy Daniel Weyenberg of the McLennan County Sheriff's Department called the Bureau of Alcohol, Tobacco and Firearms (ATF) to notify them that his office had been contacted by a local UPS representative concerned about a report by a local driver. The UPS driver said a package had broken open on delivery to the Branch Davidian residence, revealing at least half a dozen grenades. He also noted that the compound had been receiving packages from an arms dealer for months.

On June 9, the ATF opened a formal investigation and a week later it was classified as sensitive, "thereby calling for a high degree of oversight" from both Houston and headquarters. The documentary Inside Waco claims that the investigation started in 1992 when the ATF became concerned over reports of automatic gunfire coming from the Carmel compound. On July 30, ATF agents David Aguilera and Skinner visited the Branch Davidians' gun dealer Henry McMahon, who tried to get them to talk with Koresh on the phone. Koresh offered to let ATF inspect the Branch Davidians' weapons and paperwork and asked to speak with Aguilera, but Aguilera declined.

Sheriff Harwell told reporters regarding law enforcement talking with Koresh, "Just go out and talk to them, what's wrong with notifying them?" The ATF began surveillance from a house across the road from the compound several months before the siege. Their cover was poor (the "college students" were in their thirties, had new cars, were not registered at the local schools, and did not keep a schedule that would have fit any legitimate employment or classes). The investigation included sending in an undercover agent, Robert Rodriguez, whose identity Koresh learned, though he only revealed that fact on the day of the raid.

== Aguilera's affidavit ==
The ATF used an affidavit filed by Special Agent David Aguilera to obtain the search and arrest warrant that led to the Waco siege. The official filing date of this affidavit was February 25, 1993. Allegedly, the initial investigation began in June 1992 when a postal worker informed a sheriff of McLennan County that he believed he had been delivering explosives to the ammo and gun store owned and operated by the Branch Davidians. This store, named the "Mag-Bag", had been identified by the postal worker as suspicious in deliveries. The worker continued deliveries to the Mt. Carmel Center and reported seeing occupied observation posts; in the affidavit, it states he believed there were armed personnel at these observation posts.

The McLennan county sheriff was notified in May and June of that year of two cases of inert grenades, black gunpowder, 90 pounds of powdered aluminum, and 30–40 cardboard tubes. Aguilera also noted that the Mag-Bag had purchased several AR-15/M-16 parts kits. Some of the sellers of these kits were under investigation at that time by the ATF, and the ATF had seized illegal weapons from their previous customers. Aguilera stated, "I have been involved in many cases where defendants, following a relatively simple process, convert AR-15 semi-automatic rifles to fully automatic rifles of the nature of the M-16" to justify the ATF's involvement in the case.

In November 1992, a local farmer (Ben Hays) and his wife (Cameron Krejeci) reported to the sheriff that he had heard machine-gun fire. "By the sound of it," he said, "it was likely a .50 caliber machine gun and multiple M-16s." Hays claimed he was very familiar with machine guns, having done a tour overseas in the US Army. The affidavit closed with Aguilera verifying the story via interviews made with associated parties and gun shops from which the Mag-Bag purchased items. Among these items were over forty-five AR-15 upper receivers and five M-16 upper receivers, which Aguilera annotated, "These kits contain all the parts of an M-16 except for the lower receiver unit, which is the 'firearm' by lawful definition," admitting that neither the noise nor the items ordered were necessarily illegal. The ArmaLite AR-15, which the M16 rifle was adapted from, also has the designation for its serialized part on the lower receiver to comply with the National Firearms Act.

== ATF raid ==
=== Preparations ===
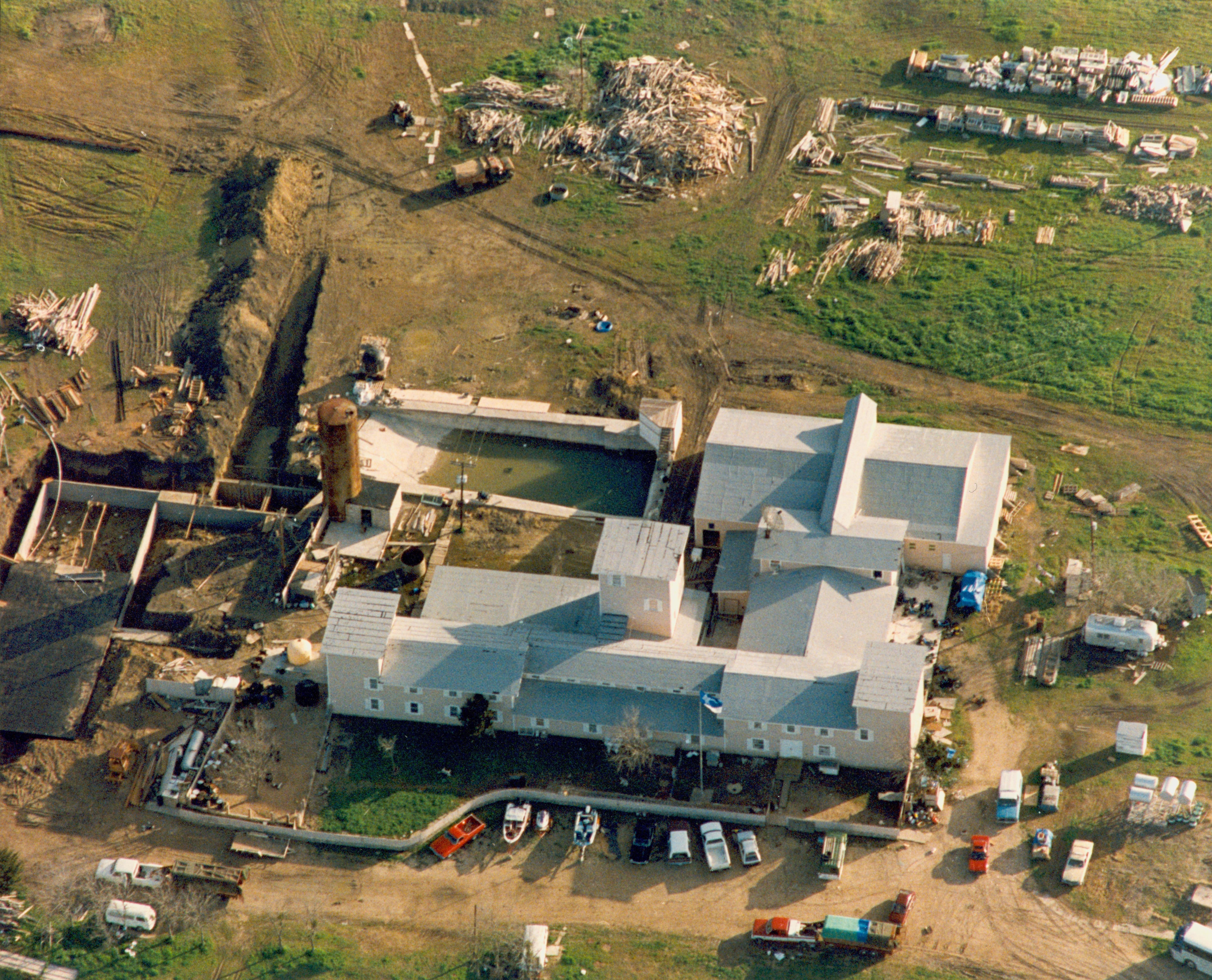
The Branch Davidian compound (Mount Carmel Center) photographed during the siege

Using the affidavit filed by Aguilera that alleged that the Davidians had violated federal law, the ATF obtained search and arrest warrants for Koresh and specific followers on weapons charges, citing the many firearms they had accumulated. The search warrant commanded a search "on or before February 28, 1993", in the daytime between 6:00 am and 10:00 pm. The ATF made a claim that Koresh was possibly operating a methamphetamine lab, allowing them to obtain military assets under the war on drugs. ATF ultimately received only a training site, medical equipment, and communications support, not combat assets. Although the ATF's investigation "focused on firearm violations, not on illegal drugs", the ATF requested assistance from the Drug Enforcement Administration (DEA) and the United States Department of Defense (DOD) "citing a drug connection" based on 1) a recent delivery to the compound of "chemicals, instruments, and glassware", 2) a written testimony from a former compound resident, alleging "Howell had told him that drug trafficking was a desirable way to raise money", 3) several current residents who "had prior drug involvement", 4) two former residents who were incarcerated for drug-trafficking crimes, and 5) National Guard overflights' thermal images showing a "hot spot inside the compound, possibly indicating a methamphetamine laboratory". The original request for assistance was initially approved, but the commander of the Special Forces detachment questioned it, and the ATF obtained only a training site at Fort Hood, Texas, from February 25 to February 27 with safety inspections for the training lanes, and was given only medical and communications training and equipment.

The ATF had planned their raid for Monday, March 1, 1993, with the code name "Showtime". The ATF later claimed that the raid was moved up a day, to February 28, 1993, in response to the Waco Tribune-Herald's "The Sinful Messiah" series of articles (which the ATF had tried to prevent from being published). Beginning February 1, ATF agents had three meetings with Tribune-Herald staff regarding a delay in publication of "The Sinful Messiah". The paper was first told by the ATF that the raid would take place February 22, which they changed to March 1, and then ultimately to an indefinite date. ATF agents felt the newspaper had held off publication at the request of the ATF for at least three weeks. In a February 24 meeting between Tribune-Herald staff and ATF agent Phillip Chojancki and two other agents, the ATF could not give the newspaper staff a clear idea of what action was planned or when. The Tribune-Herald informed ATF they were publishing the series, which included an editorial calling for local authorities to act. Personnel of the Tribune-Herald found out about the imminent raid after the first installment of "The Sinful Messiah" had already appeared on February 27.

The ATF preferred to arrest Koresh when he was outside Mount Carmel, but planners received inaccurate information that Koresh rarely left it. The Branch Davidian members were well known locally and had cordial relations with other locals. The Branch Davidians partly supported themselves by trading at gun shows and took care to have the relevant paperwork to ensure their transactions were legal. Branch Davidian Paul Fatta was a federal firearms licensed dealer, and the group operated a retail gun business called the Mag-Bag. When shipments for the Mag-Bag arrived, they were signed for by Fatta, Steve Schneider, or Koresh. The morning of the raid, Paul Fatta and his son Kalani were on their way to an Austin gun show to conduct business.

=== February 28 ===
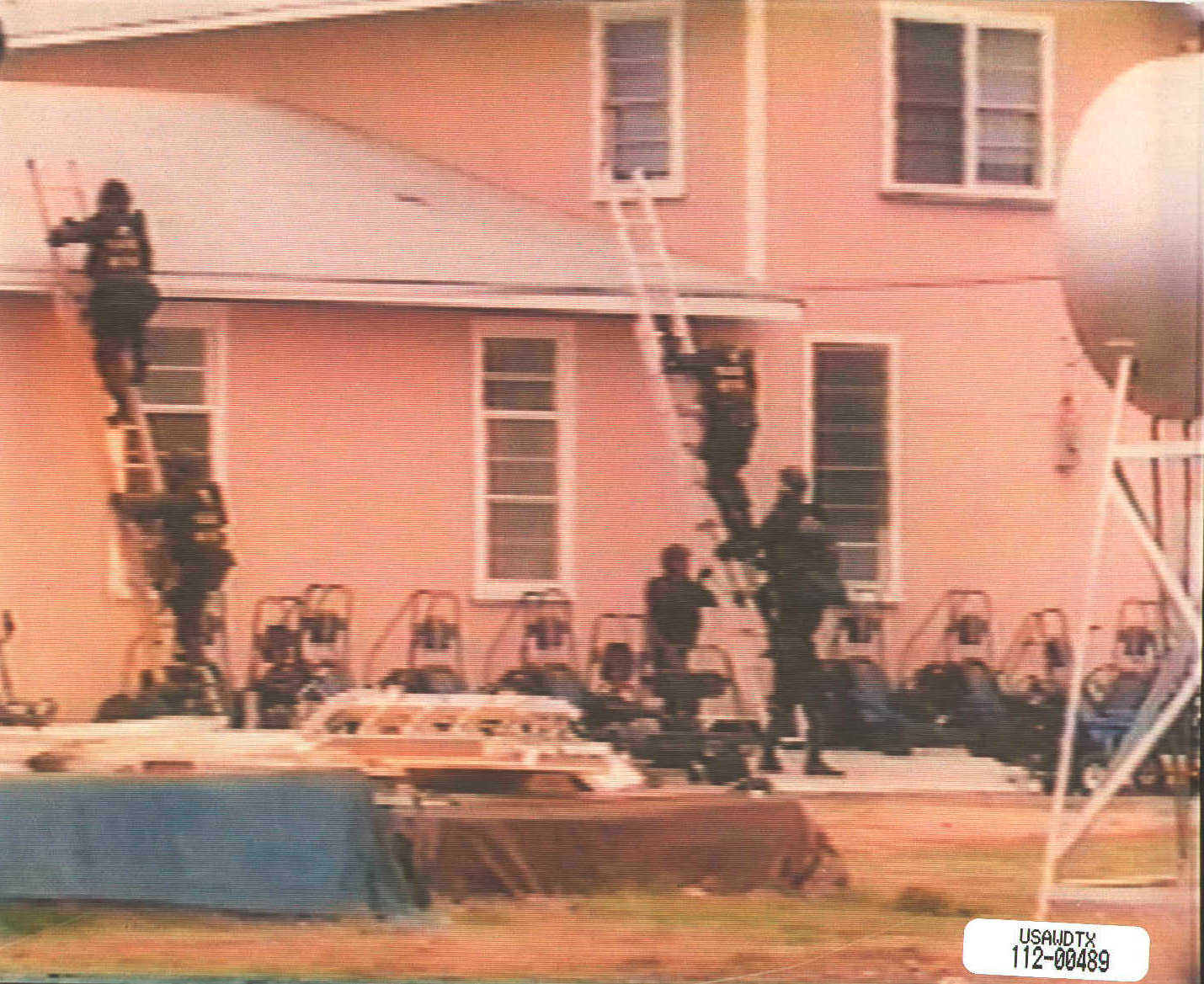
ATF agents attempting to enter the Branch Davidian compound on February 28, 1993

The ATF attempted to execute their search warrant on Sunday morning, February 28, 1993. The local sheriff, in audiotapes broadcast after the incident, said he was not told about the raid — despite the fact that a member of his own department's support staff was embedded with the ATF raid preparation team and is believed to have been the source of the media leak that ultimately cost the operation its element of surprise. Despite being informed that the Branch Davidians knew a raid was coming, the ATF commander ordered that it go ahead, even though their plan depended on reaching the compound without the Branch Davidians being armed and prepared.

Any advantage of surprise was lost when a KWTX-TV reporter who had been tipped off about the raid asked for directions from a US Postal Service mail carrier who was coincidentally Koresh's brother-in-law. Koresh then told undercover ATF agent Robert Rodriguez that they knew a raid was imminent. Rodriguez had infiltrated the Branch Davidians and was astonished to find that his cover had been blown. The agent made an excuse and left the compound. When asked later what the Branch Davidians had been doing when he left the compound, Rodriguez replied, "They were praying." Branch Davidian survivors have written that Koresh ordered selected male followers to begin arming and taking up defensive positions, while the women and children were told to take cover in their rooms. Koresh told them he would try to speak to the agents, and what happened next would depend on the agents' intentions. The ATF arrived at 9:45 am in a convoy of civilian vehicles containing uniformed personnel in SWAT-style tactical gear.

The question of who fired first has never been definitively resolved. ATF agents who participated in the raid testified in court, and at congressional hearings, that the Branch Davidians fired first. However, shortly after the raid, one ATF agent told investigators that a fellow agent may have shot first when killing a dog outside the compound. Roland Ballesteros, one of the first ATF agents out of the cattle trucks, told Texas Rangers and Waco police shortly after the raid that he thought the first shots came from agents aiming at the Davidians' dogs. Three helicopters of the Army National Guard were used as an aerial distraction, and all took incoming fire. During the first shots, Koresh was wounded, shot in the hand and the stomach. Within a minute of the raid's start, Branch Davidian Wayne Martin called emergency services, pleading for them to stop shooting. Martin asked for a ceasefire, and audiotapes record him saying, "Here they come again!" and, "That's them shooting! That's not us!"

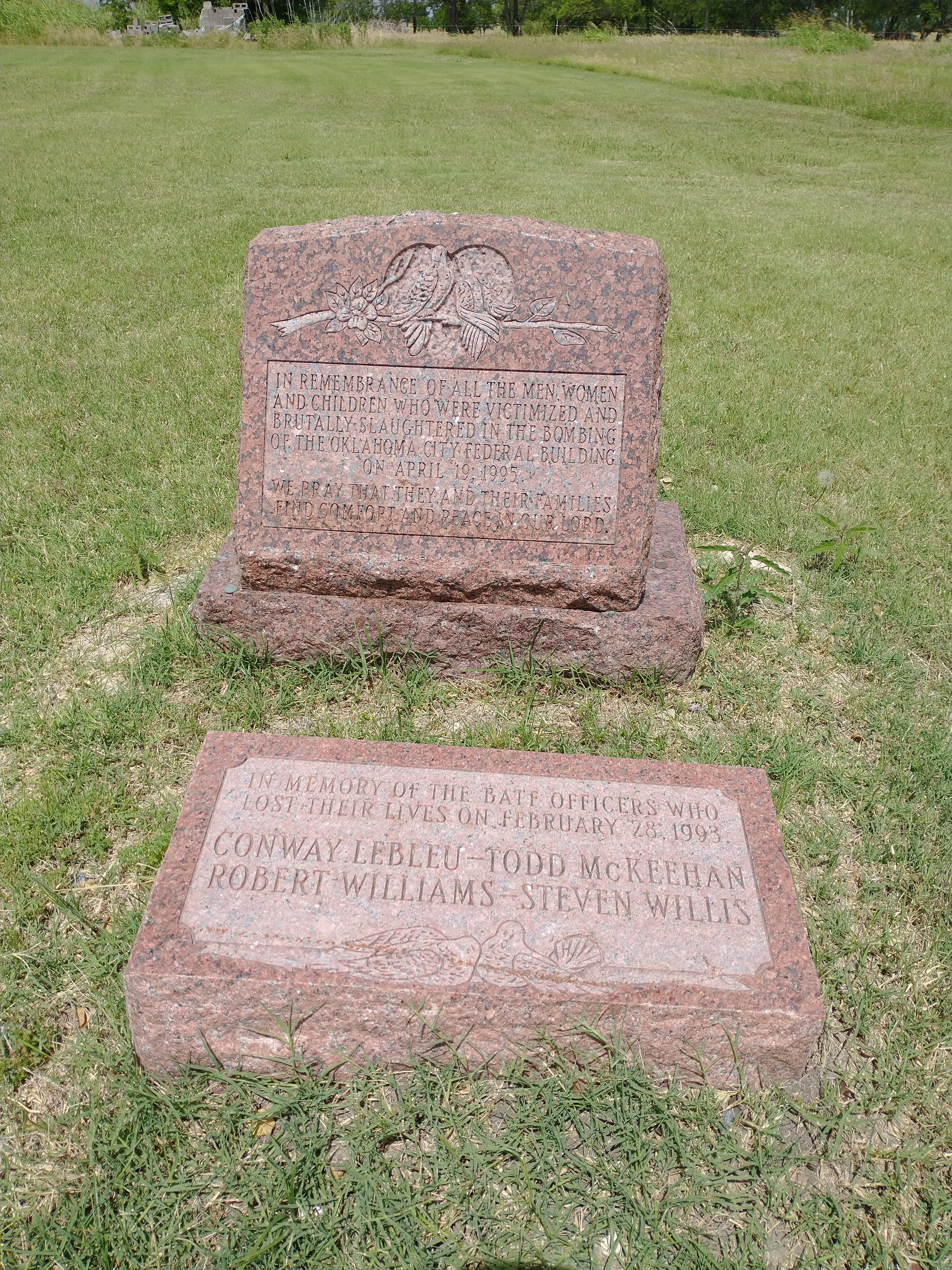
A memorial to the four ATF agents killed in the February 28 raid on the compound

The first ATF casualty was an agent who had made it to the west side of the building before he was wounded. Agents quickly took cover and fired at the buildings while the helicopters began their diversion and swept in low over the complex, 350 feet (105 m) away from the building. The Branch Davidians fired on the helicopters and hit them. None of the crewmembers were injured, but the helicopter pilots pulled away from the compound and landed. On the east side of the compound, agents put two ladders against the side of the building. They then climbed onto the roof to secure it and reach Koresh's room and the location where they believed weapons were stored. On the west slope of the roof, three agents reached Koresh's window and were crouching beside it when they came under fire. One agent was killed and another wounded. The third agent clambered over the peak of the roof and joined other agents attempting to enter the armory. The window was smashed, a flashbang stun grenade was thrown in, and three agents entered the armory. When another tried to follow them, a hail of bullets penetrated the wall and wounded him, but he was able to reach a ladder and slide to safety. An agent fired his shotgun at Branch Davidians until he was hit in the head by return fire and killed. Inside the armory, the agents killed a Branch Davidian and discovered a cache of weapons, but subsequently came under heavy fire; two were wounded. As they escaped, the third agent laid down covering fire, killing a Branch Davidian. As he made his escape, he hit his head on a wooden support beam and fell off the roof but survived. An agent outside provided them with covering fire but was shot by a Branch Davidian and killed instantly. Dozens of ATF agents took cover, many behind Branch Davidian vehicles, and exchanged fire with the Branch Davidians. The number of ATF wounded increased, and an agent was killed by gunfire from the compound as agents were firing at a Branch Davidian perched on top of the water tower. The exchange of fire continued, but 45 minutes into the raid the gunfire began to slow down as agents began to run low on ammunition. The shooting continued for a total of two hours.

Lieutenant Lynch of the McLennan County Sheriff Department contacted the ATF and negotiated a ceasefire. Sheriff Harwell states in William Gazecki's documentary Waco: The Rules of Engagement that the ATF agents withdrew only after they were out of ammunition. ATF agent Chuck Hustmyre later wrote: "About 45 minutes into the shootout, the volume of gunfire finally started to slacken. We were running out of ammunition. The Davidians, however, had plenty." In all, four ATF agents (Steve Willis, Robert Williams, Todd McKeehan, and Conway Charles LeBleu) had been killed during the firefight. Another 16 had been injured. After the ceasefire, the Branch Davidians allowed the ATF dead and wounded to be evacuated and held their fire during the ATF retreat.

The five Branch Davidians killed in the raid were Winston Blake, Peter Gent, Peter Hipsman, Perry Jones, and Jaydean Wendell; two were killed by the Branch Davidians after having been wounded. Their bodies were buried on the grounds. Nearly six hours after the 11:30 am ceasefire, Michael Schroeder was shot dead by ATF agents who alleged he fired a pistol at agents as he attempted to re-enter the compound with Woodrow Kendrick and Norman Allison.

Alan A. Stone's report states that the Branch Davidians did not ambush the ATF and that they "apparently did not maximize the kill of ATF agents", explaining that they were rather "desperate religious fanatics expecting an apocalyptic ending, in which they were destined to die defending their sacred ground and destined to achieve salvation." A 1999 federal report noted:

The violent tendencies of dangerous cults can be classified into two general categories—defensive violence and offensive violence. Defensive violence is utilized by cults to defend a compound or enclave that was created specifically to eliminate most contact with the dominant culture. The 1993 clash in Waco, Texas at the Branch Davidian complex is an illustration of such defensive violence. History has shown that groups that seek to withdraw from the dominant culture seldom act on their beliefs that the endtime has come unless provoked.

== FBI siege ==
ATF agents established contact with Koresh and others inside the compound after they withdrew. The FBI took command soon after as a result of the deaths of federal agents, placing Jeff Jamar, head of the Bureau's San Antonio field office, in charge of the siege as Site Commander. The FBI Hostage Rescue Team (HRT) was headed by HRT Commander Richard Rogers, who had previously been criticized for his actions during the Ruby Ridge incident. As at Ruby Ridge, Rogers often overrode the Site Commander at Waco and had mobilized both the Blue and Gold HRT tactical teams to the same site, which ultimately created pressure to resolve the situation tactically due to lack of HRT reserves.

At first, the Davidians had telephone contact with local news media, and Koresh gave phone interviews. The FBI then cut Davidian communication to the outside world. For the next 51 days, communication with those inside was by telephone by a group of 25 FBI negotiators. The final Justice Department report found that negotiators criticized the tactical commanders for undercutting negotiations.

In the first few days, the FBI believed they had made a breakthrough when they negotiated with Koresh an agreement that the Branch Davidians would peacefully leave the compound in return for a message, recorded by Koresh, being broadcast on national radio. The broadcast was made, but Koresh then told negotiators that God had told him to remain in the building and "wait". Despite this, soon afterwards negotiators managed to facilitate the release of 19 children, ranging in age from five months to 12 years old, without their parents. However, 98 people remained in the building. The children were interviewed by the FBI and Texas Rangers, some for hours at a time. Allegedly, the children had been physically and sexually abused long before the standoff. This was the key justification offered by the FBI (both to then President Bill Clinton and to Attorney General Janet Reno) for launching CS gas attacks to force the Branch Davidians out of the compound.

During the siege, the FBI sent a video camera to the Branch Davidians. In the videotape made by Koresh's followers, Koresh introduced his children and his "wives" to the FBI negotiators, including several minors who claimed to have had babies fathered by Koresh; he had fathered perhaps 14 of the children who stayed with him in the compound. Several Branch Davidians made statements in the video. On day nine, Monday, March 8, the Branch Davidians sent out the videotape to show the FBI that there were no hostages, but everyone was staying inside on their own free will. This video also included a message from Koresh.

The negotiators' log showed that when the video was reviewed, there was concern that its release to the media would gain sympathy for Koresh and the Branch Davidians. Videos also showed the 23 children still inside the compound, and child care professionals on the outside prepared to take care of those children as well as the previous 19 released. As the siege continued, Koresh negotiated for more time, allegedly so that he could write religious documents he needed to complete before surrendering. His conversations, which were dense with Biblical imagery, alienated the federal negotiators, who treated the situation as a hostage crisis. Among themselves, the negotiation teams took to calling Koresh's words "Bible babble."

On March 7, the FBI began consulting with Bible scholars Phillip Arnold and James Tabor, who studied a transcript of Koresh's radio broadcast to try to understand his theology. That week, Arnold and Tabor were guests on talk radio programs on Dallas radio stations KRLB and KGBS. Koresh heard the programs on a battery-powered radio. On March 16, he asked the FBI for permission to discuss the Bible with Arnold directly. The FBI denied this request.

On April 1, Arnold and Tabor were interviewed by radio talk show host Ron Engleman on KGBS to discuss the situation. Tabor said that the Apostle Paul wrote much of the New Testament from prison and, in a similar manner, Koresh's message would reach a wider audience if he surrendered peacefully, even if it meant going to prison. On April 4, a tape recording of this broadcast was delivered to Koresh by Dick DeGuerin, Koresh's lawyer. According to David Thibodeau, an eyewitness inside the compound, Koresh responded favorably to the tape.

As the siege wore on, two factions developed within the FBI, one believing negotiation to be the answer, and the other, force. Increasingly aggressive techniques were used to try to force the Branch Davidians out, for instance, sleep deprivation of the inhabitants through all-night broadcasts of recordings of jet planes, pop music, Buddhist chanting, and the screams of rabbits being slaughtered. Outside the compound, nine M3 Bradley infantry fighting vehicles carrying M651 CS tear gas grenades and ferret rounds, and five M728 Combat Engineer Vehicles obtained from the US Army began patrolling. The armored vehicles were used to destroy perimeter fencing and outbuildings and crush cars belonging to the Branch Davidians. Armored vehicles repeatedly drove over the grave of Peter Gent despite protests by the Branch Davidians and the negotiators.

Two of the three water storage tanks on the roof of the main building had been damaged during the initial ATF raid. Eventually, the FBI cut all power and water to the compound, forcing those inside to survive on rainwater and stockpiled military MRE rations. Criticism was later leveled by Schneider's attorney, Jack Zimmerman, at the tactic of using sleep-and-peace-disrupting sound against the Branch Davidians: "The point was this—they were trying to have sleep disturbance and they were trying to take someone that they viewed as unstable to start with, and they were trying to drive him crazy. And then they got mad 'cos he does something that they think is irrational!"

Despite the increasingly aggressive tactics, Koresh ordered a group of followers to leave. Eleven people left and were arrested as material witnesses, with one person charged with conspiracy to murder. The children's willingness to stay with Koresh disturbed the negotiators, who were unprepared to work around the Branch Davidians' religious zeal. The children were aware that an earlier group of children who had left with some women were immediately separated, and the women arrested.

During the siege, several scholars who study apocalypticism in religious groups attempted to persuade the FBI that the siege tactics being used by government agents would only reinforce the impression within the Branch Davidians that they were part of a Biblical "end-of-times" confrontation that had cosmic significance. This would likely increase the chances of a violent and deadly outcome. The religious scholars pointed out that the beliefs of the group may have appeared to be extreme, but to the Branch Davidians, their religious beliefs were deeply meaningful, and they were willing to die for them.

Koresh's discussions with the negotiating team became increasingly difficult. He proclaimed that he was the Second Coming of Christ and had been commanded by his father in heaven to remain in the compound. From April 5 until April 13, Koresh refused to speak to the FBI, citing observance of the Passover holiday. FBI planners, growing increasingly impatient, considered using snipers to kill Koresh and other key Branch Davidians. The FBI voiced concern that the Branch Davidians might commit mass suicide, as had happened in 1978 at Jim Jones' Jonestown complex. Koresh had repeatedly denied any plans for mass suicide when confronted by negotiators during the standoff, and people leaving the compound had not seen any such preparation.

On April 14, Koresh released a letter to his lawyer, Dick Deguerin, that was his last communication with the outside world. In it, he claimed to be writing down an interpretation of the seven seals of the Book of Revelation, promising to exit the compound as soon as it was completed:

I want the people of this generation to be saved. I am working night and day to complete my final work of the writing out of these Seals. I thank my Father. He has finally granted me the chance to do this. It will bring New Light and hope to many and they will not have to deal with me the person. I will demand the first manuscript of the Seals be given to you. Many scholars and religious leaders will wish to have copies for examination. I will keep a copy with me. As soon as I can see that people like Jim Tabor and Phil Arnold have a copy I will come out and then you can do your thing with this beast.

This letter sparked immediate disagreement within the FBI. While some saw it as a breakthrough, others ridiculed it, suspecting it to be a delay tactic to buy Koresh time to prepare for a violent confrontation. The FBI consulted psychologist Murray Miron of Syracuse University to understand Koresh's mental state. After examining this and four other letters by Koresh, Miron wrote in an April 15 report that he exhibited "all the hallmarks of rampant, morbidly virulent paranoia" concluding "I do not believe there is in these writings any better, or at least certain, hope for an early end to the siege."

== Final assault and the burning of the Mount Carmel Center ==
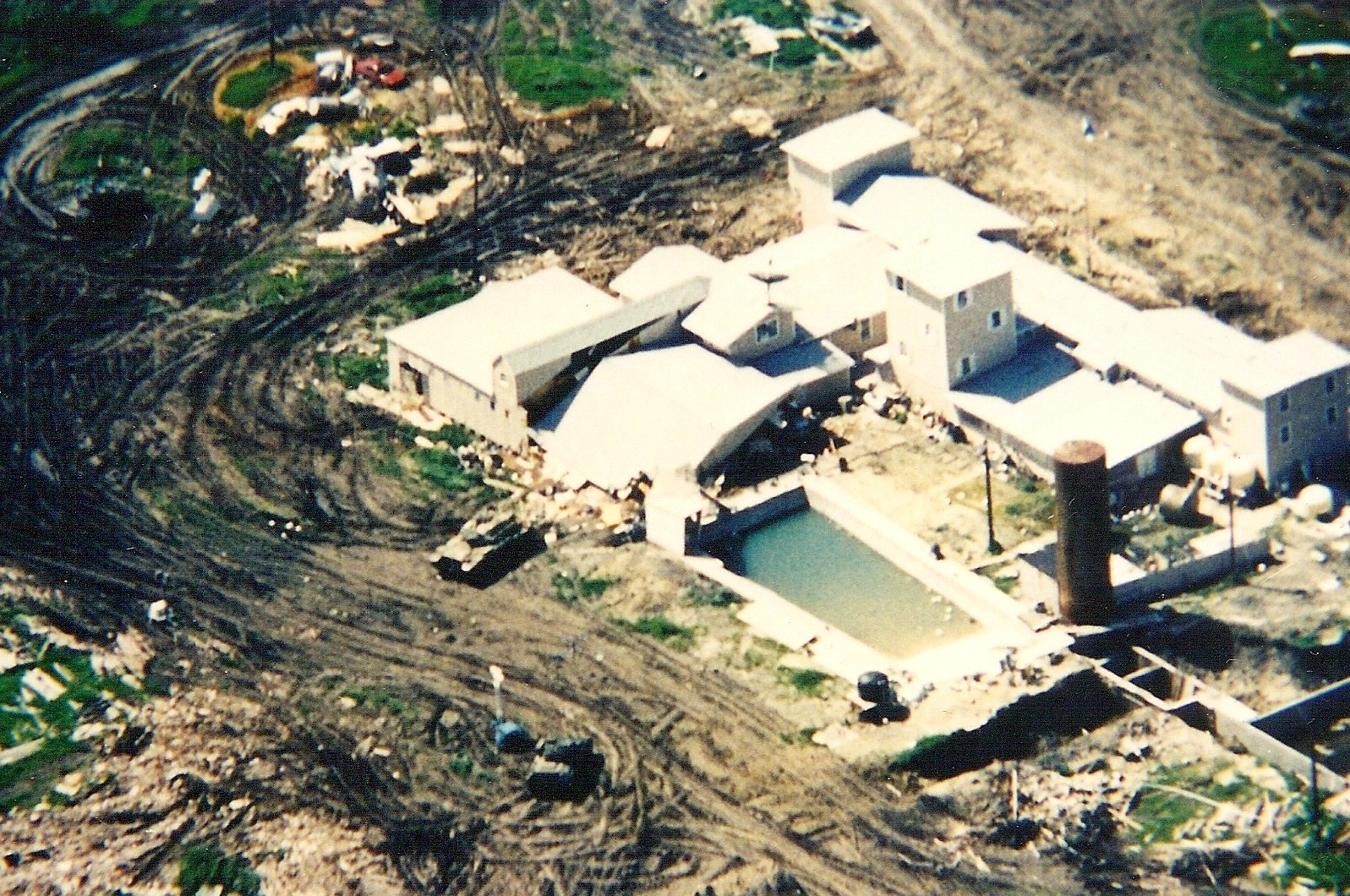
An M728 Combat Engineer Vehicle brings down the back wall and roof of the Mount Carmel gymnasium.

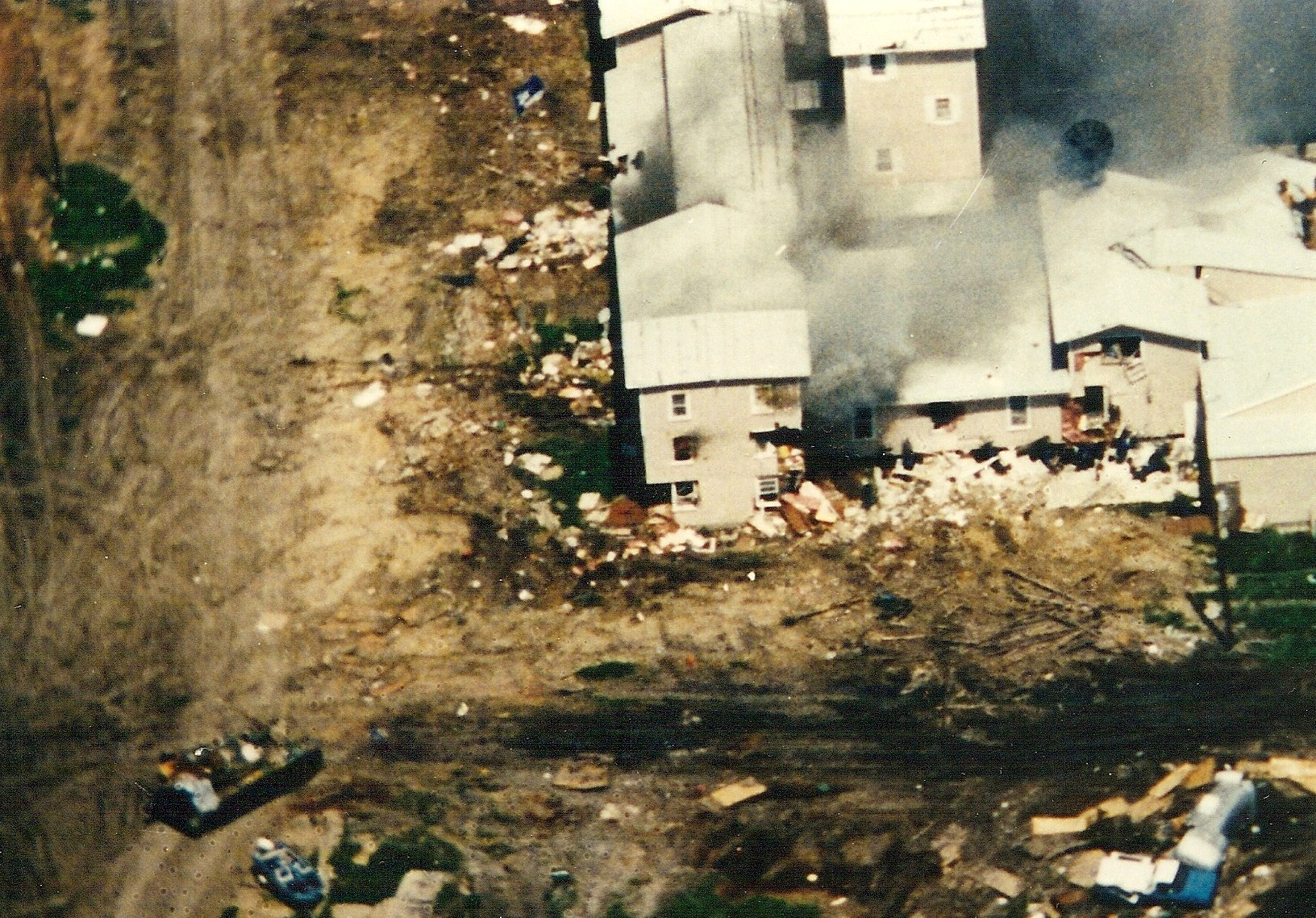
Smoke rising from the compound

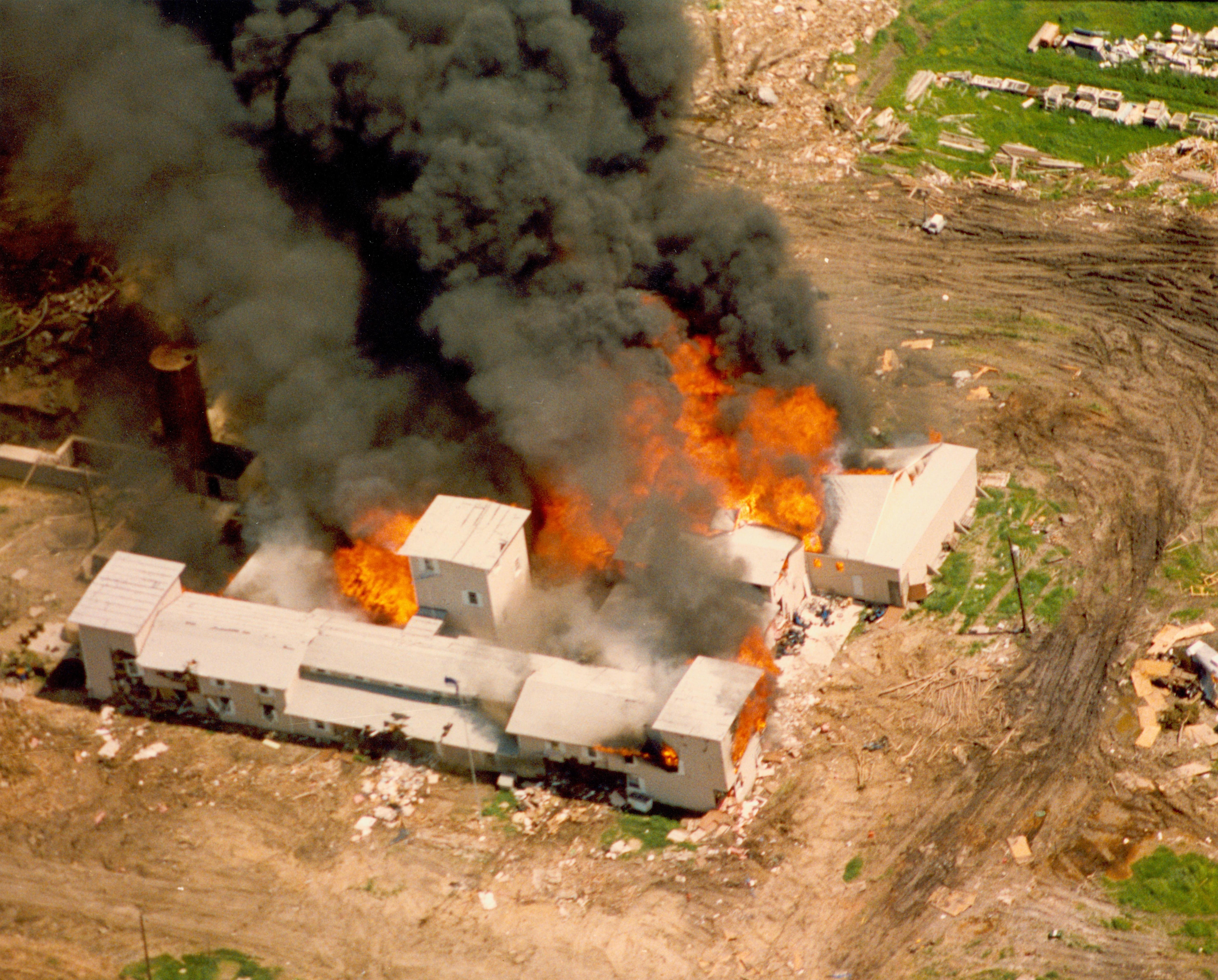
The compound almost fully engulfed in flames

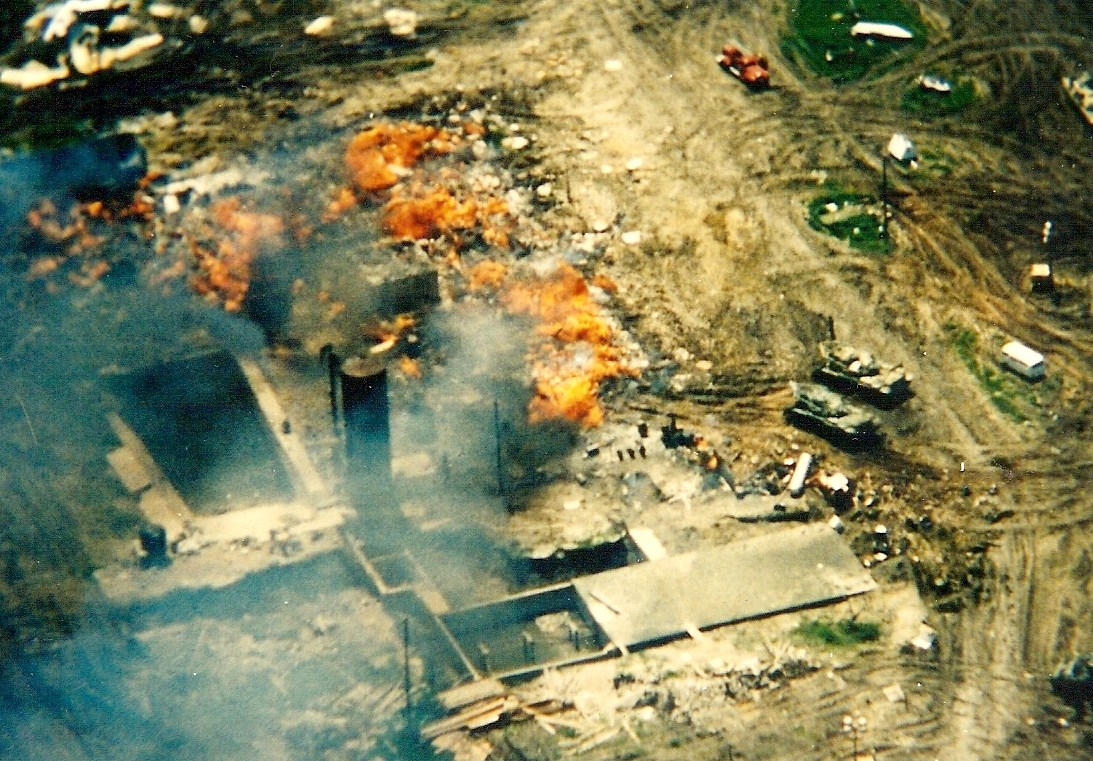
The last remnants of the razed Mount Carmel Center burn down.

Newly appointed US Attorney General Janet Reno approved recommendations by the FBI Hostage Rescue Team to mount an assault, after being told that conditions were deteriorating and that children were being abused inside the compound. Reno made the FBI's case to Clinton. Recalling the April 19, 1985, The Covenant, The Sword, and the Arm of the Lord (CSA) siege in Arkansas (which was ended without loss of life by a blockade without a deadline), Clinton suggested similar tactics against the Branch Davidians. Reno countered that the FBI Hostage Rescue Team was tired of waiting; that the standoff was costing a million dollars per week; that the Branch Davidians could hold out longer than the CSA; and that the chances of child sexual abuse and mass suicide were imminent. Clinton later recounted: "Finally, I told her that if she thought it was the right thing to do, she could go ahead." Over the next months, Reno's reason for approving the final CS gas attack varied from her initial claim that the FBI Hostage Rescue Team had told her that Koresh was sexually abusing children and beating babies (the FBI Hostage Rescue Team later denied evidence of child abuse during the standoff) to her claim that Linda Thompson's "Unorganized Militia of the United States" was on the way to Waco "either to help Koresh or to attack him."

The assault took place on April 19, 1993. Because the Branch Davidians were heavily armed, the FBI Hostage Rescue Team's arms included .50 caliber (12.7 mm) rifles and armored Combat Engineering Vehicles (CEV). The CEVs used explosives to punch holes in the walls of buildings of the compound so they could pump in CS gas (tear gas) and try to force the Branch Davidians out without harming them. The stated plan called for increasing amounts of gas to be pumped in over two days to increase pressure. Officially, no armed assault was to be made. Regarding the initial plan to tear gas the building, the spokesperson of the FBI Carl Stern claimed that input was taken from psychologists, psychiatrists, behavioral specialists, as well as, "scientific, medical stuff". Loudspeakers were to be used to tell the Branch Davidians that there would be no armed assault and to ask them not to fire on the vehicles. According to the FBI, the Hostage Rescue Team agents had been permitted to return any incoming fire, but no shots were fired by federal agents on April 19. When several Branch Davidians opened fire, the FBI Hostage Rescue Team's response was to increase the amount of gas being used. An anonymous official claimed that the reason for the FBI's increased aggression was bureau audio listening equipment inside the compound; this claim was neither corroborated nor denied by FBI Director William Sessions.

The FBI Hostage Rescue Team delivered 40-millimeter (1.6 in) Ferret brand CS gas rounds via M79 grenade launchers. Very early in the morning, the FBI Hostage Rescue Team fired two military M651 CS gas rounds at the Branch Davidian construction site. Around mid-morning, the FBI Hostage Rescue Team began to run low on 40 mm Ferret CS rounds and asked Texas Ranger Captain David Byrnes for CS gas rounds. The rounds procured from Company "F" in Waco turned out to be unusable pyrotechnics and were returned to Company "F". 40 mm munitions recovered by the Texas Rangers at Waco included dozens of plastic Ferret Model SGA-400 Liquid CS rounds, two metal M651E1 military pyrotechnic CS gas rounds, two metal NICO Pyrotechnik sound and flash grenades, and parachute illumination flares. After more than six hours, no Branch Davidians had left the building, sheltering instead in an underground concrete block room ("the bunker") within the building or using gas masks.

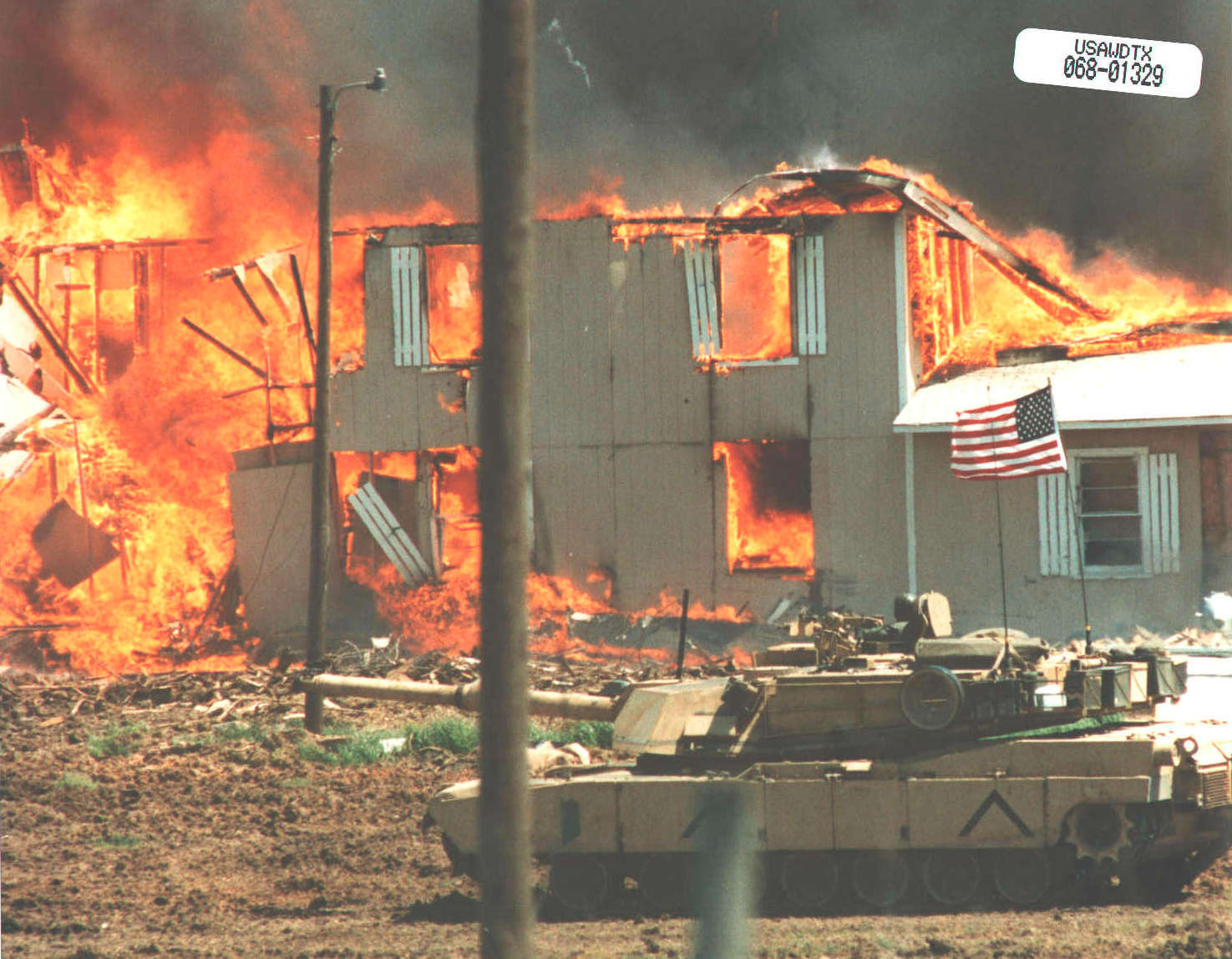
An M1 Abrams tank, operated by the FBI, in front of the burning building

At around noon, three fires broke out almost simultaneously in different parts of the building and spread quickly; footage of them was broadcast live by television crews. The government maintains the fires were deliberately started by the Branch Davidians. Some Branch Davidian survivors and other experts hold that the fires were accidentally or deliberately started by the assault, possibly by the pyrotechnic rounds used by the FBI.

Nine people left the building during the fire. The remaining Branch Davidians, including the children, were either buried alive by rubble, suffocated, or shot. Many were killed by smoke or carbon monoxide inhalation and other causes as fire engulfed the building. According to the FBI, Steve Schneider—Koresh's top aide—shot and killed Koresh and then himself. In all, 76 people died. A large concentration of bodies, weapons, and ammunition was found in "the bunker" storage room. The Texas Rangers' arson investigator report assumes that many of the occupants were either denied escape from within or refused to leave until escape was not an option. It also mentions that the structural debris from the breaching operations on the west end of the building could have blocked a possible escape route through the tunnel system. An independent investigation by two experts from the University of Maryland's Department of Fire Protection Engineering concluded that the compound residents had sufficient time to escape the fire, if they had wanted.

Autopsies of the dead revealed that some women and children—those whose remains were found beneath a fallen concrete wall of a storage room—had died of skull injuries. The US Department of Justice report indicated that only one body had traces of benzene, one of the components of solvent-dispersed CS gas, but that the gas insertions had finished nearly an hour before the fire started, and that it was enough time for solvents to dissipate from the bodies of the Branch Davidians that had inhaled the gas. Autopsy records also indicate that at least 20 Branch Davidians were shot, including David Koresh, and that five children under the age of 14 were shot. Three-year-old Dayland Gent was stabbed in the chest. The medical examiner who performed the autopsies believed these deaths were mercy killings by the Branch Davidians trapped in the fire with no escape. The expert retained by the US Office of Special Counsel concluded that many of the gunshot wounds "support self-destruction either by overt suicide, consensual execution (suicide by proxy), or less likely, forced execution."

=== Chronology of the events of April 19 ===
Time	Event
05:50	Agents call the Branch Davidian compound to warn they are going to begin tank activity and advise residents "to take cover". Agents say the Branch Davidian who answered the phone did not reply but instead threw the phone and phone line out of the front door.
05:55	The FBI Hostage Rescue Team deploys two armored CEVs to the buildings. CEV1 goes to the left of the buildings, CEV2 to the right.
06:00	FBI surveillance tapes from devices planted in the wall of the building record a man inside the compound saying "Everybody wake up, let's start to pray", then, "Pablo, have you poured it yet?" ..."Huh?" ..."Have you poured it yet?" ..."In the hallway" ..."Things are poured, right?" CEV1 receives orders to spray two bottles of CS gas into left corner of building.
06:05	Armored vehicle with ram and delivery device to pump CS gas into building with pressurized air rips into front wall just left of front door, leaving a hole 8 feet (2.4 m) high and 10 feet (3.0 m) wide. Agents claimed the holes allowed insertion of the gas as well as a means of escape. Agent sees shots from inside the compound directed at CEVs.
06:10	FBI surveillance tapes record "Don't pour it all out, we might need some later" and "Throw the tear gas back out." FBI negotiator Byron Sage is recorded saying "It's time for people to come out." Surveillance tapes record a man saying "What?", and then "No way."
06:12	FBI surveillance tapes record Branch Davidians saying "They're gonna kill us", then "They don't want to kill us."
06:31	The entire building is gassed.
06:47	The FBI Hostage Rescue Team fires plastic, non-incendiary CS gas rounds through windows.
07:23	FBI surveillance tapes record a male Branch Davidian saying, "The fuel has to go all around to get started." Then a second male says, "Well, there are two cans here, if that's poured soon."
07:30	CEV1 is redeployed, breaching the building and inserting CS gas. Branch Davidians fire shots at CEV1.
07:45–07:48:52	On FBI tapes of agents recorded during the siege, an FBI Hostage Rescue Team agent requests permission to fire military tear gas rounds to break through an underground concrete bunker. This permission is granted.
07:58	CEV2, with battering ram, rips a hole into second floor of compound; minutes later another hole is punched into the rear of one of the buildings of the compound. The vehicles then withdraw.
08:08	Three pyrotechnic military tear gas rounds are shot at the concrete construction pit (not the concrete bunker), away and downwind from the main quarters, trying to penetrate the structure, but they bounce off. An agent in the CEV reports that one shell bounced off the bunker and did not penetrate. These are the only military tear gas rounds to be fired by the FBI.
08:24	The audio portion of FBI videotape ends, at the request of the pilot.
09:00	The Branch Davidians unfurl a banner that reads "We want our phone fixed."
09:13	CEV1 breaks through the front door to deliver more gas.
09:20	FBI surveillance records a meeting starting at 7:30 am between several unidentified males. UM: "They got two cans of Coleman fuel down there? Huh?" UM: "Empty." UM: "All of it?" UM: "Nothing left."
10:00	A man is seen waving a white flag on the southeast side of the compound. He is advised over loudspeakers that if he is surrendering he should come out. He does not. At the same time, a man believed to be Steve Schneider comes out from the remains of the front door to retrieve the phone and phone line.
11:30	The original CEV2 has mechanical difficulties (damaged tread); its replacement breaches the back side of compound.
11:17–12:04	According to the government, a series of remarks such as "I want a fire", "Keep that fire going", and "Do you think I could light this soon?" indicate that the Branch Davidians have started setting fire to the complex around 11:30. Surviving Branch Davidians testified that Coleman fuel had been poured, and fire experts in Danforth's report agree "without question" that people inside the complex had started multiple accelerated fires.
11:43	Another gas insertion takes place, with the armored vehicle moving well into the building on the right rear side to reach the concrete interior room where the FBI Hostage Rescue Team believe the Branch Davidians are trying to avoid the gas.
11:45	The wall on the right rear side of the building collapses.
12:03	An armored vehicle turret knocks away the first floor corner on the right side.
12:07	The first visible flames appear in two spots in the front of the building, first on the left of the front door on the second floor (a wisp of smoke then a small flicker of flame), then a short time later on the far right side of the front of the building, and at a third spot on the backside. An FBI Hostage Rescue Team agent reported seeing a Branch Davidian member igniting a fire in the front door area.
12:09	Ruth Riddle exits with a floppy disk in her jacket containing Koresh's Manuscript on the Seven Seals. A third fire is detected on first floor.
12:10	Flames spread quickly through the building, fanned by high winds and the openings created by the FBI. The building burns very quickly.
12:12	No fire trucks were on site so an emergency call is placed regarding the fire. Two Waco Fire Department trucks are dispatched. Shortly after, the Bellmead Fire Department dispatches two trucks.
12:22	Waco fire trucks arrive at the checkpoint, where they are halted (not being allowed to pass until 12:37); Bellmead follows shortly after.
12:25	There is a large explosion on the left side of the compound. This was later determined to have been a boiling liquid expanding vapor explosion (BLEVE) from an LPG cylinder. One object hurtles into the air, bounces off the top of a bus, and lands on the grass.
12:30	Part of the roof collapses. Around this time, there are several further explosions, and witnesses report the sound of gunfire, attributed by the FBI Hostage Rescue Team to live ammunition cooking off throughout the buildings because of the fire.
12:43	According to fire department logs, fire trucks arrive at the compound.
12:55	Fire begins to burn out. The entire compound is leveled.
15:45	A law enforcement source states that Koresh is dead.

== Aftermath ==
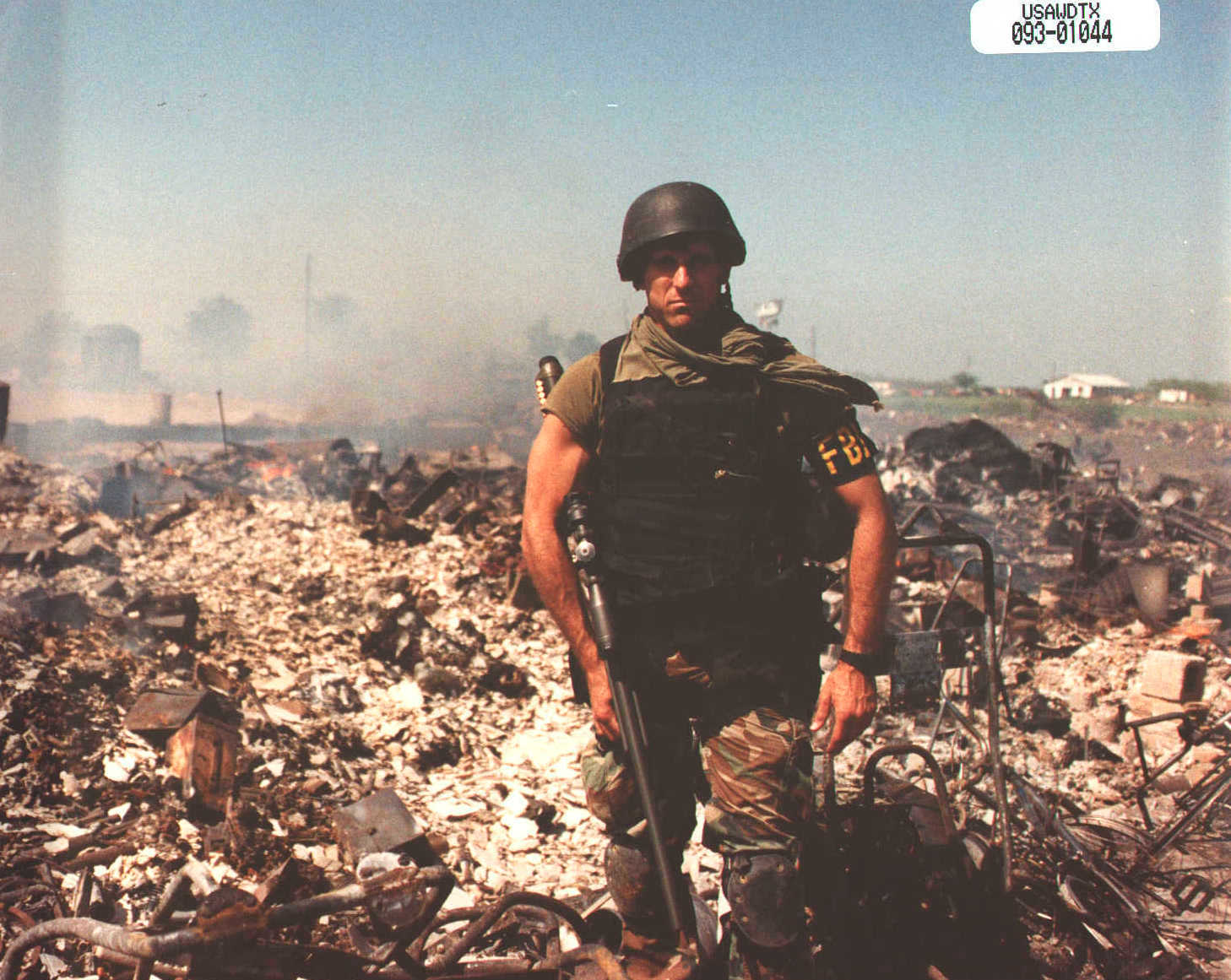
An FBI HRT sniper poses for a photograph in the remains of the burned building next to the corpse of a Branch Davidian.

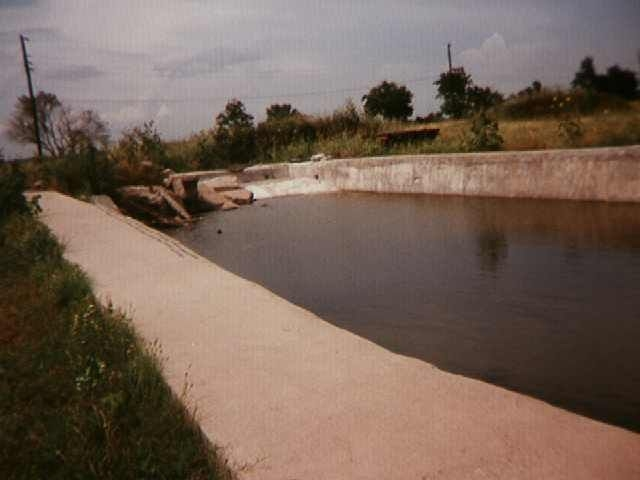
The remains of a swimming pool on the site of the compound in 1997

The new ATF Director, John Magaw, criticized several aspects of the ATF raid. Magaw made the Treasury "Blue Book" report on Waco required reading for new agents. A 1995 Government Accountability Office report on the use of force by federal law enforcement agencies observed that "On the basis of Treasury's report on the Waco operation and views of tactical operations experts and ATF's own personnel, ATF decided in October 1995 that dynamic entry would only be planned after all other options have been considered and began to adjust its training accordingly."

Nothing remains of the buildings today other than concrete foundation components, as the entire site was bulldozed two weeks after the end of the siege. Only a small chapel, built years after the siege, stands on the site. It is still used by the remaining Branch Davidians as a place of worship and memorial. A memorial plaque for the four ATF agents killed in the shootout is on the grounds as is the barbed wire the authorities used to prevent the cult members from escaping.

In the years following the siege, the ATF received significant criticism for their actions at Waco. The Waco siege has become a "symbol of government oppression" by those critical of the government generally. Critics blame the ATF for improper planning, execution, communication and exaggerating the threat that the Branch Davidians posed as being the leading causes for the deaths of the women and children in the compound. The siege is often viewed as one of the worst and most deadly failures in the history of the agency.

=== FBI's post-Waco adjustments ===
The Waco siege prompted the FBI to reevaluate its tactics and procedures. The agency made several adjustments in response to the criticism it faced. Firstly, there was a greater emphasis on crisis negotiation and peaceful resolutions, leading to increased training and the establishment of specialized negotiation teams. Secondly, the Hostage Rescue Team underwent enhancements in terms of training, equipment, and coordination to improve their effectiveness in high-risk operations. Interagency cooperation was emphasized to facilitate better coordination and information sharing among federal entities involved in complex operations. The FBI also recognized the value of intelligence gathering and analysis, leading to a focus on enhancing intelligence capabilities. Lastly, after-action reviews were conducted, and lessons learned were incorporated into training programs to better prepare agents for future situations.

=== Trial and imprisonments of Branch Davidians ===
The events at Mount Carmel spurred both criminal prosecution and civil litigation. On August 3, 1993, a federal grand jury returned a superseding ten-count indictment against 12 of the surviving Branch Davidians. The grand jury charged, among other things, that the Branch Davidians had conspired to, and aided and abetted in, the murder of federal officers, and had unlawfully possessed and used various firearms. The government dismissed the charges against one of the 12 Branch Davidians according to a plea bargain.

After a jury trial lasting nearly two months, the jury acquitted four of the Branch Davidians on all charges. Additionally, the jury acquitted all of the Branch Davidians on the murder-related charges but convicted five of them on lesser charges, including aiding and abetting the voluntary manslaughter of federal agents. Eight Branch Davidians were convicted on firearms charges.

The convicted Branch Davidians, who received sentences of up to 40 years, were:

- Kevin A. Whitecliff – convicted of voluntary manslaughter and using a firearm during a crime.
- Jaime Castillo – convicted of voluntary manslaughter and using a firearm during a crime.
- Paul Gordon Fatta – convicted of conspiracy to possess machine guns and aiding Branch Davidian leader Koresh in possessing machine guns.
- Renos Lenny Avraam (British national) – convicted of voluntary manslaughter and using a firearm during a crime.
- Graeme Leonard Craddock (Australian national) – convicted of possessing a grenade and using or possessing a firearm during a crime.
- Brad Eugene Branch – convicted of voluntary manslaughter and using a firearm during a crime.
- Livingstone Fagan (British national) – convicted of voluntary manslaughter and using a firearm during a crime.
- Ruth Riddle (Canadian national) – convicted of using or carrying a weapon during a crime.
- Kathy Schroeder – sentenced to three years after pleading guilty to a reduced charge of forcibly resisting arrest.

Six of the eight Branch Davidians appealed both their sentences and their convictions. They raised a host of issues, challenging the constitutionality of the prohibition on possession of machine guns, the jury instructions, the district court's conduct of the trial, the sufficiency of the evidence, and the sentences imposed. The United States Court of Appeals for the Fifth Circuit vacated the defendants' sentences for use of machine guns, determining that the district court had made no finding that they had "actively employed" the weapons, but left the verdicts undisturbed in all other respects, in United States v. Branch, 91 F.3d 699 (5th Cir. 1996), cert. denied (1997).

On remand, the district court found that the defendants had actively employed machine guns and re-sentenced five of them to substantial prison terms. The defendants again appealed. The Fifth Circuit Court of Appeals affirmed. The Branch Davidians pressed this issue before the United States Supreme Court. The Supreme Court reversed, holding that the term "machine gun" in the relevant statute created an element of the offense to be determined by a jury, rather than a sentencing factor to be determined by a judge, as had happened in the trial court. On September 19, 2000, Judge Walter Smith followed the Supreme Court's instructions and cut 25 years from the sentences of five convicted Branch Davidians, and five years from the sentence of another. All Branch Davidians had been released from prison by July 2007.

Thirty-three British citizens were among the Branch Davidians during the siege. Twenty-four of them were among the 80 Branch Davidian fatalities (in the raid of February 28 and the assault of April 19), including at least one child. Two more British nationals who survived the siege were immediately arrested as "material witnesses" and imprisoned without trial for months. Derek Lovelock was held in McLennan County Jail for seven months, often in solitary confinement. Livingstone Fagan, another British citizen, who was among those convicted and imprisoned, says he received multiple beatings from correctional officers, particularly at Leavenworth. There, Fagan claims to have been doused inside his cell with cold water from a high-pressure hose, after which an industrial fan was placed outside the cell, blasting him with cold air. Fagan was repeatedly moved between at least nine different facilities. He was strip-searched every time he took exercise, so he refused exercise. Released and deported back to the UK in July 2007, he still retained his religious beliefs.

=== Civil suits by Branch Davidians ===
Several of the surviving Branch Davidians, as well as more than a hundred family members of those who had died or were injured in the confrontation, brought civil suits against the United States government, numerous federal officials, the former governor of Texas Ann Richards, and members of the Texas Army National Guard. They sought monetary damages under the Federal Tort Claims Act, civil rights statutes, the Racketeer Influenced and Corrupt Organizations Act, and Texas state law. The bulk of these claims were dismissed because they were insufficient as a matter of law or because the plaintiffs could advance no material evidence in support of them.

The trial ran from June 19 through July 14, 2000. Under the Federal Tort Claims Act, plaintiffs had no right to a jury trial, but on plaintiffs' motion, Judge Walter S. Smith Jr. empaneled a five-member advisory jury. The advisory jury found that the United States had not acted negligently in any respect, and Judge Smith subsequently issued findings of fact and conclusions of law adopting that result, entering a final "take-nothing" judgment against the plaintiffs on September 20, 2000. ATF agents returned gunfire to the building, the court ruled, to protect themselves and other agents from death or serious bodily harm. The court found that the government's planning of the siege—i.e., the decisions to use tear gas against the Branch Davidians; to insert the tear gas using military vehicles and to omit specific planning for the possibility that a fire would erupt—was a discretionary function for which the government could not be sued. The court also found that the use of tear gas was not negligent. Further, even if the United States government were negligent by causing damage to the buildings before the fires broke out, thus either blocking escape routes or enabling the fires to spread faster, that negligence did not legally cause the plaintiffs' injuries because the Branch Davidians started the fires.

The Branch Davidians appealed. They contended that the trial court judge, Walter S. Smith Jr., should have recused himself from hearing their claims on account of his relationships with defendants, defense counsel, and court staff; prior judicial determinations; and comments during trial. The Fifth Circuit concluded that these allegations did not reflect conduct that would cause a reasonable observer to question Judge Smith's impartiality, and it affirmed the take-nothing judgment, in Andrade v. Chojnacki, 338 F.3d 448 (5th Cir. 2003), cert. denied (2004).

== Press coverage surrounding the Waco siege ==
The press coverage of the Waco siege was criticized for its sensationalism and for providing a platform for Koresh and his followers. Some journalists were accused of glamorizing Koresh and his beliefs, leading to concerns that the media attention may have unintentionally fueled the cult leader's messianic complex and prolonged the standoff. The legal proceedings that followed were complex and involved charges ranging from firearms violations to conspiracy to commit murder.

The trials were also criticized by some who believed that the defendants that were fueled by the media did not receive a fair trial or that the government failed to fully investigate its own actions during the siege.

== Controversies ==
Roland Ballesteros, one of the agents assigned to the ATF door team that assaulted the front door, told Texas Rangers and Waco police that he thought the first shots came from the ATF dog team assigned to neutralize the Branch Davidians' dogs, but later at the trial, he insisted that the Branch Davidians had shot first. The Branch Davidians also claimed that the ATF door team opened fire at the door, and they returned fire in self-defense. An Austin Chronicle article noted, "Long before the fire," the Davidians were discussing the evidence contained in the doors. During the siege, in a phone conversation with the FBI, Steve Schneider, one of Koresh's main confidants told FBI agents that 'the evidence from the front door will clearly show how many bullets and what happened'." Houston attorney Dick DeGuerin, who went inside Mount Carmel during the siege, testified at the trial that protruding metal on the inside of the right-hand entry door made it clear that the bullet holes were made by incoming rounds. DeGuerin also testified that only the right-hand entry door had bullet holes, while the left-hand entry door was intact. The government presented the left-hand entry door at the trial, claiming that the right-hand entry door had been lost. The left-hand door contained numerous bullet holes made by both outgoing and incoming rounds. Texas Trooper Sgt. David Keys testified that he witnessed two men loading what could have been the missing door into a U-Haul van shortly after the siege had ended, but he did not see the object. Michael Caddell, the lead attorney for the Branch Davidians' wrongful death lawsuit explained, "The fact that the left-hand door is in the condition it's in tells you that the right-hand door was not consumed by the fire. It was lost on purpose by somebody." Caddell offered no evidence to support this allegation, which has never been proven. Fire investigators stated that it was "extremely unlikely" that the steel right door could have suffered damage in the fire much greater than did the steel left door, and both doors would have been found together. The right door remains missing, and the entire site was under close supervision by law enforcement officials until the debris—including both doors—had been removed.

In the weeks preceding the raid, Rick Alan Ross, a self-described cult expert and deprogrammer affiliated with the Cult Awareness Network, appeared on major networks such as NBC and CBS in regard to Koresh. Ross later described his role in advising authorities about the Davidians and Koresh, and what actions should be taken to end the siege. He was quoted as saying that he was consulted by the ATF and he contacted the FBI on March 4, 1993, requesting "that he be interviewed regarding his knowledge of cults in general and the Branch Davidians in particular." The FBI reports that it did not rely on Ross for advice whatsoever during the standoff, but that it did an interview and received input from him. Ross also telephoned the FBI on March 27 and March 28, offering advice about negotiation strategies, suggesting that the FBI "...attempt to embarrass Koresh by informing other members of the compound about Koresh's faults and failures in life, in order to convince them that Koresh was not the prophet they had been led to believe." The ATF also contacted Ross in January 1993 for information about Koresh. Several writers have documented the Cult Awareness Network's role about the government's decision-making concerning Waco. Mark MacWilliams notes that several studies have shown how "self-styled cult experts like Ross, anticult organizations like the Cult Awareness Network (CAN), and disaffected Branch Davidian defectors like Breault played important roles in popularizing a harshly negative image of Koresh as a dangerous cult leader. Portrayed as "self-obsessed, egomaniacal, sociopathic and heartless", Koresh was frequently characterized as either a religious lunatic who doomed his followers to mass suicide or a con man who manipulated religion for his own bizarre personal advantage." According to religious scholars Phillip Arnold and James Tabor who made an effort to help resolve the conflict, "the crisis need not have ended tragically if only the FBI had been more open to Religious Studies and better able to distinguish between the dubious ideas of Ross and the scholarly expertise."

In a New Yorker article in 2014, Canadian journalist Malcolm Gladwell wrote that Arnold and Tabor told the FBI that Koresh needed to be persuaded of an alternative interpretation of the Book of Revelation, one that does not involve a violent end. They made an audiotape, which they played for Koresh, and which seemed to convince him. The FBI waited only three days before beginning the assault, instead of an estimated two weeks for Koresh to complete a manuscript sparked by this alternative interpretation, and then come out peacefully. An article by Stuart A. Wright published in Nova Religio discussed how the FBI mishandled the siege, stating that "there is no greater example of misfeasance than the failure of the Federal Bureau of Investigation (FBI) to bring about a bloodless resolution to the 51-day standoff." Some of Wright's major concerns about the operation include that the FBI officials, especially Dick Rogers, exhibited increasing impatience and aggression when the conflict could have been resolved by more peaceful negotiation. He mentions that Rogers said in an interview with the FBI that "when we started depriving them, [we were] really driving people closer to him [Koresh] because of their devotion to him," which was different from what he said in the Department of Justice report.

Attorney General Reno had specifically directed that no pyrotechnic devices be used in the assault. Between 1993 and 1999, FBI spokesmen denied (even under oath) the use of any sort of pyrotechnic devices during the assault, but pyrotechnic Flite-Rite CS gas grenades had been found in the rubble immediately following the fire. In 1999, FBI spokesmen backtracked, saying that they had used the grenades, but then contended they had only been used during an early morning attempt to penetrate a covered, water-filled construction pit 40 yards (35 m) away and were not fired into the building. The FBI stated that the pyrotechnic devices were unlikely to have contributed to the fire. When the FBI's documents were turned over to Congress for an investigation in 1994, the page listing the use of the pyrotechnic devices was missing. The failure for six years to disclose the use of pyrotechnics, despite her specific directive, led Reno to demand an investigation. A senior FBI official told Newsweek that as many as 100 FBI agents had known about the use of pyrotechnics, but no one spoke up until 1999.

The FBI had planted surveillance devices in the walls of the building, which captured several conversations the government claims are evidence that the Davidians started the fire. The recordings were imperfect and at many times difficult to understand, and the two transcriptions that were made had differences at many points. According to reporter Diana Fuentes, when the FBI's April 19 tapes were played in court during the Branch Davidian trials, few people heard what the FBI audio expert claimed to hear; the tapes "were filled with noise, and voices only occasionally were discernible… The words were faint; some courtroom observers said they heard it, some didn't." The Branch Davidians had given ominous warnings involving a fire on several occasions. This may or may not have been indicative of the Branch Davidians' future actions, but was the basis for the conclusion of Congress that the fire was started by the Branch Davidians, "absent any other potential source of ignition." This was before the FBI admission that pyrotechnics were used, but a yearlong investigation by the Office of the Special Counsel after that admission nonetheless reached the same conclusion, and no further congressional investigations followed. During a 1999 deposition for civil suits by Branch Davidian survivors, fire survivor Graeme Craddock was interviewed. He stated that he saw some Branch Davidians moving about a dozen one gallon (3.8 L) cans of fuel so they would not be run over by armored vehicles, heard talk of pouring fuel outside the building, and after the fire had started, something that sounded like "light the fire" from another person. Professor Kenneth Newport's book The Branch Davidians of Waco attempts to prove that starting the fire themselves was pre-planned and consistent with the Branch Davidians' theology. He cites as evidence the above-mentioned recordings by the FBI during the siege, testimonials of survivors Clive Doyle and Graeme Craddock, and the buying of diesel fuel one month before the start of the siege.

The FBI received contradictory reports on the possibility of Koresh's suicide and was not sure about whether he would commit suicide. The evidence made them believe that there was no possibility of mass suicide, with Koresh and Schneider repeatedly denying to the negotiators that they had plans to commit mass suicide, and people leaving the compound saying that they had seen no preparations for such a thing. There was a possibility that some of his followers would join Koresh if he decided to commit suicide. According to Alan A. Stone's report, during the siege the FBI used an incorrect psychiatric perspective to evaluate Branch Davidians' responses, which caused them to over-rely on Koresh's statements that they would not commit suicide. According to Stone, this incorrect evaluation caused the FBI to not ask pertinent questions to Koresh and to others on the compound about whether they were planning a mass suicide. A more pertinent question would have been, "What will you do if we tighten the noose around the compound in a show of overwhelming power, and using CS gas, force you to come out?" Stone wrote:

The tactical arm of federal law enforcement may conventionally think of the other side as a band of criminals or as a military force or, generically, as the aggressor. But the Branch Davidians were an unconventional group in an exalted, disturbed and desperate state of mind. They were devoted to David Koresh as the Lamb of God. They were willing to die defending themselves in an apocalyptic ending and, in the alternative, to kill themselves and their children. However, these were neither psychiatrically depressed, suicidal people nor cold-blooded killers. They were ready to risk death as a test of their faith. The psychology of such behavior—together with its religious significance for the Branch Davidians—was mistakenly evaluated, if not simply ignored, by those responsible for the FBI strategy of "tightening the noose". The overwhelming show of force was not working in the way the tacticians supposed. It did not provoke the Branch Davidians to surrender, but it may have provoked David Koresh to order the mass-suicide.

=== Danforth's report ===
The Oklahoma City bombing on April 19, 1995, caused the media to revisit many of the questionable aspects of the government's actions at Waco, and many Americans who previously supported those actions began asking for an investigation of them. By 1999—as a result of certain aspects of the documentaries discussed below, as well as allegations made by advocates for Branch Davidians during litigation, public opinion held that the federal government had engaged in serious misconduct at Waco. A Time poll conducted on August 26, 1999, for example, indicated that 61 percent of the public believed that federal law enforcement officials started the fire at the Branch Davidian complex.

In September 1999, Attorney General Reno appointed former US Senator John C. Danforth as Special Counsel to investigate the matter. In particular, the Special Counsel was directed to investigate charges that government agents started or spread the fire at the Mount Carmel complex, directed gunfire at the Branch Davidians, and unlawfully employed the armed forces of the United States. A yearlong investigation ensued, during which the Office of the Special Counsel interviewed 1,001 witnesses, reviewed over 2.3 million pages of documents, and examined thousands of pounds of physical evidence. In the "Final report to the Deputy Attorney General concerning the 1993 confrontation at the Mt. Carmel Complex, Waco Texas" of November 8, 2000, Special Counsel Danforth concluded that the allegations were meritless. The report found that certain government employees had failed to disclose during litigation against the Branch Davidians the use of pyrotechnic devices at the complex, and had obstructed the Special Counsel's investigation. Disciplinary action was pursued against the employees.

Allegations that the government started the fire were largely based on an FBI agent's having fired three "pyrotechnic" tear gas rounds, which are delivered with a charge that burns. The Special Counsel concluded that the rounds did not start or contribute to the spread of the fire, based on their finding that the FBI fired the rounds nearly four hours before the fire started, at a concrete construction pit partially filled with water, 75 feet (23 m) away and downwind from the main living quarters of the complex. The Special Counsel noted that recorded interceptions of Branch Davidian conversations included such statements as "David said we have to get the fuel on" and "So we light it first when they come in with the tank right ... right as they're coming in." Some Branch Davidians who survived the fire acknowledged that other Branch Davidians started the fire. FBI agents witnessed Branch Davidians pouring fuel and igniting a fire, and noted these observations contemporaneously. Lab analysis found accelerants on the clothing of Branch Davidians, and investigators found deliberately punctured fuel cans and a homemade torch at the site. Based on this evidence and testimony, the Special Counsel concluded that the fire was started by the Branch Davidians.

Charges that government agents fired shots into the complex on April 19, 1993, were based on forward looking infrared (FLIR) video recorded by the Night Stalkers aircraft. These tapes showed 57 flashes, with some occurring around government vehicles that were operating near the complex. The Office of Special Counsel conducted a field test of FLIR technology on March 19, 2000, to determine whether gunfire caused the flashes. The testing was conducted under a protocol agreed to and signed by attorneys and experts for the Branch Davidians and their families, as well as for the government. Analysis of the shape, duration, and location of the flashes indicated that they resulted from a reflection off debris on or around the complex, rather than gunfire. Additionally, an independent expert review of photography taken at the scene showed no people at or near the points from which the flashes emanated. Interviews of Branch Davidians, government witnesses, filmmakers, writers, and advocates for the Branch Davidians found that none had witnessed any government gunfire on April 19. None of the Branch Davidians who died on that day displayed evidence of having been struck by a high velocity round, as would be expected had they been shot from outside of the complex by government sniper rifles or other assault weapons. Given this evidence, the Special Counsel concluded that the claim that government gunfire occurred on April 19, 1993, amounted to "an unsupportable case based entirely upon flawed technological assumptions."

The Special Counsel considered whether the use of active-duty military at Waco violated the Posse Comitatus Act or the Military Assistance to Law Enforcement Act. These statutes generally prohibit direct military participation in law enforcement functions but do not preclude indirect support such as lending equipment, training in the use of equipment, offering expert advice, and providing equipment maintenance. The Special Counsel noted that the military provided "extensive" loans of equipment to the ATF and FBI, including—among other things—two tanks, the offensive capability of which had been disabled. Additionally, the military provided limited advice, training, and medical support. The Special Counsel concluded that these actions amounted to indirect military assistance within the bounds of applicable law. The Texas National Guard, in its state status, also provided substantial loans of military equipment, as well as performing reconnaissance flights over the Branch Davidian complex. Because the Posse Comitatus Act does not apply to the National Guard in its state status, the Special Counsel determined that the National Guard lawfully provided its assistance.

Ramsey Clark—a former US Attorney General, who represented several Branch Davidian survivors and relatives in a civil lawsuit—said that the report "failed to address the obvious": "History will clearly record, I believe, that these assaults on the Mt. Carmel church center remain the greatest domestic law enforcement tragedy in the history of the United States."

== Equipment and manpower ==
=== Government agencies ===
- Raid (February 28): 75 federal agents (ATF and FBI); three Sikorsky UH-60 Black Hawk helicopters crewed by 10 Texas National Guard counter-drug personnel as distraction during the raid and filming; ballistic protection equipment, fire retardant clothing, regular flashlights, regular cameras (i.e., flash photography), pump-action shotguns and flashbang grenades, 9 mm handguns, 9 mm MP5 submachine guns, 5.56 NATO M16 rifles, a .308 bolt-action sniper rifle.
- Siege (March 1 through April 18): Hundreds of federal agents; two Bell UH-1 Iroquois helicopters.
- Assault (April 19): Hundreds of federal agents; military vehicles (with their normal weapon systems removed): approx. nine M3 Bradley infantry fighting vehicles, four or five M728 Combat Engineering Vehicles (CEVs) armed with CS gas, two M1A1 Abrams main battle tanks, one M88 recovery vehicle.
- Support: one Britten-Norman Defender surveillance aircraft; a number of Texas National Guard personnel for maintenance of military vehicles and training on the use of the vehicles and their support vehicles (Humvees and flatbed trucks); surveillance from Texas National Guard counter-drug UC-26 surveillance aircraft and from Alabama National Guard; three soldiers from Delta Force, to serve as observers (also present during assault); two senior US Army officers as advisers, two members of the British Army's 22nd Special Air Service as observers; 50+ men in total.

=== Branch Davidians ===
The Branch Davidians were well-stocked with small arms, possessing 305 total firearms, including numerous rifles (semi-automatic AK-47s and AR-15s), shotguns, revolvers and pistols; 46 semi-automatic firearms modified to fire in fully automatic mode (included on above list): 22 AR-15 (erroneously referred to as M16), 20 AK-47 rifles, 2 HK SP-89, 2 M-11/Nine Texas Rangers reported "at least 16 AR-15 rifles,"; 2 AR-15 lower receivers modified to fire in fully automatic mode; 39 "auto sear" devices used to convert semi-automatic weapons into automatic weapons; parts for fully automatic AK-47 and M16 rifles; 30-round magazines and 100-round magazines for M16 and AK-47 rifles; pouches to carry large ammunition magazines; substantial quantities of ammunition of various sizes.

Other items found at the compound included about 1.9 million rounds of "cooked off" ammunition; grenade launcher parts; flare launchers; gas masks and chemical warfare suits; night vision equipment; hundreds of practice hand grenade hulls and components (including more than 200 inert M31 practice rifle grenades, more than 100 modified M-21 practice hand grenade bodies, 219 grenade safety pins and 243 grenade safety levers found after the fire); Kevlar helmets and ballistic vests; 88 lower receivers for the AR-15 rifle; and approximately 15 sound suppressors or silencers (the Treasury reports lists 21 silencers, Texas Rangers report that at least six items had been mislabeled and were actually 40 mm grenades or flash bang grenades from manufacturers who sold those models to the ATF or FBI exclusively; former Branch Davidian Donald Bunds testified he had manufactured silencers under direct orders of Koresh).

The ATF knew that the Branch Davidians had two .50 caliber rifles, so they asked for Bradley fighting vehicles, which could resist that caliber. During the siege, Koresh said that he had weapons bigger than .50 rifles and that he could destroy the Bradleys, so they were supplemented with two Abrams tanks and five M728 vehicles. The Texas Rangers recovered at least two .50 caliber weapons from the remains of the compound.

Whether the Branch Davidians fired the .50 caliber rifles during the raid or the assault is disputed. Various groups supporting gun control, such as Handgun Control Incorporated and the Violence Policy Center, have claimed that the Branch Davidians had fired .50 caliber rifles, and they have cited this as one reason to ban these weapons. The ATF claims such rifles were used against ATF agents the day of the search. Several years later, the General Accounting Office, in response to a request from Henry Waxman, released a briefing paper titled "Criminal Activity Associated with .50 Caliber Semiautomatic Rifles" that repeated the ATF's claims that the Branch Davidians used .50 caliber rifles during the search. FBI Hostage Rescue Team snipers reported sighting one of the weapons, readily identifiable by its distinctive muzzle brake, during the siege.

== Legacy ==
=== Connection to the Oklahoma City bombing ===
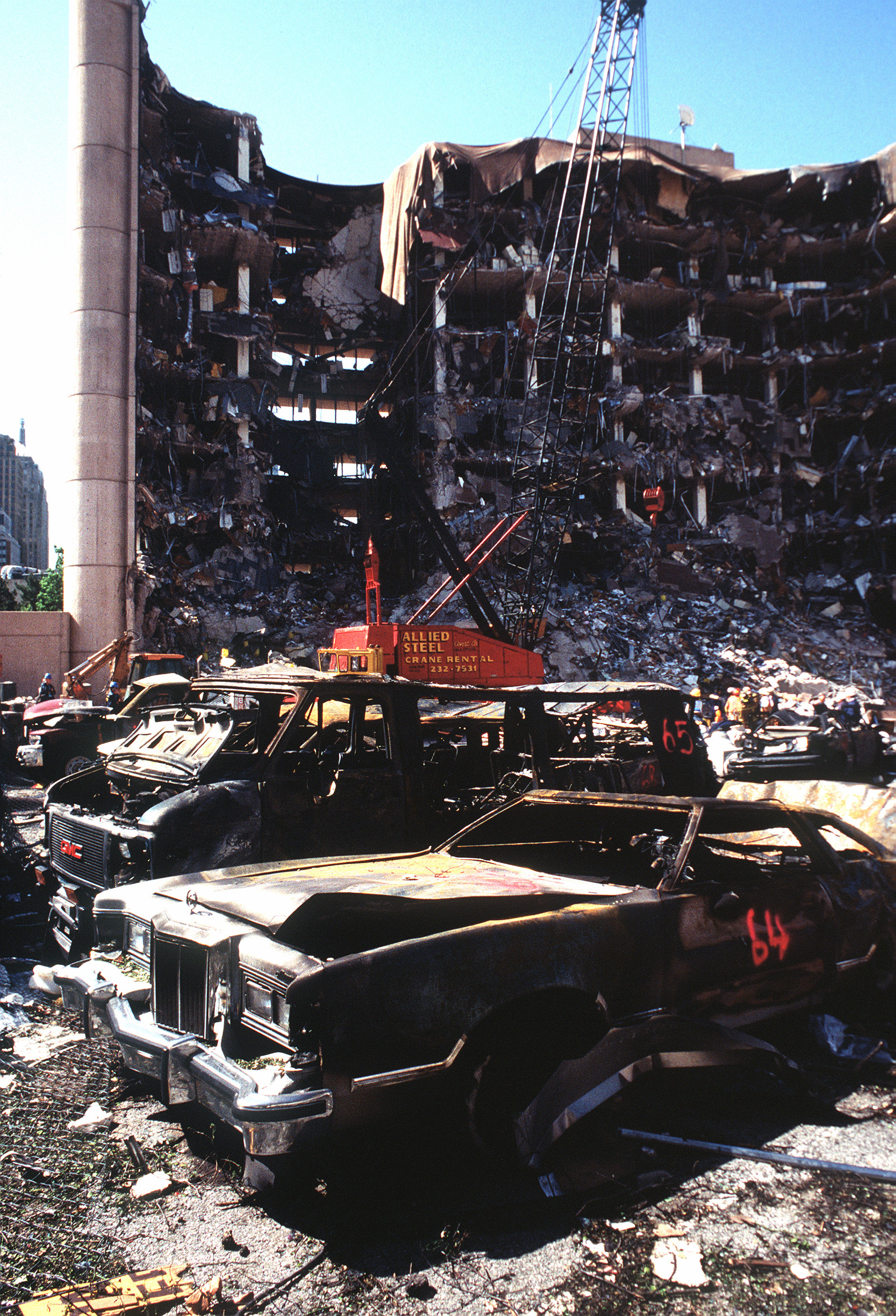
The destroyed Alfred P. Murrah Federal Building

Timothy McVeigh cited the Waco incident as a primary motivation for the Oklahoma City bombing, his April 19, 1995 truck bomb attack that destroyed the Alfred P. Murrah Federal Building, a US government office complex in downtown Oklahoma City, and destroyed or damaged numerous other buildings in the vicinity. The attack claimed 168 lives (including 19 children under age 6) and left over 600 injured in the deadliest act of terrorism on US soil before the Al-Qaeda perpetrated September 11 attacks. As of 2026, it remains the deadliest act of domestic terrorism in American history. (Note: Prior to 9–11, the deadliest act of terror against the United States was the bombing of Pan Am Flight 103, which killed 189 Americans.)

Within days after the bombing, McVeigh and Terry Nichols were both taken into custody for their roles in the bombing. Investigators determined that the two were both sympathizers of an anti-government militia movement and that their motive was to avenge the government's handling of the Waco and Ruby Ridge incidents. McVeigh testified that he chose the date of April 19 because it was the second anniversary of the deadly fire at Mount Carmel. In March 1993, McVeigh drove from Arizona to Waco to observe the federal standoff. Along with other protesters, he was photographed by the FBI, and McVeigh was briefly interviewed by a television reporter. A courtroom reporter also claims to have later seen McVeigh outside the courthouse at Waco, selling anti-government bumper stickers.

Other events sharing the date of fire at Mt. Carmel have been mentioned in discussions of the Waco siege. The April 20th 1999, Columbine High School massacre was intended to be timed on April 19th in connection with McVeigh’s 1995 attack, however it was delayed as perpetrators Eric and Dylan did not get their ammunition in time, thus making it appear to have been (coincidentally) timed on Adolf Hitler’s birthday. Eight years before the Waco fire, the ATF and FBI raided another compound of a religious cult: The Covenant, the Sword, and the Arm of the Lord. Some ATF agents who were present at that raid were present at Waco. April 19 was also the date from the American Revolution's opening battles of Lexington and Concord.

=== Montana Freeman siege ===
The Montana Freemen became the center of public attention in 1996 when they engaged in a prolonged armed standoff with agents of the FBI. The Waco siege, as well as the 1992 incident between the Weaver family and the FBI at Ruby Ridge, Idaho, were still fresh in the public mind, and the FBI was extremely cautious and wanted to prevent a recurrence of those violent events. After 81 days of negotiations, the Freemen surrendered to authorities on June 14, 1996, without loss of life.

=== Canadian anti-government militia ===
Several men with ties to the Canadian Armed Forces, including 2 active duty soldiers, were arrested in 2024, accused of creating an "anti-government militia". After a 2 year investigation by the RCMP, following a tip by CSIS, 4 men from Quebec were arrested with an extreme amount of firepower. According to the RCMP, 16 explosive devices, 83 firearms and accessories, approximately 11,000 rounds of ammunition of various calibres, nearly 130 magazines, four pairs of night vision goggles and military equipment were seized, as well as grenades. One of those arrested, Marc-Aurèle Chabot, allegedly said on a podcast in 2023, that "It's gonna be another Waco.", according to court documents.

=== Media portrayals of Waco ===
The Waco siege has been the subject of numerous documentary films and books. The first film was a made-for television docudrama film, In the Line of Duty: Ambush in Waco, which was made during the siege, before the April 19 assault on the church, and presented the initial firefight of February 28, 1993 as an ambush. The film's writer, Phil Penningroth, has since disowned his screenplay as pro-ATF "propaganda".

==== Books ====
The first book about the incident was 1993's Inside the Cult co-authored by ex-Branch Davidian Marc Breault, who left the group in September 1989, and Martin King who interviewed Koresh for Australian television in 1992. In July 1993, true crime author Clifford L. Linedecker published his book Massacre at Waco, Texas.

Shortly after, in 1994, a collection of 45 essays called From the Ashes: Making Sense of Waco was published, about the events of Waco from various cultural, historical, and religious perspectives. The essays in the book include one by Michael Barkun that talked about how the Branch Davidians' behavior was consistent with other millenarian religious sects and how the use of the word cult is used to discredit religious organizations, one by James R. Lewis that claims a large amount of evidence that the FBI lit the fires, and many others. All of these perspectives are united in the belief that the deaths of the Branch Davidians at Waco could have been prevented and that "the popular demonization of nontraditional religious movements in the aftermath of Waco represents a continuing threat to freedom of religion".

Carol Moore's The Davidian Massacre: Disturbing Questions About Waco That Must Be Answered was published in 1995.

The American novelist John Updike was directly inspired by the Waco events in writing the fourth and last part of his book In the Beauty of the Lilies (1996).

==== Documentaries ====
The first documentary films critical of the official versions were Waco, the Big Lie and Waco II, the Big Lie Continues, both produced by Linda Thompson in 1993. Thompson's films made several controversial allegations, the most notorious of which was her claim that footage of an armored vehicle breaking through the outer walls of the compound, with an appearance of orange light on its front, was showing a flamethrower attached to the vehicle, setting fire to the building. As a response to Thompson, Michael McNulty released footage to support his counter-claim that the appearance of light was a reflection on aluminized insulation that was torn from the wall and snagged on the vehicle. (The vehicle is an M728 CEV, which is not normally equipped with a flamethrower.) McNulty accused Thompson of "creative editing" in his film Waco: An Apparent Deviation. Thompson worked from a VHS copy of the surveillance tape; McNulty was given access to a beta original. McNulty in turn was later accused of having digitally altered his footage, an allegation he denied.

The next film was Day 51: The True Story of Waco, produced in 1995 by Richard Mosley and featuring Ron Cole, a self-proclaimed militia member from Colorado who was later prosecuted for weapons violations. Thompson's and Mosley's films, along with extensive coverage given to the Waco siege on some talk radio shows, galvanized support for the Branch Davidians among some sections of the right, including the nascent militia movement, while critics on the left also denounced the government siege on civil liberties grounds. In 2000, radio host and conspiracy theorist Alex Jones made a documentary film, America Wake Up (Or Waco), about the government's purported role in the siege.

In 1997, filmmakers Dan Gifford and Amy Sommer produced their Emmy Award-winning documentary film, Waco: The Rules of Engagement, presenting a history of the Branch Davidian movement and a critical examination of the conduct of law enforcement, both leading up to the raid and through the aftermath of the fire. The film features footage of the Congressional hearings on Waco, and the juxtaposition of official government spokespeople with footage and evidence often directly contradicting the spokespeople. In the documentary, Dr. Edward Allard (who held patents on FLIR technology) maintained that flashes on the FBI's infra-red footage were consistent with a grenade launcher and automatic small arms fire from FBI positions at the back of the complex toward the locations that would have provided exits for Branch Davidians attempting to flee the fire. Waco: The Rules of Engagement was nominated for a 1997 Academy Award for best documentary and was followed by another film in 1999, Waco: A New Revelation.

In 2001, another Michael McNulty documentary, The F.L.I.R. Project, researched the aerial thermal images recorded by the FBI, and using identical FLIR equipment recreated the same results as were recorded by federal agencies April 19, 1993. Subsequent government-funded studies contend that the infra-red evidence does not support the view that the FBI improperly used incendiary devices or fired on Branch Davidians. Infra-red experts continue to disagree and filmmaker Amy Sommer stands by the original conclusions presented in Waco: The Rules of Engagement.

The documentary The Assault on Waco was first aired in 2006 on the Discovery Channel, detailing the entire incident. A British-American documentary, Inside Waco, was produced jointly by Channel 4 and HBO in 2007, attempting to show what happened inside by piecing together accounts from the parties involved. The MSNBC documentary Witness to Waco: Inside the Siege was released in 2009.

A Netflix documentary series called Waco: American Apocalypse, was released in March 2023. The series encompasses three episodes and features real and never before released footage and interviews with surviving cult members along with others involved.

==== Dramatizations ====
Independent film director, Hal Hartley, wrote and directed Soon, a stage play depicting the events inside the compound in 1998. It was first commissioned by, and first performed at the Salzberg Festival in Austria. Soon was first performed in the U.S. in Orange County, California at the Segerstrom Center for the Arts in 2001.

In 2018, the miniseries Waco premiered on Paramount Network, dramatizing both the Waco siege and the 1992 siege at Ruby Ridge. It received mixed reviews, with critics praising the direction and performances but criticizing the show's overly sympathetic portrayal of Koresh.

==== Songs ====
Grant Lee Buffalo's 1994 album Mighty Joe Moon opening track "Lone Star Song" directly references the siege.

Two heavy metal bands wrote songs about the Davidian standoff: Machine Head's "Davidian" opened their debut album Burn My Eyes and Sepultura’s "Amen" was the fourth track from their Chaos A.D. album. Native American activist Russell Means included a song about the siege on his 2007 album The Radical, titled "Waco: The White Man's Wounded Knee".

Punk rock band No use for a name wrote "51 days" about the massacre, and as a reference to how long the standoff lasted from their 1995 album ¡Leche con carne!.

Hard rock band AC/DC wrote Burnin Alive about the massacre, released in their 1995 album Ballbreaker.

Hip hop duo Heavy Metal Kings, featuring Vinnie Paz of Jedi Mind Tricks and Ill Bill, reference the siege in their song Impaled Nazarene from their 2011 self-titled debut. Ill Bill recounts Koresh's story, portraying him in a positive light. The track ends with an audio clip of Koresh talking as the music fades out over the last moment. Jedi Mind Tricks has a history of incorporating mysticism and conspiracy theories into his music, and he also incorporated them into the song Blood In Blood Out from the 2003 album Visions of Gandhi raps "I like blood/ I like tastin' ya flesh/ I like slugs/ I like David Koresh."

Also in 2011, British indie rock band the Indelicates released a concept album, David Koresh Superstar, about Koresh and the Waco siege.

Japanese doom metal band Church of Misery released a song about Koresh and the Waco Siege on their 2023 album Born Under a Mad Sign entitled "Come and Get Me Sucker (David Koresh)." The song also includes an audio sample from an interview between Koresh and journalist Martin King that originally aired on the Australian television program A Current Affair.

The closing track for Ethel Cain's 2025 album Willoughby Tucker, I'll Always Love You, "Waco, Texas", is named after the Waco siege.

On the 5th of September 2025 the Swiss Thrash metal group XONOR released the song "Waco", which is themed all around the siege.

=== Series ===
The Waco siege is used as a subplot in the South Park episode, "Two Guys Naked in a Hot Tub". In the episode, the ATF plans to save the day by stopping the 'cultists' of a meteor-shower from killing themselves. Even if it means they have to "Kill every single one of them". The episode depicted the ATF as incompetent and shows them killing multiple innocent people needlessly.

The X-Files season 4 episode 5, The Field Where I Died makes references to various cult related events from that period, including the Waco siege. The episode centres around an ATF and FBI investigation of a cult compound suspected to be involved in child abuse and illegal gun manufacturing.

In season 3, episode 11 of True Blood, Jason Stackhouse tells his romantic partner, Crystal Norris, that the Drug Enforcement Administration is planning to raid the drug dens her family and community operate in fictional town Hotshot, Louisiana. She responds, saying the community will fight back, or, kill everyone to avoid prosecution. Jason then exclaims it'll be Waco all over again.

==== Personal accounts ====
Branch Davidian survivor David Thibodeau wrote his account of life in the group and of the siege in the book A Place Called Waco, published in 1999. His book served in part as the basis for the 2018 Paramount Network six-part television drama miniseries Waco, starring Michael Shannon as the FBI negotiator Gary Noesner, Taylor Kitsch as Koresh, and Rory Culkin as Thibodeau. Developed by John Erick Dowdle and Drew Dowdle, it premiered on January 24, 2018.

The City of God: A New American Opera by Joshua Armenta dramatized the negotiations between the FBI and Koresh, premiered in 2012, utilizing actual transcripts from the negotiations as well as biblical texts and hymns from the Davidian hymnal. In 2015, Retro Report released a mini documentary looking back at Waco and how it has fueled many right-wing militias.

== See also ==
=== In the United States ===
- Alamo Christian Foundation
- Critical Incident Response Group of the FBI, formed in response to the incident
- Heaven's Gate (religious group), 1997
- Peoples Temple
- Short Creek raid, 1953, mass arrest of Mormon fundamentalists; criticized at the time for heavy-handed tactics
- Ken Ballew raid, 1971
- List of ATF Controversies
- Miracle Valley shootout, Arizona, 1982
- 1985 MOVE bombing, Philadelphia, 1985 siege
- Rainbow Farm, Michigan, 2001
- Shannon Street massacre, Memphis, Tennessee, 1983
- YFZ Ranch, located near Eldorado in Schleicher County, Texas
- Morrisite War, 1862, government siege of a religious group.

=== Other countries ===
- Grand Mosque Seizure, Mecca, Saudi Arabia, 1979
- Operation Blue Star, Golden Temple, Amritsar, India, 1984
- Memali siege, Kedah, Malaysia, 1985
- Aum affair, Japan, 1989-1995
- Order of the Solar Temple, 1994
- 2000 Uganda cult massacres, Movement for the Restoration of the Ten Commandments of God, Uganda, 2000
- Siege of Lal Masjid, Pakistan, 2007
- August 2013 Rabaa massacre, Egypt, 2013
- Arrest of Sant Rampal, India, 2014
- Shakahola Forest incident, Kilifi County, Kenya, 2023
- Arrest of Apollo Quiboloy, Davao City, Philippines, 2024

== Bibliography ==
=== Government investigations and hearings ===
- "Hearings before the Subcommittee on Oversight of the Committee on Ways and Means, House of Representatives, One Hundred Third Congress regarding Administration's fiscal year 1994 budget proposals for the Bureau of Alcohol, Tobacco, and Firearms, U.S. Tax Court, and Internal Revenue Service, April 22 and 28, 1993." Link to online and PDF versions.
- "Events surrounding the Branch Davidian cult standoff in Waco, Texas: hearing before the Committee on the Judiciary, House of Representatives, One Hundred Third Congress, first session, April 28, 1993." Archive.org Link to online and PDF versions.
- "Raid on the Branch Davidian Compound, Waco, Texas. Hearing before House of Representatives Committee on Appropriations subcommittee on the Treasury, Postal Service, and General Government Appropriations, June 9, 1993."
- "Texas Department of Public Safety, Texas Rangers Branch Davidian Evidence Reports" Archived January 7, 2009, at the Wayback Machine, released online September 1999 and January 2000.
  - Texas Rangers Investigative Report, Branch Davidian Evidence, September 1999 34.6 MB PDF
  - Texas Rangers Investigative Report No. 2, Branch Davidian Evidence, January 2000
  - Report #2, Part 1
  - Report #2, Part 2
  - Report #2, Part 3
  - Report #2, Part 4
- "Report of the Department of the Treasury on the Bureau of Alcohol." archive.org, PDF
  - Department of the Treasury, Memorandum to the Press "Weapons Possessed by the Branch Davidians" Archived May 15, 2011, at the Wayback Machine July 13, 1995.
- "Report to the Justice and Treasury Departments regarding law enforcement interaction with the Branch Davidians in Waco," by Nancy T. Ammerman, September 1993 and "Correspondence to Deputy Attorney General Heymann regarding Waco Report – Addendum" from Nancy T. Ammerman, September 10, 1993.
- "Report to the Deputy Attorney General on the Events at Waco" (redacted version), USDOJ, October 8, 1993. Also available from Department of Justice.
  - "Lessons of Waco: Proposed changes in Federal Law Enforcement" by Philip B. Heymann Deputy Attorney General. October 8, 1993. (Washington: USDOJ, 1993). ISBN 0-16-042977-3 Also available from Department of Justice.** "s:Evaluation of the Handling of the Branch Davidian Stand-off in Waco, Texas" (redacted version), Edward S.G. Dennis Jr., USDOJ, October 8, 1993.
  - "Recommendations of Experts for Improvements in Federal Law Enforcement after Waco," October 8, 1993 (Washington: USDOJ, 1993). ISBN 0-16-042974-9 (not available online)
  - Wikicommons FBI photos of April 19, 1993 siege and fire at Mount Carmel
- "Branch Davidian Negotiation Transcript from April 18," the day before the 1993 FBI actions and the Mount Carmel fire.
- "Report and Recommendations. Concerning the Handling of Incidents Such As the Branch Davidian Standoff in Waco Texas" Archived November 16, 2017, at the Wayback Machine, Alan A. Stone, M.D., November 10, 1993. (Also known as "Stone Report") (full copy including all documents Archived February 24, 2021, at the Wayback Machine, appendixes, press release, exhibits, etc.)
- "House of Representatives Report 104-749 – s:Activities of federal law enforcement agencies toward the Branch Davidians." Joint report by the House of Representatives' Committee on Government Reform and Oversight and Committee on the Judiciary's July 2005 hearings. (Or see Government printing office PDF .)
  - "Joint Hearings before the Subcommittee on Crime of the Committee on the Judiciary House of Representatives and the Subcommittee on National Security, International Affairs and Criminal Justice of the Committee on Government Reform and Oversight, One Hundred Fourth Congress, First Secession." Part 1 – July 19, 20, 21, 24: PDF; Part 2 – July 25, 26, 27: PDF; Part 3 – July 28, 31, August 1: PDF
  - "Department of Defense: Military Assistance During the Branch Davidian Incident," August 21, 2000 letter from Carol R. Schuster of National Security Preparedness Issues, to Dan Burton, Chairman of the Committee on Government Reform. PDF version Archived February 27, 2021, at the Wayback Machine
  - "Remarks to Federal Law Enforcement" regarding the House hearings, July 20, 1995, by Bill Clinton
- "The aftermath of Waco: changes in federal law enforcement. Hearings before the Committee on the Judiciary, United States Senate, One Hundred Fourth Congress. October 31 and November 1, 1995." Link to online and PDF versions.
- "Final report to the Deputy Attorney General concerning the 1993 confrontation at the Mt. Carmel Complex, Waco Texas," by John C. Danforth, special counsel. Issued November 8, 2000. (Also known as the "Danforth Report.") (cesnur.org copy Archived May 6, 2011, at the Wayback Machine, linked from PBS report Chronology | Waco - The Inside Story | FRONTLINE | PBS Archived May 15, 2011, at the Wayback Machine)
- "House Report 106-1037 – The Tragedy at Waco: New Evidence Examined, Committee on Government Reform. Thursday, December 28, 2000."
- Sacred and Profane: How not to negotiate with believers Archived March 28, 2014, at the Wayback Machine by Malcolm Gladwell, New Yorker, March 31, 2014

=== Legal proceedings ===
- United States v. Branch, W.D. Texas Criminal Case No. 6:93cr46, trial transcript January 10, 1994 – February 26, 1994; 91 F.3d 699 (5th Cir. 1996)
- United States v. Castillo, 179 F.3d 321 (1999); Castillo v. United States, 120 S.Ct. 2090 (2000); on remand, 220 F.3d 648 (5th Cir. 2000)
- Andrade v. United States, W.D. Texas Civil Action No. W-96-CA-139, trial transcript June 19, 2000 – July 14, 2000; 116 F.Supp.2d 778 (W.D. Tex. 2000)
- Andrade v. Chojnacki, 338 F.3d 448 (5th Cir. 2003)
- s: Graeme Craddock Testimony on Waco Fire, October 1999 civil suit deposition regarding April 19, 1993 fire at Branch Davidian home and church.

=== Books ===
- Anthony, D. and T. Robbins (1997). "Religious totalism, exemplary dualism and the Waco tragedy." In Robbins and Palmer 1997, Millennium, Messiahs, and Mayhem, 261–284.
- Christopher Whitcomb. Cold Zero: Inside the FBI Hostage Rescue Team. ISBN 0-552-14788-5. (Also covers Ruby Ridge.)
- Docherty, Jayne Seminare. Learning Lessons From Waco: When the Parties Bring Their Gods to the Negotiation Table (Syracuse, New York: Syracuse University Press, 2001). ISBN 0-8156-2751-3
- Kerstetter, Todd. "'That's Just the American Way': The Branch Davidian Tragedy and Western Religious History," Western Historical Quarterly, Vol. 35, No. 4, Winter 2004.
- Kopel, David B. and Paul H. Blackman. No More Wacos: What's Wrong With Federal Law Enforcement and How to Fix It (Amherst, New York: Prometheus Books, 1997). ISBN 1-57392-125-4
- Lewis, James R. (ed.). From the Ashes: Making Sense of Waco (Lanham, Maryland: Rowman & Littlefield, 1994). ISBN 0-8476-7915-2 (cloth) ISBN 0-8476-7914-4 (paper)
- Linedecker, Clifford L. Massacre at Waco, Texas: The Shocking Story of Cult Leader David Koresh and the Branch Davidians (New York: St. Martin's Paperbacks, 1993). ISBN 0-312-95226-0
- Lynch, Timothy. No Confidence: An Unofficial Account of the Waco Incident (Washington: Cato Institute, 2001).
- Moore, Carol. The Davidian Massacre: Disturbing Questions About Waco That Must Be Answered (Virginia: Gun Owners Foundation, 1995). ISBN 1-880692-22-8
- Newport, Kenneth G. C. The Branch Davidians of Waco: The History and Beliefs of an Apocalyptic Sect (Oxford University Press, 2006). ISBN 0-19-924574-6, 978-0-19-924574-1
- Reavis, Dick J. The Ashes of Waco: An Investigation (New York: Simon and Schuster, 1995). ISBN 0-684-81132-4
- Tabor, James D. and Eugene V. Gallagher. Why Waco?: Cults and the Battle for Religious Freedom in America (Berkeley: University of California Press, 1995). ISBN 0-520-20186-8
- Thibodeau, David and Leon Whiteson. A Place Called Waco: A Survivor's Story (New York: PublicAffairs, 1999). ISBN 1-891620-42-8
- Wright, Stuart A. (ed.). Armageddon in Waco: Critical Perspectives on the Branch Davidian Conflict (Chicago: University of Chicago Press, 1995).

=== Videos ===
- Waco: The Rules of Engagement (Oscar-nominated documentary); Archived December 27, 2019, at the Wayback Machine.

=== Movies and TV shows ===
- Waco, an American television miniseries, developed by John Erick Dowdle and Drew Dowdle, that premiered on January 24, 2018.
