= The Davidian Massacre =

1995 non-fiction book by Carol Moore

The Davidian Massacre: Disturbing Questions About Waco That Must Be Answered
- Author: Carol Moore
- Genre: Non-fiction
- Publisher: Gun Owners of America Foundation and Legacy Communications
- Publication date: 1 July 1995
- Pages: 494
- ISBN: 9781880692226
- OCLC: 924909794

The Davidian Massacre: Disturbing Questions About Waco That Must Be Answered is a 1995 non-fiction book about the Waco siege written by Carol Moore. It was co-published by the Gun Owners of America Foundation (Springfield, Virginia) and Legacy Communications (Franklin, Tennessee).

== Synopsis ==
The book presents Moore's interpretations of events concerning the lead up to, during, and after the Waco siege in 1993. The main argument of the book is that the Bureau of Alcohol, Tobacco, and Firearms (ATF) agents' fear of prosecution for mishandling their botched raid on 28 February 1993 led Federal Bureau of Investigation tactical agents to destroy evidence later into the siege.

== Scholarly reception ==
In a review essay concerning six other works on the Waco siege, Catherine Wessinger writes that the reporting of facts from Carol Moore is "compatible" with the other more scholarly works she reviews. Wessinger makes clear that Moore separates her speculations about the federal government's actions and the facts of the matter, and she compliments Moore's extensive citations.

Dean M. Kelley notes that work is published through the Gun Owners of America Foundation, an American gun rights organization, which might impact the interpretation of events (though, he acknowledges that it does not make the speculations untrue). Kelley believes that Moore is not as trustworthy as credentialed scholars, but Moore also is not privy to wild speculations about the federal government's actions either like those of Linda Thompson and other critics of the federal government. Kelley concludes that, if handled with caution, the book can be "useful and informative".

== Relationship with American right-wing politics ==
Gun rights and right-wing activists in the United States have utilized Moore's work for political gain or to push for a right-wing political agenda. For example, Peter R. Quinones for The Libertarian Institute argued that the federal government sought to regulate gun rights of the Branch Davidians despite the original ATF affidavit citing legal issues only with David Koresh, leader of the Branch Davidians, not all the rest of them. Furthermore, according to United Press International, protestors in front of the White House handed out copies of Moore's book in 1997 on the anniversary (19 April) of the Waco siege's end and Oklahoma City bombing that was partially inspired by the siege. According to The Philadelphia Inquirer, copies of Moore's book were found among the various books in Fort Washington, Pennsylvania, sold by right-wing and radical right vendors fearful of the end of the world, particularly the Y2K bug.
