= Charles Pace =

Leader of Branch Davidian church

Charles J. Pace (born c. 1950) is the current leader of The Branch, The Lord Our Righteousness, the supposed successor group of the Branch Davidians after 1993. According to the Toronto Star, he is from Collingwood, Canada. He joined the Branch Davidians in the 1980s, but he left before the Waco siege that destroyed the Mt. Carmel center. He claims to be the successor to David Koresh as the prophet of the Branch Davidians (though he does not use the word "prophet"). He returned to Waco, Texas, in 1994 after having left the Mount Carmel Center in the mid-1980s in order to start his own religious movement. He is trained as a reflexologist, nutritionist and colon therapist, according to the Toronto Star. A tractor reportedly amputated his foot sometime before April 2013. National Public Radio and other news sources note that he is an herbalist and gardener. He is married to Alex Pace and has two children, Michael and Angela Pace.

== Life before and during the Waco siege ==
Pace grew up in Collingwood, Ontario. At the age of eighteen, he left Collingwood to go out West on a "spiritual quest", according to the Toronto Star. In Hope, British Columbia, he met with a Seventh Day Adventist who later connected him to the Branch Davidians. He first arrived in Waco, Texas, in 1973 to meet the Branch Davidians.

Around 1984, Pace left the compound. Former Branch Davidians told The New York Times that Pace hated David Koresh. Pace claimed that Koresh "twisted" the Bible's teachings in such a way that he could not tolerate. Pace believed that David Koresh "was the means by which Satan came to impersonate the descendant of Christ". Pace reportedly also had a "falling-out" with George Roden, son of Lois Roden and contender for leader of the Branch Davidians after her death.

At the time of the siege, he led a small church in Gadsden, Alabama.

== Theology and religious leadership ==
Pace claims to be returning to the "true theology" of the Branch Davidians before David Koresh's rise to power. He insists that the original theology is similar to Messianic Judaism. He believes he is more of a successor to Lois Roden, the leader of the Branch Davidians before Koresh. Pace believes that the world will end in his lifetime, and that most of the world's population will perish unless they practice Branch Davidianism.

In 1998, The Economist reported that Pace's sect had about 10 followers other than himself. Pace sought to grow his church and install educational exhibitions about the Waco siege.

Some former Branch Davidians who were part of the group with David Koresh before the Waco siege do not recognize Charles Pace as the legitimate successor to Koresh. Sheila J. Martin, for example, similarly believes in his apocalyptic beliefs, but they do not share the same doctrine. Clive Doyle and others launched a lawsuit against Pace in order to obtain the property on which the Waco siege occurred, which they allege he is squatting, but the lack of sense of urgency and funds made it slow. On National Public Radio, Catherine Matteson, a Branch Davidian from before David Koresh, called Pace "fake". Additionally, some former Davidians fear that the "museum" Pace wishes to erect on the property will not accurately portray them and David Koresh. On the property, Pace and Amo Bishop Roden, another claimant to the successorship to the Branch Davidians, laid a marble stone "in memory of the government officers who died", according to The Times (London).
