= Waco Rising =

2023 book about the Waco siege

Waco Rising: David Koresh, the FBI, and the Birth of America's Modern Militias
- Cover
- Author: Kevin Cook
- Language: English
- Publisher: Henry Holt and Company
- Publication date: 2023
- Publication place: United States
- Pages: 288
- ISBN: 978-1-250-84052-3

Waco Rising: David Koresh, the FBI, and the Birth of America's Modern Militias is a 2023 non-fiction book by journalist Kevin Cook about the Waco siege. It was published by Henry Holt and Company.

== Synopsis ==
Cook provides a comprehensive history of the Branch Davidians, beginning with a detailed biography of David Koresh, who would become their leader. He delves into the Waco siege, focusing particularly on the experiences of those under siege at the Mt. Carmel compound. Cook also explores the siege's aftermath in depth, examining the legal battles faced by the Waco survivors, the rise of right-wing support for the Davidians, opposition to the U.S. government, and the survivors' lives in the years following the siege.

== Reception ==
Michael Rodriguez for Library Journal calls the book "[t]hrilling, evenhanded, and liable to resonate with readers to true crime and current events". Gary Day for Booklist writes that Cook does a "good job explaining how Koresh's sad saga unfolded", but he added that the "why of Koresh remains elusive". A reviewer from Publishers Weekly commented that Cook is "at his strongest when discussing the day-to-day life of the Davidians". However, the reviewer notes a lack in critical perspective of many of the eyewitness accounts in the book, especially that of Gary Noesner, a Federal Bureau of Investigation negotiator who was replaced during the Waco siege. A reviewer from Kirkus Reviews writes that the author "masterfully portrays the scope of the violence and heartbreak on all sides", and they commend Cook for addressing the militia movement through his book. In reviewing other 2023 books about the Waco siege, Eric Benson notes that Cook's book rides closest to survivor narratives of the siege like that of David Thibodeau, Sheila Martin, and Clive Doyle. Benson, however, does not believe that that makes Cook's narrative of the siege and aftermath naive or misguided, especially since Cook agrees with other scholars that the Branch Davidians caused the 19 April fire that destroyed the compound and ended the siege. Quinta Jurecic for The Washington Post commends the book for adequately addressing the legacy of the Waco siege on present-day politics like the January 6 United States Capitol attack.
