= Clive Doyle =

Australian Branch Davidian (1941–2022)

Clive Joseph Doyle (24 February 1941 – 8 June 2022) was an Australian leader in the Branch Davidian movement after the Waco siege in 1993. He was a Branch Davidian and a Davidian Seventh-day Adventist before the Waco siege. Doyle was one of nine survivors of the 19 April 1993 fire that destroyed the Mount Carmel Center at the end of the siege. He along with other survivors built a new chapel on the site of the siege in 1999.

== Early life and family ==
Doyle was born in Melbourne, Australia on 24 February 1941. His mother was a worker in a garment factory, and his father left his mother before he was born. In Australia, he was a currency printer. Doyle obtained American citizenship in 1985, according to The Dallas Morning News.

Doyle had two daughters with Deborah Doyle (nee Slawson), Shari Elayna Doyle (1 August 1974 – 19 April 1993) and Karen Elizabeth Graham (5 July 1971 – 30 March 2018). Shari died in the 19 April 1993 fire from which her father and sister escaped. Karen was living in a California property owned by the Branch Davidians when the Waco siege began. About three weeks before the 2018 anniversary service, Karen was killed in a car collision with a drunk driver in Pennsylvania. Both of his daughters were "married" to Koresh – Shari was fourteen when they "married".

== Joining the Davidian Seventh-day Adventists and Branch Davidians ==
In Melbourne, Australia, Doyle and his mother were converted from Seventh-day Adventism by an itinerant preacher named Daniel Smith to Victor Houteff's splinter religious community, called the Shepherd's Rod (later known as the Davidian Seventh-day Adventists). Doyle quit his job as an apprentice in a cabinet shop in 1958 and moved with his mother to Tasmania to spread Houteff's teachings. Eventually, he raised enough money to move to Waco, Texas in 1964.

Doyle was influential in formulating Lois Roden's theology. In 1980, she named him as an editor of SHEkinah, a Branch Davidian periodical used to disseminate ideas to others. Doyle argued, for example, that the Apostle Paul's "unknown God" in Acts 17 was known to over a billion people but the feminine Holy Spirit was known to a select few. Although, in his book he noted that he had to "wrestle" with Roden for him to finally get that the Holy Spirit was a feminine representation of Deity.

In the 1980s, when David Koresh and George Roden were conflicting over the ownership of the Mount Carmel Center, he temporarily left the group.

In 1990, Doyle worked for the Census Bureau in California taking the 1990 Census. He also reportedly worked in a gardening crew and an educational-video-producing company while with the Branch Davidians.

== Waco siege ==
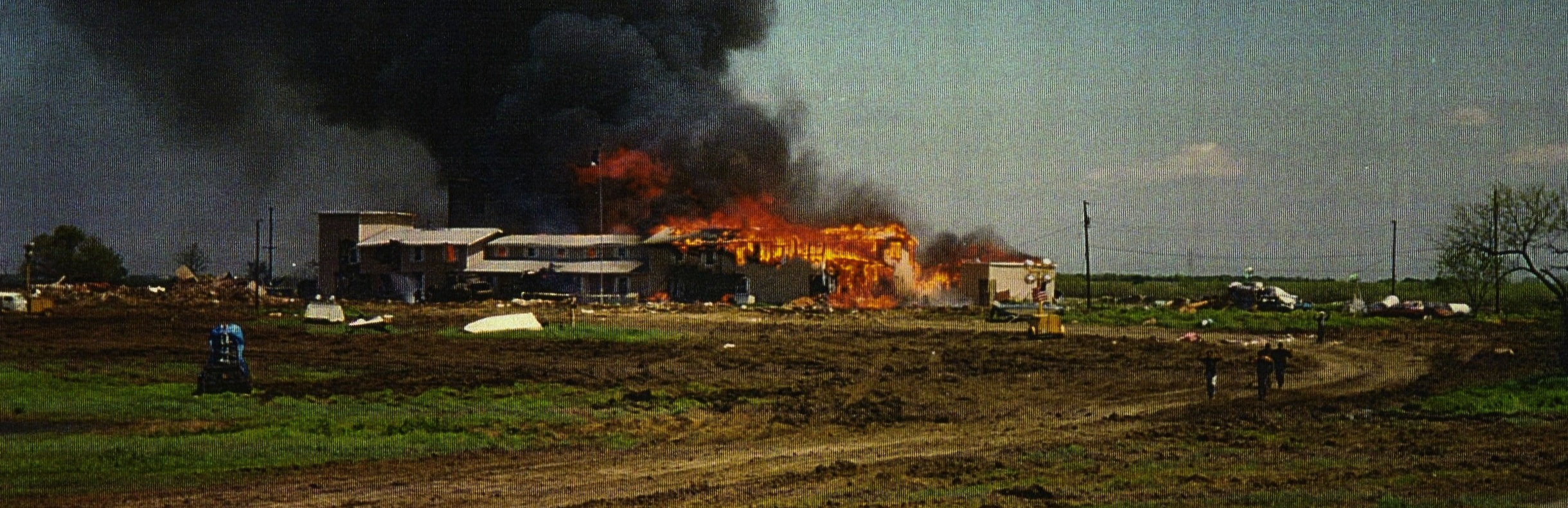
Doyle and three other Branch Davidians walk down the driveway and surrender as the building burns behind them.

Doyle was present in the Mount Carmel Center throughout the Federal Bureau of Investigation (FBI) siege. When the Bureau of Alcohol, Tobacco, and Firearms (ATF) arrived at the Center on 28 February, Doyle returned to his room on the first floor near the cafeteria. From his room, he could hear what David Koresh was telling the ATF agents as they arrived, though he is not sure of who started the fire fight.

He was one of the first people to discover Perry Jones, another Branch Davidian, who was among those shot and killed by the ATF. Jones was still alive at the time and informed Doyle that Koresh was also shot. He picked up Jones with the help of Livingston Malcolm and brought him into a room deeper into the compound so that he can avoid getting shot through the walls.

Soon after, he heard that Winston Blake was killed in the fire fight. He heard running water from the room he was in, which was strange since the compound did not have a plumbing system installed. He found Blake in his room with blood flowing on a downward angle and soaking into the carpet. He could not find a pulse on Blake's body and assumed he was dead (he was confirmed dead that day).

Doyle was responsible for an early burial of the four of six Branch Davidians killed on 28 February 1993 (the other two Branch Davidians were killed outside the compound where those inside could not obtain their bodies). He made a makeshift grave for all four in the storm shelter of the compound.

Throughout the siege, Doyle had some contact with FBI negotiators. In his book, he recalled an episode where he was promised a message from his daughter, Karen, who was in California, but instead got an FBI agent telling him "She just wanted to know how you are doing".

At around 6:00 am local time on 19 April 1993, the FBI administered CS gas throughout the building to drive out the Branch Davidians. Doyle retrieved a gas mask and multiple layers to protect his skin, though his hands were uncovered.

Around noon, he heard someone yell out that the building was on fire. He remembered discussing the possibility of being shot by federal agents if he and others left the compound through a hole in a wall at the back of the chapel that a Combat Engineering Vehicle left. Smoke poured into the chapel, and Doyle and the others there ran out of the hole in the wall. He felt the coat he was wearing melt on his back, according to his Congressional testimony in 1995 as reported by the New York Times.

In a written statement to the U.S. Congress in 1995, he stated that he was unaware of the cause of the 19 April fire; however, he had previously told Texas Rangers in an interrogation that the fire was started inside the compound by fuel in Coleman lanterns. New York Times reported that Doyle claimed he never actually said that to the Texas Rangers.

== Aftermath of the siege ==
Doyle was sent to Parkland Memorial Hospital in Dallas, Texas, immediately after surviving the conflagration, suffering from second- and third-degree burns to his hands. According to CNN, he required skin grafts to heal from the burns. After treatment, he was held in pretrial detention for one year to face charges of murder conspiracy. In a 1994 trial with other Branch Davidians in San Antonio, he was acquitted of all charges against him.

In 1998, Doyle and other Branch Davidian survivors attempted to erect a museum on the siege's site but encountered trouble with Amo Bishop Roden and the Christ the World of Truth. In 1999, Doyle, other survivors, and volunteers rebuilt a chapel on the siege site. A young Alex Jones (who later founded Infowars.com) was among those who volunteered to help rebuild the chapel, reportedly fundraising and rallying others.

After Timothy McVeigh car-bombed a federal office building in Oklahoma City in 1995, Doyle noted in 2001 – the year of McVeigh's execution – that he saw "no honor" in his actions and that "Tim McVeigh is not any sort of champion from our [the Branch Davidian survivors'] point of view". Additionally, Doyle expressed fear and concern about the fixation of the far-right and white supremacist groups on the Waco siege to the New York Times in 2015.

Doyle spoke out against Charles Pace and his claim to represent the Branch Davidian church after returning to Mount Carmel in 1994. Doyle reportedly refused him access to mementos used in the museum he built on the site in the late 1990s and early 2000s.

In 2012, Doyle published a memoir with Catherine Wessinger and Matthew D. Wittmer called A Journey to Waco. Wessinger has produced extensive oral histories from Doyle and other Branch Davidians.

Doyle was an active participant in various memorial and anniversary services for the end of the Waco siege.

== Personal life ==
In 1998, New York Times reported that Doyle worked at a store called Waco Natural Foods where he managed the herb displays. In 2011, CNN reported he worked in a thrift store in Waco.

Doyle remained faithful to David Koresh, the Branch Davidian's leader who died in the 19 April fire, even after his death. In 2020, Doyle told Mirror (London) that he believed that God was responsible for the siege and not Koresh or anyone else. Doyle believed that Koresh will be resurrected.

== Death ==
Doyle died of pancreatic cancer on 8 June 2022, in Waco, aged 81.
