= Waco: David Koresh, the Branch Davidians, and a Legacy of Rage =

Book about the Waco siege

- Cover
- Author: Jeff Guinn
- Language: English
- Genre: Non-fiction
- Publisher: Simon & Schuster
- Publication date: 2023
- Publication place: New York
- Pages: 400
- ISBN: 9781982186104
- OCLC: 1330895674

Waco: David Koresh, the Branch Davidians, and a Legacy of Rage is a 2023 non-fiction book by journalist Jeff Guinn about the 1993 Waco siege. It was published by Simon & Schuster.

== Synopsis ==
Guinn covers the history of U.S. governmental surveillance of the Branch Davidians, primarily from the Bureau of Alcohol, Tobacco, and Firearms (ATF). He details the ATF raid on the Mount Carmel Center on 28 February 1993, and the ensuing siege by the Federal Bureau of Investigation. He also touches on the aftermath and cultural and political impact of the Waco siege, with special focus on the 1995 Oklahoma City bombing and the January 6 United States Capitol attack.

== Reception ==
Kathy Sexton from Booklist wrote that the book is "extremely well done and thought-provoking", but she notes too that readers "may be left wanting more on the provocative idea of Waco's continued influence". A reviewer at Publishers Weekly called the book "comprehensive and judicious". The reviewer commented that it is a "sobering account" of the Waco siege. Another reviewer at Kirkus Reviews called the book an "engrossing report on David Koresh and the endurance of cult culture". Philip Jenkins adds that the book is "an essential addition to any collection of books" addressing the Waco siege.

Jenkins criticizes Guinn for not addressing the culture of the 1980s and 1990s that contributed to the siege, like the persistence of moral panics. In addition, Jenkins notes that the press coverage of the siege was under-covered in Guinn's account.
