= Bearden =

== Places ==
Bearden may refer to:

- Bearden, Arkansas
- Bearden, Oklahoma
- Bearden, Knoxville, Tennessee

== Other ==
- Bearden (surname)
