= Wayne Martin (Branch Davidian) =

Lawyer and Branch Davidian (1950–1993)

- Born: Douglas Wayne Martin; June 30, 1950; Queens, New York City, New York, U.S.
- Died: April 19, 1993 (aged 42); Mount Carmel Center, Texas
- Occupations: Lawyer, librarian
- Parent(s): Joseph Martin, Helen Martin

Douglas Wayne Martin (June 30, 1950 – April 19, 1993) was an American Branch Davidian and attorney who left the Seventh-day Adventist Church. He worked as an attorney in multiple fields, including contract, child custody, and real estate law, and provided the proceeds to the Branch Davidians. He was nominally married to Sheila Judith Martin, another Branch Davidian, but she was "carnally" married to David Koresh, the Branch Davidian leader. Wayne and Sheila had seven children, four of whom died in the 1993 fire: Wayne Joseph, 20; Anita, 18; Sheila Renee, 15; and Lisa Martin, 13. Sheila Martin, who left Mount Carmel Center on March 21 in the middle of the siege, eventually won custody over the three surviving children: James, Daniel, and Kimberly Martin. Wayne Martin was present at Mount Carmel Center when the February 28, 1993, raid occurred. He was the first person in the compound to call 9-1-1 to local authorities and asked to call off the raid for risk of harming women and children. He was considered the second- or third-in-command at Mt. Carmel, behind or equal to Steve Schneider. He died in the April 19, 1993, fire with three of his children. Wayne Martin was a character in the 2018 miniseries Waco, played by Demore Barnes.

== Early life, education, and career ==
Martin was born to Joseph and Helen Martin in Queens, New York City, on June 30, 1950, where he grew up. He attended City College of the City University of New York system as an undergraduate history major, where he made the Dean's list. He received a Juris Doctor from Harvard Law School in 1977, and he worked as an assistant professor at North Carolina Central University law school for seven years starting in 1978. He also worked as a law librarian at North Carolina Central University until 1985. He also received a master's degree in business administration from Columbia University, according to The Dallas Morning News. He was admitted to the Texas Bar in 1988, and he was also a member of the Pennsylvania Bar.

He was friends with Lawrence Johnson, a lawyer, Waco City Council member, and president of the McLennan County chapter of the National Association for the Advancement of Colored People (NAACP), for approximately five years.

Martin joined the Branch Davidians in 1985 when introduced to them through his wife Sheila J. Martin.

== Waco siege and death ==
Martin was the first person to call 9-1-1 when the Bureau of Alcohol, Tobacco, and Firearms (ATF) began a raid of the Mt. Carmel compound on February 28, 1993. He called at 9:48 am local time (UTC–5:00). In the call, he claimed to Larry Lynch, a McLennan County sheriff's deputy, that the ATF shot first. Martin later that same morning called Lawrence Johnson to ask him to contact the media about the raid, and he sent Johnson money to reimburse clients he could not represent while besieged in the Mt. Carmel compound. He also spoke to Gary Coker, a Waco lawyer who represented Branch Davidians, before the Federal Bureau of Investigation (FBI) cut the telephone lines. Later, by at least March 6, 1993, Coker spoke with Martin to discuss a film production deal that Hollywood executives offered the Branch Davidians after the start of the siege.

Of all the people FBI negotiators spoke to on a Hostage-Rescue-Team-provided telephone, Martin was one of two people who the FBI spoke to face-to-face (the other being Steve Schneider).

Martin died of smoke inhalation and burns in the auditorium area of Mount Carmel Center, sometimes reported as a "concrete bunker." His body was identified using dental records.

== Impact on criminal and civil trials ==
Eleven Branch Davidians stood trial over their involvement in the shootout on the February 28, 1993, raid that started the siege. Martin's 9-1-1 call was used as evidence in favor of the eleven Branch Davidians, who argued they fired at the ATF agents in self-defense. The eleven defendants and their legal team used the call as evidence that the ATF agents shot at the Branch Davidians first, and as such they returned fire in self-defense.

In addition to the criminal trial, surviving Branch Davidians brought a multimillion-dollar lawsuit against the federal government for the wrongful deaths in the botched February 28 ATF raid and April 19, 1993, fire. The tape of Martin's initial call to 9-1-1 and Larry Lynch was shown to an advisory jury in an effort to ascertain if the Branch Davidians were returning fire in self-defense and if the ATF agents were negligent in a random use of force.

== See also ==
- Waco siege
- Branch Davidians
- Waco (miniseries)
