= Sheila J. Martin =

American Branch Davidian (born 1947)

Sheila Judith Martin (born 1947) is an American Branch Davidian and a survivor of the Waco siege. She was the wife of Douglas Wayne Martin, a Harvard-educated lawyer, who died in the April 19, 1993, fire that destroyed Mount Carmel Center. Four out of her seven children died in the fire: Wayne Joseph, 20; Anita, 18; Sheila Renee, 15; and Lisa Martin, 13. In September 1993, she received custody of James Martin (1982–1998) who has cerebral palsy and is blind because of a meningitis infection at 4 months old. By 1994, she obtained custody in Texas state court of her two other children – Daniel (born c. 1987) and Kimberly (born c. 1989).

Martin grew up in Boston, Massachusetts. Her African-American family attended services at an Episcopal Church, but she became interested in Seventh-day Adventism through boarders who rented rooms from her parents. She moved to New York City and met Douglas Wayne Martin. She married him and had seven children with him in total.

In the miniseries Waco (2018), she was played by Darcel Danielle.

== Joining the Branch Davidians and the Waco siege ==
Reportedly, Sheila Martin first heard of the Branch Davidians under Benjamin Roden in the 1960s. But Martin first began contact with David Koresh, the contemporary leader of the Branch Davidians, in 1982. After James Martin was disabled from a meningitis infection soon after his birth, Martin sought consultation and found it through Koresh via their conversations over the telephone. In 1985, she and Wayne Martin moved to Texas from Durham, North Carolina; they began living in the Mount Carmel Center in 1988. She lived in a bus at the Palestine, Texas camp, where many Branch Davidians lived while a dispute of leadership occurred between Koresh and George Roden over Mount Carmel Center.

Martin was in the compound on February 28, 1993, the day the Bureau of Alcohol, Tobacco, and Firearms (ATF) attempted to conduct a raid of the Mount Carmel Center and serve search warrants and an arrest warrant on David Koresh.

Martin left the Mount Carmel Center on March 21, 1993, with her three youngest children. She was immediately held as a material witness by federal authorities including the Federal Bureau of Investigation (FBI) in a hotel acting as a halfway house. Her three children were put into the foster care system until she regained custody of James Martin in September 1993. She testified in the trial of eleven Branch Davidians in San Antonio saying that the February 28 shootout was not planned and there was no conspiracy to murder federal agents.

== Life after the Waco siege ==
In 1994, Shelia Martin sent a notice to the ATF that she intended to sue for US$140 million. In 2000, she, among others, was represented in a wrongful death lawsuit of US$675 million by Michael Caddell along with former U.S. attorney general Ramsey Clark, but the jury ruled against the Branch Davidians on July 14, 2000.

In 1998, Martin assisted in building a museum on the site of the siege to commemorate those who died there.

In 2009, Martin wrote a memoir called When They Were Mine: Memoirs of a Branch Davidian Wife and Mother, edited by Catherine Wessinger who has conducted extensive oral histories on Branch Davidians.

According to Esquire, as of 2020 Martin lives in the Waco area. Martin, along with survivor Clive Doyle, still believe that David Koresh was the Lamb of God. From at least 2013 until his death in 2022, they met every Saturday for Bible study.
