= The White Lions =

- Japanese VHS cover
- Directed by: Mel Stuart
- Written by: Corey Blechman; Peter Dixon
- Produced by: Paul Freeman; Howard Lipstone
- Starring: Michael York
- Cinematography: Robert Jessop
- Edited by: Art Stafford
- Music by: Malcolm Dodds
- Production company: Alan Landsburg Productions
- Distributed by: Universal Pictures
- Release date: January 1, 1981
- Running time: 97 minutes
- Country: United States
- Language: English

The White Lions is a 1981 American drama film directed by Mel Stuart and starring Michael York and Glynnis O'Connor.

== Premise ==
A college professor, his wife, and daughter go to the wilds of Africa to live and study the rare white lions of the region.

== Cast ==
- Michael York as Chris McBride
- Glynnis O'Connor as Jeannie McBride
- Donald Moffat as Vreeland
- J.A. Preston as Aniel
- Roger E. Mosley as John Kani
- Lauri Lynn Myers as Laura McBride
- Tom Taylor as Mr. Gleason
- Louis Heshimu White III as Intern
- Larry Drake as Fiske
- Norma Young as Prof. Thorndike
- David Haney as Dr. Ford
- Columbia Dowell as Mrs. Gleason
- Charles Pace as Ranger
- Hugh Gorrian as Dr. Uffner
- Sally Norvell as Sarah (as Sarah Norvell)
- Keith Alcorn as College student (uncredited)

== See also ==
- List of American films of 1981
