= Sheila Martin (disambiguation) =

Sheila or Sheilah Martin may refer to:

- Sheila Ann Martin (born 1943), a Canadian politician
- Sheila Judith Martin (born 1947), a Branch Davidian
- Sheilah L. Martin, a Canadian supreme court justice
