= Benjamin Roden =

American religious leader (1902–1978)

- Born: January 5, 1902; Bearden, Indian Territory, U.S.
- Died: October 22, 1978 (aged 76); Temple, Texas, U.S.
- Occupation(s): Author, Sabbath teacher, Seventh Day Adventists Reformer
- Known for: Founder of "The Branch"; "The Branch" leadership 1955–1978; Seventh Day Adventist Reform Movement
- Spouse: Lois Irene Scott
- Children: 6, including George Buchanan Roden

Benjamin Lloyd Roden (January 5, 1902 – October 22, 1978) was an American religious leader and the prime organizer of the Branch Davidian Seventh-day Adventist Association.

== Early life ==
Benjamin Roden was born on January 5, 1902, in Bearden, Oklahoma (in what was then the Indian Territory). His parents, James Buchanan Roden and Hattie Roden, had five other children.

Little is known of Roden's early life but he grew up on a farm in Bearden and attended high school there before going to a teacher's college and then practicing as a teacher for a brief period. Thereafter, he spent some time working on oil fields, first in Oklahoma and later in Odessa, Texas.

Roden married Lois I. Scott on February 12, 1937. With Scott he had two daughters and four sons, including George Roden.

== Early religious adherence ==
Details of Roden's early religious views are as sketchy as those of his secular life. However, an obituary says that he joined "the Christian Church" in the same year that he married, although his journey to that church and the extent to which it involved change is uncertain. Kenneth Newport, a professor of Christian Thought, notes that "like many other converted Jews ... he carried with him into Christianity a good deal of his Jewishness", giving as an example of this the importance that Roden later attached to the Jewish festivals of Purim and Passover.

By 1940, the Rodens were members of the Seventh-day Adventist Church (SDA) in Kilgore, Texas. It is possible that the appeal of the SDA lay at least in part in its similarities to some aspects of Judaism, such as practising the sabbath on the seventh day and abiding by the dietary laws of the Old Testament, but in addition the couple had been given Bible Readings for the Home Circle as a wedding present by Lois's mother. That book was a publication of the SDA and it is probable, although not certain, that somewhere in Lois's family there was already an involvement with that church.

The Rodens later moved from the church at Kilgore to that at Odessa, where Ben became a head elder. Somewhere around this time, in the early- to mid-1940s, the couple became influenced by the Shepherd's Rod movement, which had splintered from the SDA, and probably visited its base at the Mount Carmel Center, near Waco, Texas, even if only briefly. They were disfellowshiped from their SDA church, which caused them offence because they had helped to finance the church building and felt that they therefore had a right to use it. Various accounts exist of a stand-off between Lois and the church, with her occupying it for several days and receiving supplies from Ben and their son, George.

== Shepherd's Rod ==
Ben and Lois Roden continued their involvement with the Shepherd's Rod, although there is again a scarcity of reliable information. They visited Mt Carmel for several months in 1953 and were there again in 1955 at the time when Victor Houteff, the leader of The Rod, died. It seems that he sought to become Houteff's successor as leader but that role went to Florence, the widow of Victor.

== Death ==
Roden died in October 1978, after which Lois led the sect until the emergence of David Koresh in the mid-1980s.
