= Tom McBride (actor) =

American actor (1952–1995)

- Publicity Photo of Tom McBride
- Born: October 7, 1952; Charleston, West Virginia
- Died: September 24, 1995 (aged 42); New York City
- Occupations: Actor, model
- Years active: 1981–1995

Tom McBride (October 7, 1952 − September 24, 1995) was an American photographer, model, and actor. He starred in the 1981 horror film Friday the 13th Part 2 as Mark. He also had a role in the 1985 movie Remo Williams: The Adventure Begins. His only TV guest appearance was on the TV series Highway to Heaven. On Broadway, he appeared in the play Fifth of July near the end of its run. McBride, an openly gay man, died in 1995 due to complications from AIDS, only two weeks prior to his forty-third birthday. A documentary by director Jay Corcoran titled Life & Death on the A-List followed McBride in the final months of his life.

McBride is also remembered for his modeling career as one of the famous handsome male models in Winston Cigarette billboard ads in the 1980s.

== Filmography ==
=== Film ===
Year	Title	Role	Notes
1981	Friday the 13th Part 2	Mark	
1985	Remo Williams: The Adventure Begins	"Jim" in soap opera	
1997	White Lies	Dan Belden	(final film role)

=== Television ===
Year	Title	Role	Notes
1986	Highway to Heaven	Kevin	Episode: "Jonathan Smith Goes to Washington"
1987	Gimme a Break!		Episode: "Parents' Week: Part 2"
