= J. A. Preston =

American actor (born 1932)

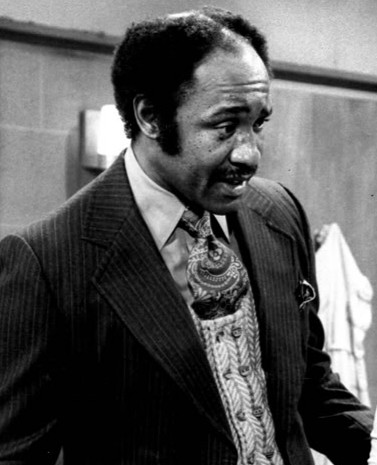
- Preston as Walter Ingles on Good Times, circa 1975
- Born: James Allen Preston; November 13, 1932 (age 93); Washington, D.C., U.S.
- Education: North Carolina College
- Years active: 1969–2006
- Known for: Ozzie Cleveland – Hill Street Blues
- Spouse: Merilyn Alsop (m. 1957; div. 1972)
- Children: 3

James Allen Preston (born November 13, 1932) is a retired American actor. Preston is best known for portraying judge Colonel Randolph in the movie A Few Good Men and for his recurring role as Ozzie Cleveland on the NBC prime-time television series Hill Street Blues. He played Conn MacCleary in the movie Remo Williams: The Adventure Begins.

== Biography ==
=== Life and career ===
Preston was born November 13, 1932, in Washington, D.C. In addition to his role on Hill Street Blues, Preston is also known for his roles as Leo Daltry in Dallas, Richard Matthews in Santa Barbara, court-martial judge Col. J. A. Randolph, USMC in the 1992 film A Few Good Men, and the minor but important role of a USAF major general in Air Force One (1997). He was a series regular in the short-lived CBS sitcom All's Fair which ran just one season (1976–77). In it he played an assistant to conservative newspaper columnist Richard Barrington (played by Richard Crenna). Preston also appeared on the NBC television series The A-Team as a judge (Col. Thomas Milo) presiding over a military tribunal convened to try the A-Team. He appeared in the series Good Times in the late 1975 episode, "Willona's Dilemma". He also appeared in three episodes of Martin as Gina's (Tisha Campbell-Martin) father Dr. Cliff Waters. He was also on the Season 1, Episode 11 of Law & Order, "Out of the Half-Light" as Congressman Ronald Eaton.

== Personal life ==
Preston was married to Merilyn Alsop from 1957 until divorcing in 1972. Together, Preston and Alsop had three children before their divorce: Scott, Dominique, and James Preston.

== Selected filmography ==
- 1971 Mississippi Summer
- 1973 The Spook Who Sat by the Door as Dawson
- 1976 Two-Minute Warning as Policeman #1
- 1976 Silver Streak as The Waiter (uncredited)
- 1979 Real Life as Dr. Ted Cleary
- 1979 Roots: The Next Generations as College President Harper
- 1979 Americathon as Morty
- 1980 High Noon, Part II: The Return of Will Kane as Alonzo
- 1981 Body Heat as Detective Oscar Grace
- 1981 The White Lions as Aniel
- 1985 Remo Williams: The Adventure Begins as CURE Agent Conn "Mac" MacCleary
- 1990 Fire Birds as General Olcott
- 1990 Narrow Margin as Chief Deputy District Attorney Martin Larner
- 1992 Captain Ron as Magistrate
- 1992 A Few Good Men as Judge Colonel Julius Alexander Randolph
- 1997 Contact as Senator (uncredited)
- 1997 Air Force One as USAF Major General Samuel Greely (uncredited)
- 2006 Sweet Deadly Dreams as Mott

== Television ==
- 1975 All in the Family as "Black Elmo" Bridgewater (Season 6, Episode 3 Archie, the Donor)
- 1975 Good Times as Walter Ingles (Season 3, Episode 10)
- 1978 Wonder Woman as Jazreel (Season 2/Episode 15)
- 1979 Hart to Hart as Lab Director (Season 1)
- 1982 Little House on the Prairie as Sam Terhune (Season 8/Episode 16)
- 1982-85 Hill Street Blues as Police Commander, later Mayor Ozzie Cleveland (13 episodes)
- 1984 Punky Brewster as Judge William J. Murphy (Season 1/Episode 3)
- 1984 ‘’Gimme a Break!’’ as Preston Pomeroy (Season 4/Episode 8)
- 1986 Moonlighting as Dr. Nealy (Season 2/Episode 13)
- 1986 The A-Team as the judge - Col. Thomas Mylowe (season 5/episode 2)
- 1986 Magnum P.I as Police Lieutenant Sam McKee (season7/episode 1)
- 1988 Hunter as Rhodes (Season 5)
- 1990 Law & Order as Congressman Ronald Eaton (Season 1/Episode 11)
- 1991 Father Dowling Mysteries as Lt. Peter Johnson (Season 3/Episode 22)
- 1992 Jake and the Fatman as Mickey Daytona
- 1992 Martin – played the recurring role of Dr. Cliff Waters in three episodes: "The Parents Are Coming" in Season 1 (#7), "Thanks for Nothing" in Season 2 (#13) and also "Wedding Bell Blues" in Season 3 (#26)
- 1992 Tales from the Crypt as Harry (Season 4/Episode 14)
- 1993 The Jackie Thomas Show as Mr. Watson (Season 1/Episode 11)
- 1994 Lois & Clark: The New Adventures of Superman as General Zeitlin (Season 1/Episode 12)
- 1994 Empty Nest as Roland (Season 6/Episode 23)
- 1995 SeaQuest 2032 as Charles Ford (Season 2/Episode 11)
- 1996 Chicago Hope as Judge Rodney Helpurn
- 1997 The Sentinel as Mel Wilkenson (Season 2/Episode 16)
- 1997 Clueless as Benjamin Davenport (Season 3/Episode 62)

== Theatre ==
- Henry IV, Part 1 – Delacorte Theater (1968)
- Henry IV, Part 2 – Delacorte Theater (1968)
- Freeman – American Place Theatre (1973)
