= Lois Roden =

American sect leader (1916–1986)

- Born: August 1, 1916; Stone, Montana, U.S.
- Died: November 10, 1986 (aged 70); Texas, U.S.
- Citizenship: American
- Occupations: Author, Sabbath teacher, religious reformer
- Known for: "The Branch" leadership 1978–1986
- Notable work: Shekinah
- Spouse: Benjamin Lloyd Roden
- Children: 6, including George Buchanan Roden
- Awards: Excellence in Media Angel Awards, The Dove Foundation award

Lois Irene Scott Roden (August 1, 1916 – November 10, 1986) was an American religious leader who was president of the Branch Davidian Seventh-day Adventist Church, an apocalyptic Christian sect which her husband, Benjamin Roden founded. The sect began in Texas in 1955 as a secession from the Shepherd's Rod movement led by Victor T. Houteff, itself a secession from the Seventh-day Adventist Church.

== Work ==
Contemporaneous with the surge of the Feminist Movement in the 1970s (and corresponding with the egalitarian teachings of many Adventist sects), Roden asserted that women, like men, were made in the image and likeness of God, and that they thereby hold a position of co-dominion with man in all things. She believed the Holy Spirit is a female entity. In 1977, a year before Benjamin Roden died, Lois said she had received a vision of the Holy Spirit, describing it as "a silver angel, shimmering in the night. It was a feminine representation of this angel. I had been studying Revelation 18 and it said this mighty angel was to come down to earth and that was my understanding". She asserted as proof her ideas that the Hebrew word for Spirit (ruach) is feminine, and that Jews regard the concept of "Holy Spirit" and the "Divine Presence" ("shekhinah"...both of which are "feminine" words in Hebrew) are one and the same.

In 1979, along with publishing many related tracts, Roden began publishing a magazine entitled Shekinah. The magazine explored the issues of the feminine aspect of the Godhead and women in the ministry of the Church. Shekinah magazine contained Lois' commentaries as well as reprints of news articles and excerpts of publications from a variety of Christian, Jewish, and other sources which addressed women's place in the world of religion. She received minor awards and commendations for the magazine from religious groups and individuals. Among them were an Award of Excellence from Excellence in Media Angel Awards, and another from The Dove Foundation.

== Death ==
From 1977 until the death of her husband Benjamin in 1978, she was co-president of the Branch Davidian Seventh-day Adventist Church along with him. When Benjamin Roden died, Lois remained as the sole lawful president until her death from breast cancer in 1986. Early in her presidency her leadership was challenged by her son, George Roden in a leadership election in 1979, and in late 1983 by Vernon Howell (from 1990, formally known as David Koresh). Both challengers drew away supporters from the congregation, scaring away others by their reliance on the force of arms to advance their aims. Some claim that, before Koresh challenged her leadership, he and Roden (who was then in her late 60s) had an affair, which Koresh justified by claiming that God had chosen him to father a child with her, who would be the Chosen One.
