= Waco: Madman or Messiah =

2018 documentary film by Christopher Spencer

- Directed by: Christopher Spencer
- Country of origin: United States
- Original language: English
- No. of seasons: 1
- No. of episodes: 2

Original release
- Network: A&E
- Release: January 28 – January 29, 2018

Waco: Madman or Messiah is a 2018 American documentary film directed by Christopher Spencer about the Branch Davidians and David Koresh in the years leading up to and including the 51-day stand-off with the FBI which ended with the 1993 raid on Mount Carmel, Texas. The four-hour, two-part documentary special premiered on January 28, 2018.
