= Remo Williams: The Adventure Begins =

1985 film by Guy Hamilton

- Theatrical release poster
- Directed by: Guy Hamilton
- Screenplay by: Christopher Wood
- Based on: The Destroyer by Warren Murphy and Richard Sapir
- Produced by: Larry Spiegel
- Starring: Fred Ward; Joel Grey; Wilford Brimley; J. A. Preston; George Coe; Charles Cioffi; Kate Mulgrew
- Cinematography: Andrew Laszlo
- Edited by: Mark Melnick
- Music by: Craig Safan
- Production company: Dick Clark Productions
- Distributed by: Orion Pictures
- Release date: October 11, 1985
- Running time: 116 minutes
- Country: United States
- Language: English
- Budget: $15 million
- Box office: $14.4 million

Remo Williams: The Adventure Begins, also released as Remo: Unarmed and Dangerous, is a 1985 American action-adventure film directed by Guy Hamilton. The film featured Fred Ward, Joel Grey, J. A. Preston, Wilford Brimley, and Kate Mulgrew.

The character is based on The Destroyer pulp paperback series, featuring the character Remo Williams. It fared poorly in theaters and received mixed reviews from critics, although it did earn Joel Grey a Golden Globe nomination. The film and a 1988 television pilot, Remo Williams: The Prophecy, both credited Dick Clark as executive producer. The film was supposed to be the first of a series based on The Destroyer series of novels. A significant setpiece within the film takes place at the Statue of Liberty, which was surrounded by scaffolding for its centenary restoration during this period.

== Plot ==
Sam Makin is a tough Brooklyn, New York City street cop and Vietnam-era Marine Corps veteran. He is unwillingly recruited as an assassin for a secret United States organization, CURE. The recruitment is through a bizarre method: his death is faked and he is given a new face and a new name. Rechristened "Remo Williams" (after the name and location of the manufacturer of the bedpan in Makin's hospital room), his face is surgically altered and he is trained to be a human killing machine by his aged, derisive and impassive Korean martial arts master Chiun.

Though Remo's training is extremely rushed by Chiun's standards, Remo learns seemingly impossible skills such as dodging bullets and running on water and wet concrete. Chiun teaches Remo a Korean martial art named Sinanju (the "Sun Source" of all martial arts). Remo's instruction is interrupted when he is sent by CURE to investigate a corrupt weapons procurement program within the U.S. Army.

== Cast ==
- Fred Ward as Officer Samuel Edward "Sam" Makin / CURE Agent Remo Williams
- Joel Grey as Master of Sinanju Chiun
- Wilford Brimley as CURE Director Harold W. Smith
- J. A. Preston as CURE Agent Conn "Mac" MacCleary
- George Coe as General Scott Watson
- Charles Cioffi as George Grove
- Kate Mulgrew as Major Rayner Fleming
- Michael Pataki as Jim Wilson
- Reginald VelJohnson as EMT
- Jon Polito as Zack
- Gene LeBell as "Red"
- Sebastian Ligarde as Private Johnson
- Tom McBride as Soap opera "Jim"
- Suzanne Snyder as Soap opera "Nurse"
- William Hickey as Coney Island Barker
- Patrick Kilpatrick as Stone
- Roger Cudney as Captain Young

== Production ==
=== Development ===
Orion Pictures, a studio run by the people who had previously been executives at United Artists, was open about their vision for the film, seeing it as the first in a series that would create "a red, white and blue-collar Bond". They signed Ward to star in three movies in the envisioned series.

Orion hired veterans of the Bond series to work on the film, English director Guy Hamilton (Goldfinger, Live and Let Die) and screenwriter Christopher Wood (The Spy who Loved Me, Moonraker).

=== Filming ===
For the Statue of Liberty scenes, a replica of the Statue's torso, head and arm was built in Mexico. The shots of the replica were intercut with footage shot at the real Statue of Liberty. On the casting of the white actor Joel Grey, who went through four and a half hours of make-up every day to look like an elderly Korean, producer Larry Spiegel claimed "We assumed, of course, that we would be using an oriental actor. We couldn't find one and then I thought of Grey." This casting was highly controversial.

Ward performed most of the stunts himself including the scene on the giant ferris wheel shot on the Wonder Wheel located at Deno's Wonder Wheel Amusement Park in Coney Island, Brooklyn.

"I don't like to intellectualize a role," said Ward. "I just think there are a lot of places to go with Remo. His relationship with Chiun has just begun."

The "Mount Promise proving grounds" set was built near Popocatépetl Volcano, Puebla, Mexico.

=== Music ===
The soundtrack features an instrumental score written by composer Craig Safan, released by Perseverance Records on CD on August 7, 2006, and later reissued by Intrada Records. However, the title song, Remo's Theme (What If), written and sung by Styx member Tommy Shaw, is not included on that album. Shaw released the song as a solo artist on his 1985 album What If.

== Release ==
=== Critical reception ===
The film received generally mixed reviews from critics. On Rotten Tomatoes it has an approval rating of 44% based on 18 reviews.

The Los Angeles Times noted that Hamilton and Wood's result while "downplaying the violence and uplifting the humor, have delivered a welcome and breezy alternative to the mayhem and genocide of Rambo and Commando."

=== Box office ===
Remo Williams: The Adventure Begins... opened on October 11, 1985, and earned $3,376,971 in its opening weekend, ranking #4 at the United States box office. By the end of its run, the film grossed $14,393,902 in the domestic box office. This dashed hopes for a series.

In an interview, screenwriter Christopher Wood expressed his opinion on the film's lack of success at the box office. He questioned the choice of Fred Ward, who he thought was a good actor but not leading man material, saying he thought Ed Harris, who was up for the role, might have had more appeal. He went on to say "I had also written a slam bang action finale that was cut for budgetary reasons. That didn’t help."

=== Accolades ===
The film was nominated for the Academy Award for Best Makeup at the 58th Academy Awards, but lost to Mask.
