= Waco: American Apocalypse =

- Genre: Documentary
- Directed by: Tiller Russell
- Starring: David Koresh; Lee Hancock; Heather Jones; Gary Noesner; Bob Ricks; Kathy Schroeder; David Thibodeau; Chris Whitcomb
- Music by: Peter Gregson
- Country of origin: United States
- Original language: English
- No. of seasons: 1
- No. of episodes: 3

Production
- Executive producers: Jeff Hasler; Brian Lovett; Dane Reiley; Tiller Russell; Greg Tillman; Edwin Zane
- Production location: Waco, TX
- Editors: James Carroll; Rick Milewski
- Production companies: Looseworld; Original Productions; The Cut; Tillerman Films

Original release
- Network: Netflix
- Release: March 22, 2023

Waco: American Apocalypse is an American documentary television miniseries about the Waco siege in 1993 between the US federal government and the Branch Davidians, led by David Koresh. It was released on Netflix on March 22, 2023, coinciding with the 30th anniversary of the siege.

== Synopsis ==
The three-part documentary series tells the story of the Waco siege in 1993. The 51-day standoff between the Branch Davidians and the FBI and ATF ended with the deaths of 86 people, and the destruction of the compound in a fire.

== Episodes ==
No.	Title	Directed by	Original release date
1	"In the Beginning..."	Tiller Russell	22 March 2023
2	"Children of God"	Tiller Russell	22 March 2023
3	"Fire"	Tiller Russell	22 March 2023

== Production ==
The docuseries is directed by Tiller Russell and produced by Original Productions. Netflix describes it as "immersive" and featuring "cutting-edge visual technology" as well as raw news footage that was never broadcast. It features videotapes filmed inside the FBI's Hostage Negotiation Command Post, raw news footage, FBI wiretap recordings, and interviews with participants including one of Koresh's spiritual wives, the last child released from the compound alive, an FBI sniper, the FBI's chief hostage negotiator, journalists covering the story, and members of the ATF tactical team.

== Release ==
The series features three 50-minute episodes, and was released on Netflix on March 22, 2023, coinciding with the 30th anniversary of the siege.

== Reception ==
Lucy Mangan of The Guardian gave the documentary series 3 out of 5 stars, calling the survivors' stories "moving" but concluding that it "settles for spectacle over insight."

John Anderson of The Wall Street Journal wrote, "For all its occasionally awkward sentimentality, director Tiller Russell's new Netflix series benefits from a long-range perspective that supports its central thesis - that the unnecessary calamity of Waco was due to the inability, or outright refusal, of one U.S. government entity to listen to another."

Brian Lowry of CNN wrote that, "Perhaps foremost, Russell’s stark storytelling lets the video and participants speak for themselves, in contrast to much of the florid brand of true crime that has found a home on Netflix. That economical approach strips away the finger-pointing that followed the tragic loss of life at Waco and zero in on the roots of what went wrong, and to what extent it might have been avoidable. The answers aren’t always clear or what one might expect, but as such documentaries go, the effect is a frequently riveting view of an American Apocalypse, then and now.

Nick Allen of RogerEbert.com wrote that the series in its wiser moments, "makes clear just how unusual this scenario was for armed forces and rapt media", and says that it only offers "fuzzy hindsight" and it "does not suggest we’ve established a more tactful way to understand these experiences but found another flashy way to package a sensational true story."

Richard Roeper of the Chicago Sun-Times wrote, "while it’s impossible to satisfy everyone and nail down every single essential truth about what happened over the course of those 51 days, Waco: American Apocalypse director Tiller Russell... does a consistently solid job of giving voice to the story from a myriad of sides, from federal agents to Branch Davidians to journalists who covered the story." Roeper concluded "Thirty years later, it’s still a shock to the system."

Chris Vognar of Rolling Stone wrote that the docuseries "tells this story from seemingly every side, drilling deep into the specifics if not always the bigger picture... The societal impact, particularly the surge of often violent anti-government fervor that grew from the events in Waco, is vitally important... Through interviews with all parties and never-before-seen footage, [the director] wants to explore the facts, through all the fog of war and vehement disagreement. And he succeeds more often than not."

Joel Keller of Decider wrote that the series "doesn’t get too much into the weeds of whether the action of the FBI Hostage Rescue Team... was too aggressive or even warranted. What it does bring out is just how entrenched both sides of the siege are in their positions, even 30 years later.... you can see each side is dug in, and by sticking to the siege itself, Tiller gives the viewer a lot of room to judge for themselves. Were the Branch Davidians peace-loving churchgoers? Nope. Did the feds take things too far? Probably. You may come to different conclusions, and that’s exactly what Tiller wants viewers to do."

Sean O'Neal of Texas Monthly wrote that the series revisits the events "without any agenda—or real purpose", and that "for everyone who has even a passing familiarity with what really happened, however, Waco: American Apocalypse is likely to feel redundant and ruminative, replaying the tapes and reopening old wounds to no apparent end. Without anything new to say, the best that it can offer is a mournful shake of the head."

== See also ==
- Waco, the Big Lie, 1993 documentary
- Waco: The Rules of Engagement, 1997 documentary
- Waco, 2018 miniseries
