= Bearden (surname) =

Bearden is a surname. Notable people with the surname include:

- Gene Bearden (1920–2004), American baseball player
- Milton Bearden (born 1940s), American intelligence officer, author, and film consultant
- Romare Bearden (1911–1988), African-American artist
