= Bearden, Oklahoma =

- Town
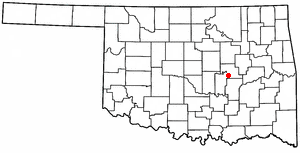
- Location of Bearden, Oklahoma
- Coordinates: 35°21′25″N 96°23′06″W
- Country: United States
- State: Oklahoma
- County: Okfuskee

Area
  - Total: 7.65 sq mi (19.82 km^{2})
  - Land: 7.54 sq mi (19.54 km^{2})
  - Water: 0.11 sq mi (0.28 km^{2})
- Elevation: 860 ft (260 m)

Population (2020)
  - Total: 135
  - Density: 17.9/sq mi (6.91/km^{2})
- Time zone: UTC-6 (Central (CST))
  - Summer (DST): UTC-5 (CDT)
- ZIP code: 74859
- Area codes: 539/918
- FIPS code: 40-04700
- GNIS feature ID: 2411672

Bearden is a town in Okfuskee County, Oklahoma, United States. The locale is old enough to appear on a 1911 Rand McNally map of the county. The population was 135 at the 2020 Census.

it is the birthplace of Benjamin Roden, a religious leader & founder of the Branch Davidians

== Geography ==
According to the United States Census Bureau, the town has a total area of 7.6 square miles (20 km^{2}), all land.

== Demographics ==
Historical population
Census	Pop.	Note	%±
1990	142		—
2000	140		−1.4%
2010	133		−5.0%
2020	135		1.5%
U.S. Decennial Census

=== 2020 census ===
As of the 2020 census, Bearden had a population of 135. The median age was 36.7 years. 24.4% of residents were under the age of 18 and 19.3% of residents were 65 years of age or older. For every 100 females there were 92.9 males, and for every 100 females age 18 and over there were 104.0 males age 18 and over.

0.0% of residents lived in urban areas, while 100.0% lived in rural areas.

There were 47 households in Bearden, of which 55.3% had children under the age of 18 living in them. Of all households, 76.6% were married-couple households, 8.5% were households with a male householder and no spouse or partner present, and 8.5% were households with a female householder and no spouse or partner present. About 4.2% of all households were made up of individuals and 4.2% had someone living alone who was 65 years of age or older.

There were 51 housing units, of which 7.8% were vacant. The homeowner vacancy rate was 0.0% and the rental vacancy rate was 0.0%.

Racial composition as of the 2020 census
Race	Number	Percent
White	91	67.4%
Black or African American	0	0.0%
American Indian and Alaska Native	23	17.0%
Asian	0	0.0%
Native Hawaiian and Other Pacific Islander	0	0.0%
Some other race	1	0.7%
Two or more races	20	14.8%
Hispanic or Latino (of any race)	4	3.0%

=== 2000 census ===
As of the census of 2000, there were 140 people, 49 households, and 36 families residing in the town. The population density was 18.5 people per square mile (7.2/km^{2}). There were 66 housing units at an average density of 8.7 per square mile (3.4/km^{2}). The racial makeup of the town was 87.86% White, 7.86% African American, 2.14% Native American, 0.71% from other races, and 1.43% from two or more races. Hispanic or Latino of any race were 0.71% of the population.

There were 49 households, out of which 40.8% had children under the age of 18 living with them, 69.4% were married couples living together, 2.0% had a female householder with no husband present, and 24.5% were non-families. 18.4% of all households were made up of individuals, and 8.2% had someone living alone who was 65 years of age or older. The average household size was 2.86 and the average family size was 3.35.

In the town, the population was spread out, with 31.4% under the age of 18, 5.7% from 18 to 24, 30.0% from 25 to 44, 22.1% from 45 to 64, and 10.7% who were 65 years of age or older. The median age was 36 years. For every 100 females, there were 102.9 males. For every 100 females age 18 and over, there were 118.2 males.

The median income for a household in the town was $20,417, and the median income for a family was $21,875. Males had a median income of $21,429 versus $11,667 for females. The per capita income for the town was $11,359. There were 24.3% of families and 29.8% of the population living below the poverty line, including 46.7% of under eighteens and 13.6% of those over 64.
