= Shepherd's Rod =

American movement within the worldwide Seventh-day Adventist Church

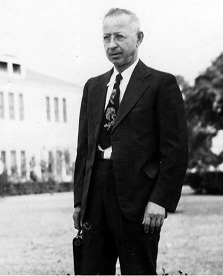
Victor T. Houteff, c. 1950

The Shepherd's Rod or Davidian Seventh-day Adventists movement was founded in 1929 by Victor Houteff. He joined the Seventh-day Adventist Church in 1919 and was later excommunicated from the church in 1930 for promoting "heretical" doctrines that he claimed were new revelations from God to further Adventist theology.

The official organizational name was adopted in 1942 as The Davidian Seventh-day Adventists but its message was still referred to as "The Shepherd’s Rod" by both members and critics. The name is a reference to Victor Houteff's initial and most important publication, The Shepherd's Rod. It finds its origin in the Bible, namely, the book of Micah 6:9; 7:14. It reached its peak in the early 1950s with thousands of adherents before splintering into various factions after Victor Houteff's death in 1955. There are various groups claiming Victor Houteff's theology today. They claim a number of unique doctrines that are said to be for the Seventh-day Adventist denomination.

== History ==
=== Victor Houteff's early days ===
The Shepherd's Rod manuscript traces its roots to Victor Houteff, a Seventh-day Adventist Church sabbath school teacher in good standing in a southern California congregation. In 1929, Victor Houteff came in conflict with church authorities over differing interpretations of chapters 54–66 of the Book of Isaiah. He believed that the Seventh-day Adventist Church was God’s remnant church but needed to be revived and reformed. Victor Houteff shared these new revelations in his Sabbath School class and they were well received by church members. A number of church elders determined that his interpretations were not compatible with Adventist theology. He was then asked to discontinue his teachings. Shortly thereafter, Victor Houteff had an informal meeting with some local and regional church administrators to share his views. These leaders dismissed his interpretations of scripture as "fanciful.” Victor Houteff was viewed by his followers as an inspired messenger of God that was sent to the Seventh-day Adventist church and was regarded as having the gift of prophecy.

=== Publication of The Shepherd's Rod ===
By the summer of 1930, Houteff compiled his ideas in a 172-page manuscript entitled The Shepherd's Rod. He called for a worldwide denominational reform and allegedly brought "new thought" to Seventh-day Adventists eschatology.

Houteff listed 12 specific areas that he felt the church needed to address under the heading "Partial List of Abominations". According to Houteff, the book's chief purpose was "a call for reformation". It also included information attempting to define the identity of the 144,000 of the Book of Revelation, as well as his disputed interpretations of Isaiah 54–66.

Houteff personally handed 33 copies of his manuscript to church leaders at the General Conference held from May 29 to June 12, 1930, in San Francisco, California. According to Houteff, each recipient promised to read the manuscript thoroughly and respond to him either in person or by letter. In the subsequent six years only two recipients responded. The official church explanation was that the recipients were preoccupied with the tasks of the Session and did not have sufficient time to review the manuscript.

One of the recipients, F. C. Gilbert, a field secretary for the General Conference of Seventh-day Adventists and respected author of Adventist theology books, responded by letter approximately two weeks later. Gilbert advised Houteff to give up his ideas. To Houteff's disappointment, he did not address his twelve points or views on the "144,000". Instead, Gilbert challenged Houteff's application of certain symbols, questioned his method of analysis and rejected his manuscript as unsound. Gilbert also sent copies of his findings to church leaders in the Los Angeles area. Church leaders were satisfied that Houteff's interpretations had been refuted.

Houteff, however, remained sure of his teachings. He completed his book by adding 83 pages and had 5,000 copies of The Shepherd's Rod printed in November 1930, which he then distributed to various Adventist ministers, workers, and laymen.

=== The spread of controversy ===
Despite being disfellowshipped in 1930, Houteff remained opposed to establishing a new movement. He told his followers: "in case some one's name is taken off the church books for carrying on the message, do not be discouraged in any way but press onward as though nothing happened. Pay your honest tithe and offering to your church and feel like IT IS your Father's house." Collections of study groups began to form in various Adventist churches across the country for the purpose of reviewing Houteff's new doctrines. Those who accepted his conclusions and promoted his material were also disfellowshipped.

In 1932, Houteff published The Shepherd's Rod, Volume 2, a 304-page book. Two additional booklets followed in 1933 comprising the beginning of a series of tracts that would be later referred to as Volume Three. Allegations began to surface that believers of Houteff's teachings were being physically removed from worship services simply due to their study of Houteff's materials. Reports also spread that Houteff himself was brutally assaulted upon attempting to enter a Seventh-day Adventist Church in Los Angeles, California.

Finding no other recourse after the Seventh-day Adventist Church rebuffed Houteff's claims and demands for reformation, Rod believers organized the Universal Publishing Association (UPA) in 1934 in Los Angeles, California. The purpose of the UPA was the publishing of the Rod's message, which Rod adherents believe is the Lord's fulfillment of Micah 6:9 and 7:14.

In December 1933, Carolina Conference President E. T. Wilson publicly embraced Houteff's views and began promoting them, becoming the Shepherd's Rod Vice-President on organization in 1934.

=== 1934 hearing ===
On January 18, 1934 a formal hearing was granted when the Tabernacle Seventh-day Adventist Church of Fullerton, California sent a request to regional administrators requesting an official hearing to examine Houteff's teachings. The agreement stipulated that twelve ministers were to assemble as a panel to hear Houteff's views. Houteff was to present five studies to the panel in one week. After each study, the panel was to review his study, determine its veracity and reconvene the meeting. If an error was found in the study, the meeting was to be discontinued.

The hearing took place on Monday, February 19, 1934, in Los Angeles, California. According to Houteff, he only learned of the details of the hearing on the previous Thursday. Twelve experienced ministers were chosen to hear Houteff's views and decide if those views were consistent with the Church's understanding of prophecy. The twelve ministers were: A. G. Daniells, Field Secretary; Glenn A. Calkins, President of the Pacific Union Conference; G. A. Roberts, President of the Southern California Conference; C. S. Prout, President of the Southeastern California-Arizona Conference; W. G. Wirth, Bible Teacher at the College of Medical Evangelists; H. M. S. Richards, Evangelist; C. M. Sorenson, Bible Teacher at Southern California Junior College; J. A. Burden, Manager of Paradise Valley Sanitarium; J. C. Stevens, Pastor of the Seventh-day Adventist Church in Glendale, California; W. M. Adams, Religious Liberty Secretary of the Pacific Union Conference; J. E. Fulton, President of the Northern California Conference; and F. C. Gilbert, Field Secretary of the General Conference. Unknown to Houteff, the highest ecclesiastical body of the church met that same day in Washington, D.C., declared his teaching to be heresy and appointed a committee to prepare a document refuting his arguments for general circulation.

In Los Angeles, the meeting began with prayer and a verbatim reading of the agreement that had brought the panel together. It was expressed by the Chairman, A. G. Daniells, that the meeting would be conducted "in strict harmony with the terms of the agreement set forth in the written request." Houteff presented his first study on the topic of "The Harvest". Despite the Chairman's statement and the terms of the agreement, the Panel requested that Houteff continue with the remainder of his studies after the conclusion of his first study, so the Panel could get the "full picture". When Houteff declined in harmony with the terms of the agreement, the meeting was abruptly adjourned. The Committee presented its findings in writing four weeks later on March 18, 1934, unanimously declaring that his teachings were false. After feeling that he was treated unjustly at his hearing, Houteff started to form an association for the purpose of promoting revival and reformation among Seventh-day Adventists. Despite taking this step, Houteff continued to advocate that adherents continue to maintain membership within the Seventh-day Adventist Church.

The events of the first few years of the Davidian movement provide, to a degree, some insight into the reasons that the controversy continues in the Seventh-day Adventist Church today. Seventh-day Adventist Church leaders felt that Houteff was incorrigible and headstrong, listening to no voice but his own and persisted in teaching his ideas until the Church was forced to disfellowship him. Davidians respond that Houteff's teachings were not officially declared heresy at the time he was disfellowshipped or for several years thereafter, and there were no other grounds upon which to do so. Seventh-day Adventist Church leaders also contend that the panel of twelve ministers heard Houteff's views even after he was disfellowshipped and found the views to be unsound. Davidians assert that Houteff's hearing was unfair because it reportedly violated the Fullerton Agreement and his teachings had already been judged. Davidians point out that, in their view, the leadership were underhanded in convening a meeting in Washington, D.C. behind Houteff's back before the Committee's decision was made. There is also contention about whether Houteff voluntarily forfeited his membership or not. However, official Seventh-day Adventist Church history states that he was disfellowshipped and did not voluntarily forfeit his membership.

In 1934–1936 the Seventh-day Adventist Church declared the Shepherd's Rod message to be heresy. Today, it continues to identify the Davidian movement as a "disloyal, divisive movement". Any member choosing to identify with either the Davidian message or its originator incurs Church discipline, up to and including being disfellowshipped.

=== Official organization ===
On March 12, 1934, the Shepherd's Rod was officially organized. Houteff argued that this was done because the Fullerton Agreement stipulated that the Seventh-day Adventist Conference Committee should have responded to his first study in approximately 24 hours and several weeks had passed with no communication from the Committee after abruptly adjourning the meeting. The Seventh-day Adventist Church responded that he was informed at the close of the first study that the Committee would need time to study and compare notes.

On July 15, 1934, the organization's first newsletter, The Symbolic Code, was published. In the August 15, 1934 issue, Houteff wrote,

Being deprived of all denominational advantages such as sanitariums, health food factories, printing presses, etc., perhaps it may be necessary for a rural location for the establishment of a combined unit to assist in carrying the message to the church until the "siege against it" shall be successfully culminated in a glorious victory when "the zeal of the Lord of hosts will perform this." (Isa. 9:7.) This has been suggested by a sister and her husband who have had considerable experience in this line. Therefore we call the attention of all who are standing in the light to give consideration to such an enterprise. Anyone having knowledge of such a location and the necessary information regarding it, please communicate it to this office. Our prayers for such an undertaking on behalf of God's people will be answered by whatever the results to this call might be.

In 1937, the organization took a more definite form naming nine persons to form an Executive Council, listing field secretaries and other officers and composing a constitution and by-laws under the name "The General Association of Shepherd's Rod Seventh-day Adventists.

In 1942, the organization name was officially changed to "Davidian Seventh-day Adventists" and three organizational tracts were issued in early 1943 identifying additional components of the existing organization. The organization became known as The General Association of Davidian Seventh-day Adventists. It was also called The Davidian Seventh-day Adventist Association in one of its organizational tracts.

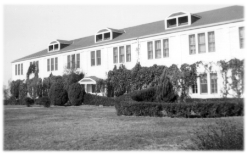
This was the largest building within the Davidian grounds in Waco, Texas, known as the administration building (c. 1950s).

=== Mount Carmel Center ===
Soon after organizing in 1934, Shepherd's Rod leaders began to desire a larger, more centrally located place to establish headquarters. In April 1935, 189 acres were purchased just outside Waco, Texas, and the headquarters' office was relocated to that property in September 1935. Envisioning the work that they desired to be accomplished from there, the new home for their work was named "Mount Carmel Center" after the place where Elijah called the Israelites back to worshiping God. Up to 125 people resided at the Center. In 1937 an additional 186 acres were added.

One of Houteff's primary complaints was that the mainstream Seventh-day Adventist Church's institutions were compromising their message and mission by seeking approval and accreditation of the applicable medical and educational boards. Ironically, some of Houteff's critics issued similar complaints. The Davidian organization established institutions of its own, claiming to strictly follow the guidelines of the Adventist church founders. Over the next twenty years a children's school, sanitarium, rest home, vocational and home economics school, and other improvements were established on the property. There was also an extensive farming operation with an orchard of approximately 900 trees, dairy cows and a large vegetable garden. The flagship structure was the multi-level administration building, which housed the main office, additional staff offices, chapel, printing equipment and Houteff's sleeping quarters. This building is currently in the possession of Vanguard College Preparatory School.

=== Peak years ===
Through Houteff's evangelistic endeavors, several thousand Adventists accepted the doctrine of The Shepherd's Rod. It is believed that Benjamin Roden accepted these teachings in 1946, and together with his wife, Lois, tried to share the message with others within the Seventh-day Adventist Church.

The height of Davidian strength and activity occurred in the early 1950s. By the mid-1950s, its regular subscribers, students, and devotees may have numbered close to 100,000 worldwide. Believing that the predicted events in Houteff's writings may have been on the verge of fulfillment and seizing on apparent momentum from a failed prediction that the church made regarding the return of the Jews to Israel the movement launched a "hunting campaign" in 1953. This was a door-to-door effort to reach Adventists with the Davidian publications. To help accomplish this, the Association began to sell Mount Carmel Center property and purchased half a dozen new automobiles. An additional factor fueling the sale of Mount Carmel's property was its encroachment onto Waco's city limits. The anticipation was that the encroachment of the city limits upon the property would coalesce with the completion of the door-to-door effort. It was believed that this would have led to witnessing the fulfillment of Houteff's predictions and going to "the Kingdom".

=== The Shepherd's Rod fractures ===
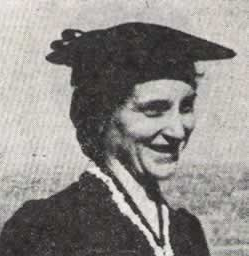
Florence Houteff

Victor Houteff unexpectedly died at age 69 on February 5, 1955, in the midst of the hunting campaign. His death caused an immediate power struggle and fracturing of the Shepherd's Rod organization into several factions.

Victor's widow Florence Houteff, the Association's Secretary, immediately sought to eject E. T. Wilson, who had personally been appointed Vice-President of the Association by Houteff during the 1934 organization process, and would have become acting President by default. Florence Houteff convened an Executive Council meeting the day after her husband's death, with Wilson missing because of illness. In Wilson's absence, Houteff successfully convinced the Executive Council to appoint her Vice-President and remove Wilson. Her argument rested on the assertion that these actions "were in harmony with recommendations made by Brother Houteff prior to his death". This request seemed so unusual that, in a meeting the next day, an Executive Council member challenged her to provide evidence for her claim. Despite acknowledging that she could not provide any proof, the Executive Council yielded and continued to uphold her request. Once established as Vice-President, Mrs. Houteff announced that she had some procedural changes in mind, and increased the veto power of the Vice-President.

Several months after Victor Houteff's death, Shepherd's Rod member Benjamin Roden began to claim that he had received new revelations from God and that he should be recognized as the new leader of the Shepherd's Rod. Mrs. Houteff and the Executive Council rebuffed Roden's claims.

Florence Houteff published a prediction that the forty-two month period told of in Revelation 11:3–6 would begin in November 1955 and terminate on April 22, 1959. This prediction has been allegedly attributed to Victor Houteff, but no statement from his writings has ever been produced supporting this interpretation. Roden opposed Houteff's prediction and founded the Branch Davidian organization several months later. The Branch Davidians differed from the original Davidians in several areas, such as the requirement that the Feast days must be kept and that the Holy Spirit is a female being. The name is an allusion to the anointed "Branch" mentioned in Zechariah 3:8; 6:12.

On April 9, 1959, a group of Branch Davidians sent a protest letter to the General Conference of Seventh-day Adventists clarifying their opposition to Mrs. Houteff's predictions and their rationale for doing so.

Florence Houteff and the Executive Council published an open challenge to the Seventh-day Adventist Church leadership shortly before the termination of the 42 months on April 22, 1959. Mrs. Houteff's challenge stated that the fulfillment of her prediction would determine whether her late husband's message was true or not.

April 22, 1959, passed without the predicted events materializing. Confusion and embarrassment set in and the Davidian movement continued to fracture. Many adherents left.

In 1962, another group of Davidians sent a protest letter to Seventh-day Adventist Church leadership, rejecting Houteff's 42-month prediction. This group went to California to reorganize and continue the distribution of Houteff's original literature. These individuals became the forerunners of the Davidian Seventh-day Adventist Association of today.

Florence Houteff announced her intention to disband the Davidian organization, with the assets to be sold off and the proceeds disbursed among her Executive Council. This arrangement was opposed by many members. She and the Executive Council members that remained loyal to her resigned on March 1, 1962, took five thousand dollars in cash with them, and left the remaining assets in the hands of a lawyer for distribution.

Most of the Mount Carmel Center property ended up in the hands of the EE Ranch, but the Branch Davidians retained a core 77 acres (310,000 m^{2}) around the administrative building.

One offshoot of the Shepherd's Rod known as the Branch Davidians was involved in a siege at the Mount Carmel Center in 1993, in which both law enforcement agents and Branch Davidians were killed. This event received significant sustained media attention.

== Publications ==
The writings of Victor Houteff are referred to as The Shepherd's Rod (or The Rod). The appellation "Rod" is derived from Micah 6:9; 7:14:

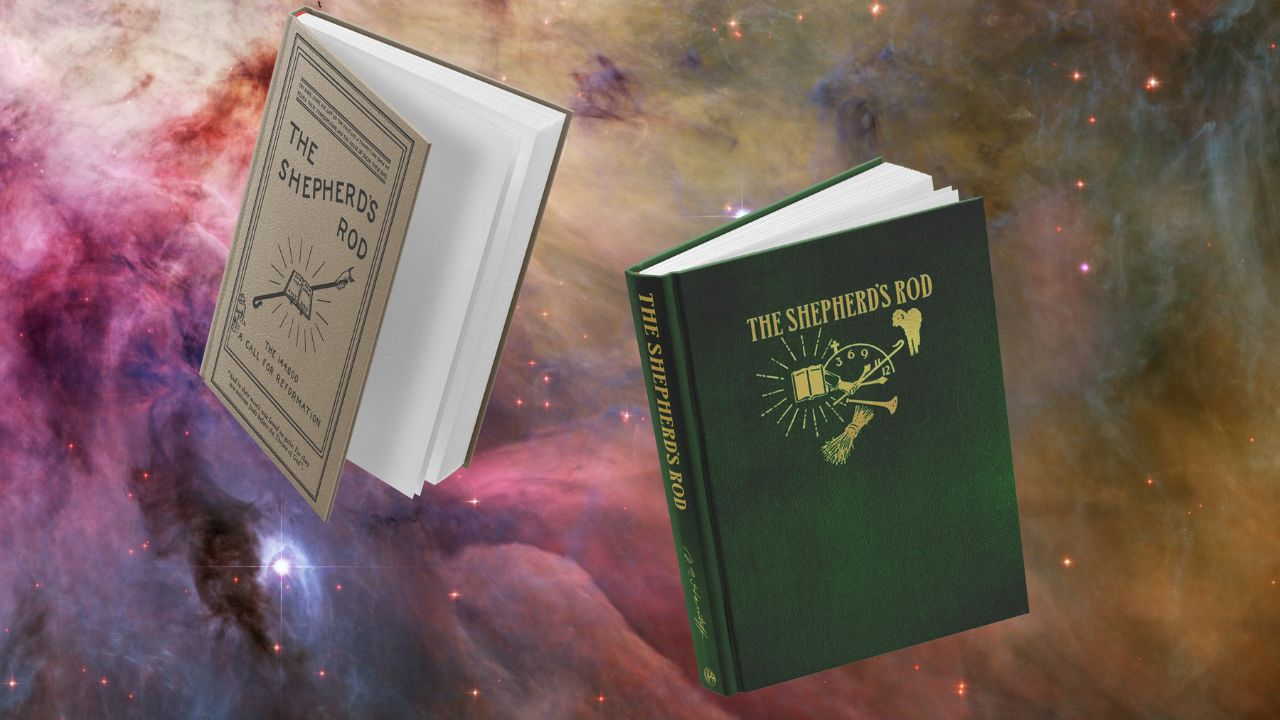
The Shepherd's Rod, Vols. 1 and 2

"The Lord's voice crieth unto the city and the man of wisdom shall see thy name: Hear ye the rod, and who hath appointed it." Micah 6:9

"Feed thy people with thy rod, the flock of thine heritage, which dwell solitarily in the wood, in the midst of Carmel: let them feed in Bashan and Gilead, as in the days of old." Micah 7:14

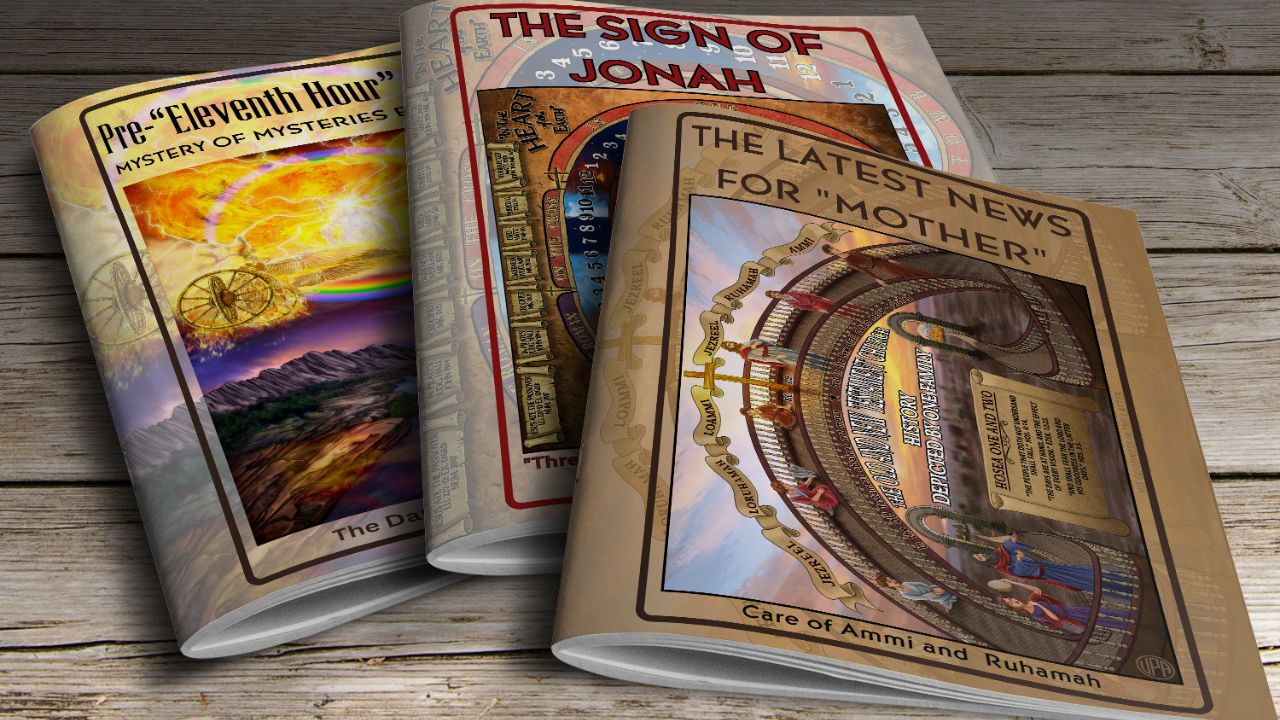
Misc. Tract Covers of The Shepherd's Rod Literature

=== List of publications ===
- The Shepherd’s Rod (Manuscript)
- The Shepherd’s Rod, Vols. 1 & 2
- The Shepherd’s Rod, Vol. 3 (Tracts 1–15)
- Misc. Tracts (10)
- Timely Greetings, Vols. 1 & 2
- The Symbolic Codes, Vols. 1–10.2
- Jezreel Letters 1-9
- The Answerer, Books 1-5
- 1944 Eschatological Charts (Illustrations) 1–18

== Mission ==
Provisional in set-up as well as in name, the Davidian Seventh-day Adventist Association exists solely to accomplish a divinely appointed work within the Seventh-day Adventist denomination, wherein it therefore strictly confines its activities. As its work there within draws to a close, and the "servants of our God" (Rev. 7:3) are sealed, its name will be changed (Isa. 56:5; 62:2; 65:15) and its purpose and its work will become all-embracing to the gospel (Matt. 17:11; Acts 3:21, Isa. 61:4-7). This Association shall be known provisionally as The Davidian Seventh-day Adventists, the prophetic off-spring of the parent Seventh-day Adventist, the Laodicean, church.

== Main doctrines ==
Davidians share the same fundamental beliefs as their Adventist counterparts and that their divergence of views begins with the interpretation of some prophetic subjects. Due to differing interpretations of prophetic subjects from mainstream Seventh-day Adventistism, Davidians have met with opposition from church leaders. Inasmuch as many of them have been disfellowshipped, they still maintain that the Seventh-Day Adventist Church is the remnant church of God of the last days.

The major themes of The Rod message published by Victor Houteff are listed below with brief explanations:

- A Call for Reformation: Davidians believe that the Seventh-day Adventist Church has become lax in its standards, practices, and devotion to God and that the Church's institutions have changed from the original founder's pattern of operation and purpose.
- The 144,000: Revelation Chapter 7: The fundamental purpose of the Shepherd's Rod message is to identify the corporate identity of the 144,000 of Revelation 7. This topic has been a much-discussed subject in Adventism for many years. Houteff believed that he received revelations that unlocked the mystery. First, he asserted that Davidians were the same company as the "marked ones" found in Ezekiel 9 (see the next section). Next, Houteff described Davidians as Christian Jews that had lost their racial identity over the centuries. Finally, he described Davidians as those who would preach to all nations and gather an innumerable company of people who would accept Davidians' teachings. Regarding this final point, Houteff stated that the Seventh-day Adventist Church had taught nearly identical views just three years prior to the publication of his first book, The Shepherd's Rod, and Houteff felt that it should not have been a point of contention.
- Ezekiel 9: Though it is largely attributed to his views, Houteff was not the first writer connected with Adventism to use Ezekiel 9 with Revelation 7. Seventh-day Adventist pioneer James White was the first to make the link in the Seventh-day Adventist Church's first publication. His wife, church prophetess Ellen G. White, made the connection later in more detail. Houteff relied heavily on the link from James White, but is unique in describing the event in detail as the beginning of the "investigative judgment for the living" (see the next section). Houteff is also unique in describing it as the final purification of the church and placing its fulfillment just prior to the gathering of the innumerable company. Houteff maintained that the "slaying" mentioned in the text was a literal, future event performed by angels. A statement published by the Ellen G. White Estate twenty-five years after Houteff's death appears to substantiate this assertion. He is also sometimes credited with teaching that Davidians will perform the slaying depicted; however, Houteff's writings do not reflect such teachings and contain a direct denial of this claim, dismissing such notion as "absurd".
- The Investigative Judgment for the Living: The concept of the "investigative judgment" is almost exclusive to Seventh-day Adventists. The coming of Christ is believed to be imminent. Just prior to the Second Coming of Christ, a judgment is to take place in heaven that constitutes a review of the records to see who will be saved and lost (see Dan. 7:9, 10). In common with Seventh-day Adventists, Davidians believe that this judgment began in 1844 with the dead. Houteff explained that the judgment for the living was not only an investigation of the records in Heaven but also an investigation of the people on earth; first in the church, then in the world. He never set a date for when this would occur, but he did assert that it would begin in the Adventist church and was depicted in Ezekiel 9 and Matthew 13:30. According to Houteff, the 144,000 would be those who survived the judgment in the church.
- The Pre-Millennial Kingdom: This concept represents Davidians' widest departure from Seventh-day Adventist theology. The Middle East has a significant role in the Davidians' understanding of end-time events. In modern Seventh-day Adventist eschatology, it has little to none. Davidians believe that a kingdom will be set up in Israel just prior to Christ's return based primarily upon numerous Old Testament prophecies (such as Hosea 3: 4, 5; Mic. 4, Eze. 36, 37; Jer. 30, 31; Isa. 11). It is believed that it will be a kingdom of peace where none, human or animal, will harm another. Houteff claimed that every prophet in the Old Testament scriptures predicted this kingdom, and went on to explain how the current State of Israel did not fulfill those prophecies. Mainstream Seventh-day Adventists view these prophecies as conditional based on ancient Israel's obedience; some may never be fulfilled and some may be fulfilled in principle but not necessarily in every detail. In addition to symbolic prophecy, the Shepherd's Rod message contains counsel regarding healthful living, a successful marriage and family life, education, prayer, and other practical topics.

== Organizational structure ==
The governing document for Davidian Seventh-day Adventists is entitled The Leviticus of the Davidian Seventh-day Adventists. It is referred to as one of "three organizational tracts... of 102 pages" and the "literature of reformation".. This tract contains the constitution and by-laws as well as the Davidian Seventh-day Adventist Association's purpose and pattern. While it claims to constitute the literature of "reformation" it acknowledges that its constitution and by-laws will not be fully operational until the proposed "kingdom of peace" is established. The Executive Council constitutes the governing body. Ideally, it consists of seven members: four officers and three non-officers. The Executive Council has full administrative and executive authority between sessions of the Association. When the Davidian Seventh-day Adventist Association is in Session, the Executive Council yields its authority to the Session. The regular officers of the council are President, Vice-President, Treasurer, and Secretary. The scriptural examples referred to in the constitution outline that the President is chosen directly by God through a direct, face-to-face encounter. This process is without any other human involvement. The President has the dual role as prophet and chief administrator of the Association.

The scriptural examples connected with all of the other officers outline three methods of appointment: direct appointment by the President, indirect appointment by the President and direct appointment by the body of believers. In the absence of someone to fill the position of President, some Davidian groups have a Vice-President as their chief administrator. The vice-president assumes the administrative role and the prophetic role (by other Davidic Group). This position is taken based on the understanding that no additional inspired interpreters (prophets) are due to the church until after the establishment of the kingdom.

Davidian ministers may be either licensed or ordained. Ordained ministers are qualified to officially teach and represent the Davidian movement as well as perform ceremonies such as baptisms, funerals and weddings. Licensed ministers may teach and represent the movement, but may not perform scriptural ceremonies unless specially authorized by the Executive Council. Since there is no desire to establish separate houses of worship, the ministers do not function in the traditional sense but have the capacity to do so if and when the need arises. The ceremonies are usually performed for believers to the Davidian message when mainstream Seventh-day Adventist ministers refuse to do so.

Field Secretaries are credentialed ministers or Bible workers who are responsible for a particular geographic area within a designated territory. They may make contact with interested parties, answer inquiries and direct individuals to workers within their territory.

Bible workers are individuals who have demonstrated competency with teaching the Davidian message. They may engage in this activity on a full-time or part-time basis. Under most circumstances, those who became credentialed Bible workers and ministers graduated from the training school: the Davidic-Levitical Institute (D.L.I.). These training schools are held at various times in various locations domestically and internationally.

Members generally fall into two classifications: accredited and non-accredited. The accredited member is one who has applied for and been granted a Certificate of Fellowship. A non-accredited member is someone who has not been granted a Certificate of Fellowship but supports the movement through various means and believes in its publications.

== Writings ==
Victor Houteff continued to publish additional volumes of his prophetic writings until his death in 1955. These publications contain, but are not limited to, no fewer than 15 numbered tracts, five volumes of "The Answerer" (questions submitted to his office from believers and non-believers of his message), two volumes of "Timely Greetings", (Volume 1 containing 52 books and Volume 2 containing 46 books), and a series of monthly publications entitled "The Symbolic Code" containing many of Houteff's Sabbath sermons. These sermons were given after believers in both "the Spirit of Prophecy" (Ellen G. White), and Davidian messages were disfellowshipped and chose to have private worship rather than begin a new church denomination. These publications included questions and answers, recipes for healthful living, spiritual encouragement and admonition, letters from the field of their work in the Seventh-day Adventist Church, and many other practical Christian-living topics. He also published miscellaneous publications and public letters to the leadership of the Seventh-day Adventist Church (nine "Jezreel Letters"). All of these publications were distributed and mailed free of charge to many thousands of recipients throughout the world. (See "1950 General Conference Special" p. 34–35, p. 44.)

=== Criticism of the Seventh-day Adventist Church ===
Houteff's teachings include a message intended directly to the members of the Seventh-day Adventist Church. Viewing the Adventist Church as backsliding from the beliefs upon which it had been founded a hundred years before, Houteff saw his message as a method of solving the many doctrinal disagreements which had arisen as the Church expanded in the 1900s after the death of Ellen G. White.

Davidian representatives were implicated by certain Seventh-day Adventist Church leaders in setting a fire that resulted in four deaths in San Francisco, California, at the time of the General Conference Session in 1936. The Davidians suspected were detained, questioned and were cleared and released within thirty minutes.

While the Seventh-day Adventist Church has a uniform policy regarding views of the Davidian message and movement, there is not a church-wide policy regarding church attendance. Consequently, local and regional perceptions of Davidians are varied. In some localities, Davidians experience tepid tolerance to mild acceptance. Attitudes toward them range from being a mild annoyance to a serious threat to the stability and mission of the church. This has led to some far-reaching policies and recommendations regarding how to deal with them. At the very least, church members are instructed not to study with Davidians. According to Dr. William Pitts, Professor of Religion at Baylor University and noted Davidian expert, "Adventists have told me of their counselors who collected Davidian tracts from campers as soon as they were distributed and deposited them in trash cans." Some Adventist leaders have published that Davidians were so apostate that they should be denied participation in communion services held by the church even though the church traditionally allows non-members to participate. Published testimonies by adherents at the time suggest that those instructions were carried out.

In a 2012 memo to its area pastors, the Georgia-Cumberland Conference of the Seventh-day Adventist Church referred to adherents of the Davidian message as "hardcore aggressors against the church" and compared them to "cancer cells". The memo also includes a form letter that is to be given to any individual identified with the Davidian movement requesting that they cease and desist from coming onto church property immediately. It further states that if the individual decides to recant The Rod message, he or she will not receive help from the local congregation, but must communicate with local conference officials. There is evidence that this policy has been implemented. In countering and dispelling these allegations, Davidians generally point to historical incidents in which their adherents were treated with unprovoked physical and psychological abuse, from the Seventh-day Adventist Church leadership or church personnel. As a result, Davidians advocate that The Rod message strictly teaches to be non-disruptive and peaceful.

== In popular culture ==
Eight of Victor Houteff's prophetic charts were featured in an art exhibit entitled "At the Eleventh Hour" at Cabinet in Brooklyn, New York, in 2009.
