= George Roden =

American leader of the Branch Davidians

- Born: George Buchanan Roden; January 17, 1938; Gregg, Texas, U.S.
- Died: December 8, 1998 (aged 60); Big Spring, Texas, U.S.
- Occupations: Former leader of the Branch Davidians, Sabbath teacher
- Known for: 1984 Mount Carmel declared Rodenville; "The Branch" leadership 1986–1987; November 3, 1987, fusillade with Vernon Howell aka David Koresh
- Criminal charge: Homicide
- Criminal penalty: Not guilty by reason of insanity
- Criminal status: Deceased
- Spouse: Amo Bishop
- Children: at least 1 (son)
- Parents: Benjamin Roden (father); Lois Roden (mother)

George Buchanan Roden (January 17, 1938 – December 8, 1998) was an American leader of the Branch Davidian sect, a Seventh-day Adventist splinter group. In 1987, he was evicted from the Mount Carmel Center near Waco, Texas, by his rival David Koresh. He was later confined in a Texas mental hospital for a 1989 murder until his own death in 1998.

== Branch Davidians ==
George Roden was the presumed successor to his mother Lois Roden, who had become president of the Branch Davidians in 1978, when her husband and group leader Benjamin Roden had died. However, Vernon Howell (after 1990, known as David Koresh) arrived at Mount Carmel and began a sexual relationship with Lois Roden, who was then in her 60s. Koresh justified their relationship by claiming that God had chosen him to father a child with her, who would be the Chosen One. George Roden felt that his position of leadership was threatened and was deeply offended by Koresh's relationship with his mother. He filed a lawsuit in federal court alleging that Koresh had raped Lois and brainwashed her into turning against him.

In 1984 or 1985, a fire destroyed a $500,000 administration building and press at Mount Carmel. Roden said Koresh started the fire, but Koresh replied that "no man set that fire" and that it was a judgment of God. Roden, claiming to have the support of the majority of the cult, forced Koresh and his group off the property at gunpoint. Disturbed by the events, a further splinter group led by Charles Joseph Pace moved out of Mount Carmel Center and set up home in Gadsden, Alabama.

Koresh and about 25 followers settled in Palestine, Texas; Roden renamed Mount Carmel "Rodenville". In a videotaped interview, Roden led a tour of "Rodenville" using an M1 carbine as a pointer and declared: "It's basically a holy jihad, Khomeini versus Israel, that's what Vernon Howell has with me."

In October 1987, Roden married Amo Paul Bishop (known as Amo P. Bishop Roden since then). A month later, on November 3, 1987, Koresh and seven of his followers stormed Mount Carmel.

According to one version, Roden, resentful of Koresh's power over the Davidians, had challenged Koresh, saying that whoever could resurrect the dead was the true leader. Roden told the press he had exhumed a body only because he had been moving the community cemetery. While Roden prayed over the body of Ana Hughes, who had died two decades earlier, Koresh reported Roden to the McLennan County sheriff's office for corpse abuse. The police told Koresh that he needed evidence to back up his accusation.

On November 3, 1987, Koresh and seven followers returned to Mount Carmel heavily armed and wearing camouflage clothing. They stealthily entered the compound, allegedly to obtain a photograph. However, they did not bring a camera, but carried weapons and a map of the grounds with positions to occupy. They found Roden crouched behind a tree with an Uzi submachine gun, and a gun battle ensued for several minutes. Roden fled the property with wounds to his hand and chest. Koresh's companions were found not guilty after a two-week trial for attempted murder in Waco, and a mistrial was declared in Koresh's case. Their weapons, five .223-caliber semiautomatic rifles, two .22-caliber rifles, and two 12-gauge shotguns, which had been confiscated by the police, were returned, as well. The shootout at Mount Carmel was described by The New York Times as a foretelling of the violence of the Waco siege.

Koresh and his group started paying the back taxes for the property and treating it as their own.

In March 1988, Roden was put in jail for a total of nine months under contempt of court charges, first because of his use of foul language in court pleadings, and then for living on the property after being ordered to neither live on the property nor call himself the leader of the religious group in a 1979 case. The next day, Koresh's followers moved from their headquarters in Palestine, Texas, to Mount Carmel.

== Adair murder ==
In October 1989, Roden killed Wayman Dale Adair (age 56) in Odessa, Texas by shooting him; Adair was also struck on the head with a hatchet. Roden and Adair were sharing a house in Odessa (previously owned by Roden's parents) that was converted into two "efficiency apartments". However, Marc Breault (former follower of Koresh and author of Inside the Cult) describes Adair as just a person who came to Roden's home to share a divine revelation that he, Adair, was a messiah. According to a newspaper report from 1993, Roden said that in the 1989 shooting, he was defending himself from a hitman sent by the cult.

Put on trial for murder, Roden was found not guilty by reason of insanity, confined to a mental hospital, and later moved to another mental hospital in Big Spring, Texas.

== Mental illness, escape, and death ==
On September 30, 1993, Roden walked away from the Big Spring State Hospital and went missing for four days after Steve Schneider shot Koresh and then killed himself on April 19, 1993. The Big Spring Police Department was assisted in the search by the Odessa Police Department and the Texas Rangers. He was captured in Abilene, Texas, and returned to Big Spring State Hospital by the Taylor County sheriff's department. In February 1995, the Texas Department of Mental Health and Mental Retardation's Dangerous Review Board declared Roden "not manifestly dangerous". Seven months later, he fled Big Spring for three days before being caught outside the Israeli consulate in New York City, where he caused a disturbance after being denied a visa to Israel. At the time, Roden's son was allegedly living in Israel and Roden's father is described as having Jewish roots. Roden, who claimed to be Jewish, said hitmen trained by the Palestine Liberation Organization were trying to kill him.

On December 8, 1998, Roden escaped again from the Big Spring State Hospital, but was found dead of a heart attack on the grounds of Big Spring State Hospital, where he was confined at the time.
