= David Koresh =

American religious cult leader (1959–1993)

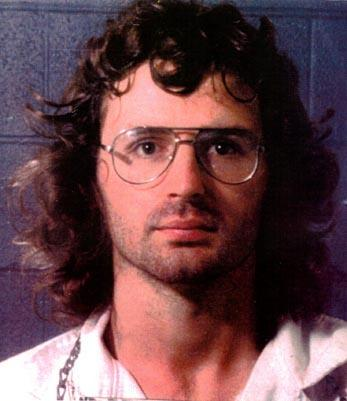
- Photograph of Koresh taken in 1987 by police after his arrest.
- Born: Vernon Wayne Howell; August 17, 1959; Houston, Texas, U.S.
- Died: April 19, 1993 (aged 33); Mount Carmel Center; McLennan County, Texas, U.S.
- Cause of death: Gunshot wound to the head or burns sustained in the Waco siege
- Body discovered: Mount Carmel Center; McLennan County, Texas, U.S.
- Resting place: Tyler Memorial Park Cemetery, Tyler, Texas; 32.35640°N 95.36750°W
- Occupations: Cult leader; preacher; musician
- Known for: 1983 "the Son of God, the Lamb" prophecy; Shootout on November 3, 1987, with George Roden for jurisdiction of Mount Carmel Center; Branch Davidian leadership 1988–1993; Apocalypticism, millenarianism, polygamy; 51-day confrontation and stand-off with the ATF and FBI, February 28, 1993 – April 19, 1993
- Spouse: Rachel Jones
- Children: 16

David Koresh (born Vernon Wayne Howell; August 17, 1959 – April 19, 1993) was an American cult leader and preacher who played a central role in the Waco siege of 1993. As the head of the Branch Davidians, a religious sect, Koresh claimed to be its final prophet. His apocalyptic Biblical teachings, including interpretations of the Book of Revelation and the Seven Seals, attracted various followers.

Coming from a dysfunctional background, Koresh was a member and later a leader of the Branch Davidians, a movement originally led by Benjamin Roden, based at the Mount Carmel Center outside Waco, Texas. There, Koresh competed for dominance with another leader, Benjamin Roden's son George, until Koresh and his followers took over Mount Carmel in 1987. In the early 1990s, he became subject to allegations about polygamy and child sexual abuse by former Branch Davidian associates.

Further allegations related to the Branch Davidians' stockpiling of weapons led the Bureau of Alcohol, Tobacco, and Firearms (ATF) and later the FBI to launch a raid, now known as the Waco siege, on the group's Mount Carmel compound in February 1993. During the 51-day siege and violence that ensued, Koresh was wounded by ATF forces and later died of a gunshot wound in unclear circumstances as the compound was destroyed in a fire.

== Early life ==
Some details of Koresh's life vary among sources, but he was born Vernon Wayne Howell on August 17, 1959, in Houston, Texas, to unmarried parents: 20-year-old Bobby Wayne Howell and 14-year-old Bonnie Sue Clark. Two years after the birth, the relationship broke down. Bonnie continued to flounder, with an abusive first marriage to a Joe Golden quickly ending in divorce. After this, around 1962, unable to cope with her situation, Bonnie moved away to Dallas. She placed her son in the care of her mother and an older sister: Bonnie's mother would pretend to be Koresh's mother; Bonnie would pose as an aunt when she occasionally visited him.

With her marriage in 1964 to merchant marine Roy Winfred Haldeman, Bonnie felt stable enough to raise her son herself. At this time Koresh said he began to be sexually abused by one of his mother's male relatives. In July 1965, Koresh’s half-brother, Rodger Winfred Haldeman, was born. A few weeks later, the Haldeman family set up home in Richardson, Texas. There developed permanent difficulties between Koresh and his stepfather,

Koresh described his early childhood as lonely. Due to his poor study skills and dyslexia partially caused by poor eyesight, he was put in special education classes and bullied by his schoolmates. Matters improved after about the age of 12, when Koresh became interested in sport, which he was good at, and developed his physique. Despite this turnaround, Koresh dropped out of Garland High School in his junior year. He tried various jobs, but was either fired from or abandoned each of them.

At the age of 19, Koresh had an illegal sexual relationship with a 16-year-old girl, who became pregnant. He never saw the resulting daughter: the teenage mother thought him unfit to be a father, so she moved away and refused to see him. He claimed to have become a born-again Christian in the Southern Baptist Church and soon joined his mother's denomination, the Seventh-day Adventist Church. There, Koresh, then 20, and the pastor's daughter, 15-year-old Sandy Berlin, began a two-year relationship. During their courtship, while praying for guidance one day, Koresh allegedly opened his eyes and found the Bible open at Isaiah 34:16, stating that "none should want for her mate". Convinced this was a sign from God, Koresh approached the pastor and told him that God wanted him to have his daughter for a wife; the pastor dismissed the suggestion out of hand and forbade him from ever seeing her again, an instruction that Koresh ignored. With the pastor furious at him and the congregation weary of and repulsed by his sex obsession, Koresh was expelled from the church.

It was now summer 1981, and Koresh's next move was to Waco, Texas, where he joined the Branch Davidians (a splinter group of Davidian Seventh-Day Adventist). Benjamin Roden, who died in 1978, had originated the Branch group in 1955 with new teachings that were not connected with the original Davidians.

== Ascent to leadership of the Branch Davidians ==
In 1983, Koresh began claiming the gift of prophecy. David Thibodeau, in his 1999 book, A Place Called Waco, speculated that he had a sexual relationship with Lois Roden, the widow of Benjamin Roden and leader of the sect, who was then in her late 60s. Koresh eventually began to claim that God had chosen him to father a child by Lois, who would be the Chosen One. In 1983, Lois allowed Koresh to begin teaching his message, "The Serpent's Root", which caused controversy in the group. Lois's son George Roden, intended to be the group's next leader, considered Koresh an interloper.

When Koresh announced that God had instructed him to marry Rachel Jones (who then added Koresh to her name), calm ensued at the Mount Carmel Center, but it proved only temporary. A fire destroyed a $500,000 administration building and press; George Roden said Koresh started the fire, but Koresh replied that "no man set that fire" and that it was a judgment of God. Roden, claiming to have the support of the majority of the sect, forced Koresh and his group off the property at gunpoint. Koresh and around 25 followers set up camp at Palestine, Texas, 90 miles (140 km) from Waco, where they lived under rough conditions in buses and tents for the next two years. During this time, Koresh undertook recruitment of new followers in California, the United Kingdom, Israel, and Australia. That same year, he traveled to Israel, where he claimed he had a vision that he was the modern-day Cyrus.

The founder of the Davidian movement, Victor Houteff, wanted to be God's implement and establish the Davidic kingdom in Israel. Koresh also wanted to be God's tool and set up the Davidic kingdom in Jerusalem. At least until 1990, he believed the place of his martyrdom might be in Israel; however, by 1991, he was convinced that his martyrdom would be in the U.S. instead of in Israel. He said the prophecies of Daniel would be fulfilled in Waco and that the Mount Carmel Center was the Davidic kingdom.

After being exiled to the Palestine camp, Koresh and his followers eked out a primitive existence. When Lois died in 1986, the exiled Branch Davidians wondered if they would ever be able to return to the Mount Carmel Center, but despite the displacement "Koresh now enjoyed the loyalty of the majority of the [Branch Davidian] community". In 1987, George Roden exhumed at least one body from the community cemetery. Roden said he was just moving the cemetery, while Koresh claimed that Roden had issued a challenge to resurrect the body (and that whoever resurrected the body would be the new leader). Koresh went to the authorities to file charges against Roden for illegally exhuming a corpse, but was told he would have to show proof (such as a photograph of the corpse).

Koresh seized the opportunity to seek criminal prosecution of Roden by returning to the Mount Carmel Center with seven armed followers, allegedly attempting to get photographic proof of the exhumation. Koresh's group was discovered by Roden, and a gunfight broke out. When the sheriff arrived, Roden had suffered gunshot wounds to the hand and chest and was pinned down behind a tree. As a result of the incident, Koresh and his followers were charged with attempted murder. At the trial, Koresh explained that he went to the Mount Carmel Center to uncover evidence of criminal disturbance of a corpse by Roden. Koresh's followers were acquitted, and in Koresh's case, a mistrial was declared.

In 1989, Roden murdered Wayman Dale Adair with an axe blow to the skull after Adair stated his belief that he was the true messiah. Roden claimed the man was sent by Koresh to kill him. He was judged insane and confined to a psychiatric hospital at Big Spring, Texas. Since Roden owed thousands of dollars in unpaid taxes on the Mount Carmel Center, Koresh and his followers were able to raise the money and reclaim the property. Roden continued to harass the Koresh faction by filing legal papers while imprisoned. When Koresh and his followers reclaimed the Mount Carmel Center, they discovered that tenants who had rented from Roden had left behind a meth lab, which Koresh reported to the local police department and asked to have removed.

Koresh was infatuated with American singer Madonna. God, he claimed, had even said to him, "I will give thee Madonna."

== Name change ==
Vernon Howell filed a petition in California State Superior Court in Pomona on May 15, 1990, to legally change his name "for publicity and business purposes" to David Koresh. On August 28, 1990, Judge Robert Martinez granted the petition.

His first name, David, symbolized a lineage directly to the biblical King David, from whom the new messiah would descend. Koresh (כּוֹרֶשׁ, Koresh) is the Biblical name of Cyrus the Great, a Persian king who is named a messiah for freeing Jews during the Babylonian captivity. By taking the name of David Koresh, he was "professing himself to be the spiritual descendant of King David although he had no DNA to connect him with the peoples of the Mediterranean much less King David, a messianic figure carrying out a divinely commissioned errand."

== Allegations of child abuse and statutory rape ==
Koresh was alleged to have been involved in multiple incidents of physical and sexual abuse of children. His doctrine of the House of David did lead to "marriages" with both married and single women in the Branch Davidians.

A six-month investigation of sexual abuse allegations by the Texas Child Protection Services in 1992 failed to turn up any evidence, possibly because the Branch Davidians concealed the spiritual marriage of Koresh to Rachel's younger sister, Michele, when she was 12, by assigning her a surrogate husband (David Thibodeau, who was 10 years younger than Koresh) for the sake of appearances. Regarding the allegations of physical abuse, no evidence was ever found. In one widely reported incident, ex-members claimed that Koresh became irritated with the cries of his son Cyrus and spanked the child severely for several minutes on three consecutive visits to the child's bedroom. In a second report, a man involved in a custody battle visited the Mount Carmel Center and claimed to have seen the beating of a young boy with a stick.

Finally, the FBI's justification for forcing an end to the 51-day stand-off was predicated on the charge that Koresh was abusing children inside the Mount Carmel Center. Allegations had been made that he had fathered children with underage girls in the Branch Davidians. In the hours that followed the deadly conflagration, Attorney General Janet Reno told reporters, "We had specific information that babies were being beaten." However, FBI Director William Sessions publicly denied the charge and told reporters that they had no such information about child abuse inside the Mount Carmel Center. A careful examination of the other child abuse charges found the evidence to be weak and ambiguous, casting doubt on the allegations.

The allegations of child abuse largely stem from detractors and ex-members. The 1993 Justice Department report cites allegations of child sexual and physical abuse. Legal scholars point out that the Bureau of Alcohol, Tobacco and Firearms (ATF) had no legal jurisdiction in the matter of child protection, and these accounts appear to have been inserted by the ATF to inflame the case against Koresh. For example, the account of former Branch Davidian Jeannine Bunds is reproduced in an ATF affidavit. She said that Koresh had fathered at least 15 children with various women and girls, and that she had personally delivered seven of these infants. Bunds also says that Koresh would annul all marriages of couples who joined the group and had exclusive sexual access to the women and girls. Thibodeau, a student of Koresh and one of the few to escape the fire that destroyed the compound, stated in 2018 that while he considered Koresh a friend, he "certainly was guilty of something. He was either a polygamist or he was guilty of statutory rape. Probably both."

In his book, James Tabor states that on a videotape that was sent out of the compound during the siege, Koresh acknowledged that he had fathered more than 12 children by several "wives". On March 3, 1993, during negotiations to secure the release of the remaining children, Koresh advised hostage negotiators that: "My children are different than those others," referring to his direct lineage versus those children whom he had previously released.

Bruce Perry, the chief of psychiatry at Texas Children's Hospital who led the team that cared for the twenty-one children who survived the siege of the Davidian compound, wrote after a two-month investigation that "the children released from Ranch Apocalypse do not appear to have been victims of sexual abuse." However, in an article published May 4, 1993, Perry started that "the kids became increasingly open about 11 and 12-year-old girls being David's wives." He additionally stated that it was clear that the status of wife included having sex.

While Perry's reports about the Children of Waco experiencing physical abuse are contradictory, he reported that they were "likely exposed to inappropriate concepts of sexuality," and subject to "a whole variety of destructive emotional techniques ... including shame, coercion, fear, intimidation, humiliation, guilt, overt aggression and power." Perry has reiterated this view as late as 2018.

== Raid and siege by federal authorities ==
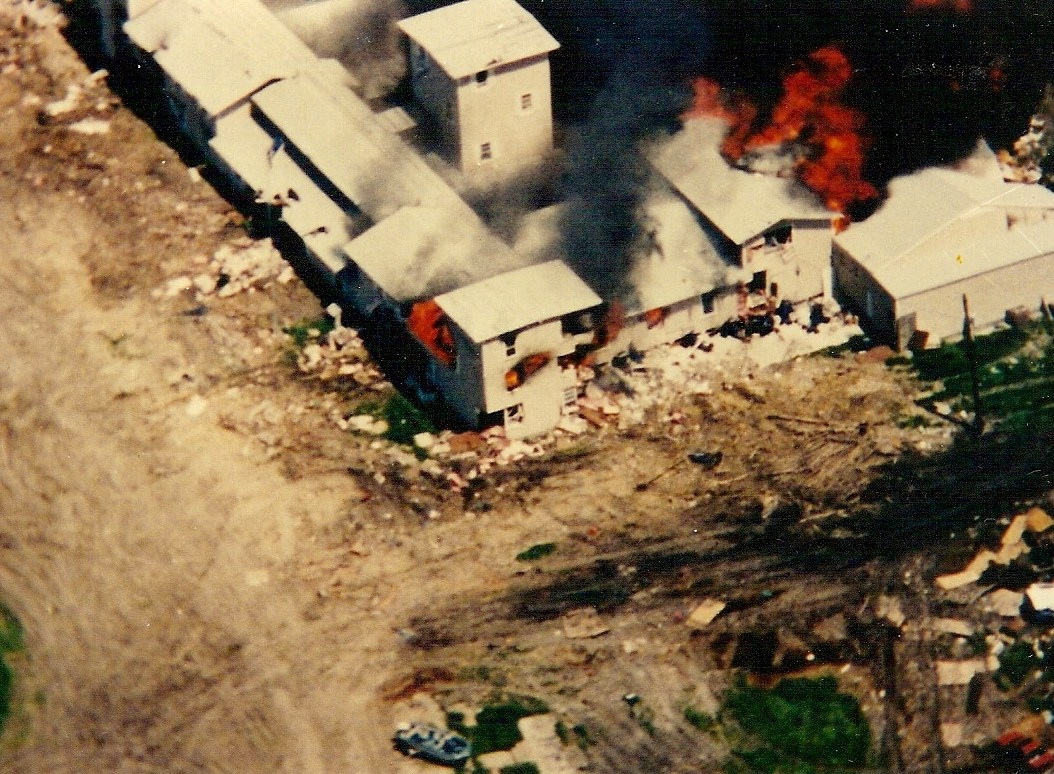
FBI photo of the Mount Carmel Center engulfed in flames on April 19, 1993

The Waco siege began on February 28, 1993, when the ATF raided Mount Carmel Center. The ensuing gun battle resulted in the deaths of four ATF agents and six Branch Davidians. Shortly after the initial raid, the FBI Hostage Rescue Team took command of the federal operation because the FBI has jurisdiction over incidents involving the deaths of federal agents. The negotiating team established contact with Koresh inside the compound. Communication over the next 51 days included telephone exchanges with various FBI negotiators.

Koresh himself had been seriously injured by gunshot wounds to his wrist and his left side. As the standoff continued, he and his closest male associates negotiated delays so that he could write religious documents, which he said he needed to complete before his surrender. Koresh's conversations with the negotiators were dense and they also included biblical imagery. The FBI negotiators treated the situation as a hostage crisis.

The siege of the Mount Carmel Center ended on April 19, 1993, when U.S. Attorney General Janet Reno approved recommendations of FBI officials to proceed with a final advance in which the Branch Davidians would be removed from the Mount Carmel Center by force. In an attempt to flush Koresh out of the stronghold, the FBI resorted to pumping CS gas into the compound with the aid of an M728 Combat Engineer Vehicle, which was equipped with a battering ram. In the course of the advance, the Mount Carmel Center caught fire. Barricaded inside the building, 79 Branch Davidians perished in the ensuing blaze; 21 of these victims were children under the age of 16.

Coroner reports showed many Branch Davidians died from single gunshot wounds to the head – Koresh, then 33, was one of them. A postmortem on his badly burned remains could not determine whether he died by suicide or was killed. One FBI official speculated that Steve Schneider, Koresh's right-hand man, "probably realized that he was dealing with a fraud" and so shot and killed Koresh before turning the gun on himself. The medical examiner reported 20 people, including five children under the age of 14, had been shot, and a three-year-old had been stabbed in the chest.

== Legacy ==
Koresh is buried at Memorial Park Cemetery, Tyler, Texas, in the "Last Supper" section. Several of his albums were released, including Voice of Fire, in 1994. In 2004, Koresh's 1968 Chevrolet Camaro, which had been damaged during the raid, sold for $37,000 at auction. It is now owned by Ghost Adventures host Zak Bagans.

Timothy McVeigh and Terry Nichols cited the Waco siege as their motivation for the Oklahoma City bombing of April 19, 1995, which was timed to coincide with the second anniversary of the Waco assault.

Three documentary films have been made about the siege, including different versions of Waco: The Rules of Engagement, Waco: A New Revelation, and Waco: Madman or Messiah. In 2018, BBC Radio 5 Live created a radio podcast titled End of Days, which was about the death and life of Koresh, his involvement in the Waco siege, and the recruitment of people who lived in Nottingham, Manchester, and London into the Branch Davidians. The Court TV (now TruTV) television series Mugshots released an episode about Koresh. A Mexican movie was made entitled "Tragedia en Waco" or "Tragedia: Sucedio en Monte Carmelo Waco Texas", 1993, written by Ulf Kjell Gür. aired by EstrellaTV in April 2021.

Koresh is portrayed by Taylor Kitsch in the 2018 miniseries Waco. However, in the sequel series Waco: The Aftermath he is portrayed by Keean Johnson. He was also one of the sources of inspiration used to create the fictional cult leader Joseph Seed in the 2018 action-adventure video game Far Cry 5. In 2011, British indie rock band The Indelicates released a concept album, David Koresh Superstar, about Koresh and the Waco siege. He was also one of the sources of inspiration used to create the fictional cult leader Salem Koresh in the 2021 action-adventure video game Outriders.

A Netflix series called Waco: American Apocalypse, was released in March 2023. The series encompasses three episodes and features real and never-before-released footage and interviews with surviving cult members and others involved.

== See also ==
- List of messiah claimants
- List of people claimed to be Jesus
- List of Seventh-day Adventists
- Messiah complex
