= Victor Houteff =

Founder of the Davidian Seventh-day Adventists (1885–1955)

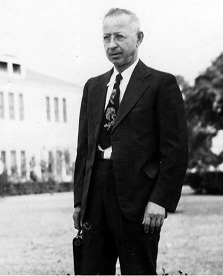
- Born: March 2, 1885; Raicovo, Eastern Rumelia, Ottoman Empire
- Died: February 5, 1955 (aged 69); Waco, Texas, U.S.
- Resting place: Rosemound Cemetery; 31.52420°N 97.10830°W
- Citizenship: American
- Occupations: Author, Sabbath teacher, Davidian Seventh-day Adventist
- Notable work: The Shepherd's Rod, volume 1 and 2
- Spouse: Florence Marcella Hermanson Eakin

Victor Tasho Houteff (Bulgarian; Виктор Ташо Хутев; March 2, 1885 – February 5, 1955) was a Bulgarian-American religious leader who was the founder of the Davidian Seventh-day Adventist organization, known as The Shepherd's Rod.

== Early life ==
Houteff was born in Raicovo, Eastern Rumelia, (modern day Bulgaria), and, as a child, baptized as a member of the Bulgarian Orthodox Church. As a young man, he was engaged in the mercantile trade. In 1907, he and his brothers emigrated to the United States after, according to Victor Houteff's testimony, a mob had taken up arms against his family and forced them onto a boat. Houteff would, on several occasions, return to visit his family, many of whom now live in the U.S. Victor Houteff arrived in the U.S. virtually penniless. He soon found work as a hotelier and grocer in the state of Illinois. In 1919, he joined the Seventh-day Adventist Church.

In the midst of the Roaring Twenties, Houteff journeyed west to California to be closer to Seventh-day Adventist communities, like Loma Linda. In Los Angeles, California, he took a job as a salesman for the Maytag Corporation, selling washers and other household appliances. Houteff soon saved enough money to start his own company, which manufactured wholesome confectionery candies or, as Houteff himself referred to them, "health sweets."

== Adventism ==
During the 1920s, Victor Houteff, a strict Seventh-day Adventist, became a Sabbath School teacher at the Exposition Park Church in Los Angeles. A keen student of the Bible, Houteff began to delve deeply into it and the writings of Ellen G. White. His Bible study classes in the church lasted longer and became more complex, attracting large groups of Adventists every week. Houteff's particular focus was the Scriptures from Isaiah, in chapters 54–66. Houteff encountered opposition to his interpretation from the established Seventh-day Adventist Church; and, eventually, Houteff and a large number of his Bible class were disfellowshiped. Houteff persisted, moving his class of more than fifty students to a large house across the street from the church, where he continued to study and teach. Houteff attempted to interest the Adventist California Conference in his Biblical findings, which he believed were really a continuation of the Three Angels Message of Revelation 14. The Three Angels Message is one of the basic doctrines of the Seventh-day Adventist Church.

In 1929, Houteff completed his doctrinal studies and submitted them in the form of a book entitled The Shepherd's Rod. In the preface to the manuscript that would become The Shepherd's Rod, Volume 1, he wrote,

It is the intention of this book to reveal the truth of the 144,000 mentioned in Revelation 7 but the chief object of this publication is to bring about a reformation among God's people. The truth herein contained is divided into seven sections, giving proof from seven different angles, to prevent any doubt or confusion. This subject is made clear by the use of the Bible and the writings given by the Spirit of Prophecy.

The truth revealed here is of great importance to the church just now because of the foretold danger which God's people are soon to meet. It calls for decided action on the part of the believers to separate themselves from all worldlings and worldliness; to anchor themselves on the Solid Rock by obedience to all the truth known to this denomination, if we must escape the great ruin. "The Lord's voice crieth unto the city, and the man of wisdom shall see thy name: Hear ye the rod, and who hath appointed it." Micah 6:9.

Victor Houteff held similar views to Ellen White's in not directly calling himself a prophet, preferring to call his work a call for reformation. Some comparisons can be made in the mold of A. T. Jones and E. J. Waggoner. He was a believer in the doctrine of Justification by Faith. However, he did not deny at any time that he was used by God to bring the "very last message" to the SDA Church He believed that his message was that prophesied in Micah 6:9 and Micah 7:14. A small, quiet man, he felt it his duty, as a believer in "present truth" and a Bible Christian to reach out to his Church, thinking that his doctrine would lead to conservative reforms in the denomination. His book, published on December 4, 1930, caused a great stir in the Seventh-day Adventist Church, evidenced by the fact that four years later, Houteff was given a hearing by twelve of the Adventist Church's leaders.

== The Agreement and response ==
We, as members of the Tabernacle Church of S.D.A. of Fullerton, Calif., after counseling with Victor T. Houteff concerning the teachings of The Shepherd's Rod, respectfully request that you appoint a committee of ten or twelve "brethren of experience" to meet with Brother Houteff while he places before them the evidence for his belief in the fundamentals of his message. The subjects to be considered are – "The Harvest," "Ezekiel 9," "The Leopard Beast of Rev. 13," "Hosea chapters 1–2," and "Matt. 20." In these studies Brother Houteff is to use only the writings of the Bible and the Spirit of Prophecy.

The time used is not to exceed one week.

After each study the committee selected may retire for counsel, and may then submit its evidence for mistakes in Brother Houteff's teaching, such evidence to be drawn from the Bible and the Spirit of Prophecy only.

If after the first study mistakes may be substantiated from authority mentioned above, further studies are not to be given. The same conditions are to prevail after each succeeding study.

In case the committee find error in the teaching of The Shepherd's Rod, and are able to refute same by the teachings of the Bible and the Spirit of Prophecy Brother Houteff agrees to renounce the advocacy of The Shepherd's Rod, and to make public renunciation of same.

Brother Houteff also agrees to discontinue the propagation of The Shepherd's Rod, so far as he can control same, in the Pacific Union Conference, during the time this investigation is being made.

The conditions hereby entered into are in compliance with the instruction given in Testimonies, Vol. 5, p. 293; Testimonies on Sabbath School Work, pp. 65–66.

For The Shepherd's Rod,

V.T. HOUTEFF"

The response:

Dear Mr. Houteff:

In harmony with your written request of January 18 for a hearing before a body of leading brethren, the Union Conference Committee has set aside Monday, February 19, for this purpose.

This is to notify you that the meeting will be held at 10 A.M. on that date, at 4800 South Hoover Street, Los Angeles.

This will confirm the verbal notice given you this morning by Elders C.S. Prout and J.W. Rich.

Yours very sincerely,

(Signed) GLENN CALKINS."

== The hearing ==
On February 19, 1934, in Los Angeles, California Houteff began his presentation to the Pacific Union Conference Committee of twelve. Their number included A. G. Daniells, former General Conference President, who served as committee chair, and noted Adventist scholars, F.C. Gilbert and H. M. S. Richards, founder of the Voice of Prophecy, a popular Adventist radio show. To Houteff's adherents, the Adventist theologians appeared somewhat disdainful of the self-taught Bulgarian. H.M.S. Richards Jr. later claimed that he had taken, "careful notes," though according to Pastor M. J. Bingham, Houteff's secretary and friend, who was present at the session, Richards behaved churlishly towards Houteff by propping his feet up on a windowsill and paying scant attention to Houteff's presentation, which he had at length prepared at the committee's request.

After the very first study, an adjournment was called by the committee. Some believe that this adjournment and subsequent termination of the agreement for studies, was a direct violation of the agreement as per the "Agreement" as stated above. Despite the protest from Houteff, four weeks later, the Committee released its official reply, "A Reply to The Shepherd's Rod", which was authored by Professor O. J. Graf. In his rebuttal of the committee's reply, Houteff complained that a number of his written statements had been taken out of context, or summarily dismissed without proper consideration. He further argued that in Graf's response nothing was mentioned about the interpreted main points of the very first study (the Harvest) as per the Agreement outline. Nevertheless, the committee's verdict was final. Later Houteff wrote a small booklet explaining his views on the meeting.

Though he had been forced out of the SDA Church, Houteff had no intention of leaving it. Since the Church leadership had rejected his message, he took it to the people with great success. In 1934, his evangelistic endeavors began to bear fruit. Several thousand Adventists accepted Houteff's doctrine of the Shepherd's Rod. His Message began to have a considerable impact on the Adventist Church, which, at that time, counted less than 250,000 members worldwide. In 1934, Houteff formed the Universal Publishing Association. While he had no intention of forming his own church, he did wish to use every medium within his power to spread his message within the SDA Church. He viewed the Adventist Church as backsliding from the beliefs upon which it had been founded a hundred years before, and saw his message as a method of solving the many doctrinal disagreements which had arisen as the Church expanded in the 1900s after Ellen G. White's death. The first chapter of Houteff's book, The Shepherd's Rod, dealt with the Biblical 144,000 of Revelation, Chapter 7.

Houteff's teachings are inclusive of a message intended directly to the Seventh-day Adventist members, in which God will have a judgment upon his people (Ezekiel 9) and have a purification in his church, resulting in the 144,000 surviving. This belief of a small number of SDA eventually surviving the judgment of God, was not unique to Houteff. Ellen White had made similar statements. These survivors of the judgment are to finalize God's closing work in Earth's history, and consequently converting the remaining non-Seventh-day Adventists throughout the world ("the remnant") to Commandment keeping and Sabbath adherence, making up The Great Multitude of Revelation 7:9.This message is known as the Loud Cry message.

Though the Adventist Church has had no official stand on the 144,000 and its sister group of "those with", or The Great Multitude of Revelation 7:9, it rejected Houteff's teaching that the 144,000 believers of Revelation 7 and 14 were Adventists, and that The Great Multitude was made up of non-Adventist Christians.

== Later years and Mount Carmel ==
In 1934 Houteff wrote in his publication, The Symbolic Code,

Being deprived of all denominational advantages such as sanitariums, health food factories, printing presses, etc., perhaps it may be necessary for a rural location for the establishment of a combined unit to assist in carrying the message to the church until the "siege against it" shall be successfully culminated in a glorious victory when "the zeal of the Lord of hosts will perform this." (Isa. 9:7.) This has been suggested by a sister and her husband who have had considerable experience in this line. Therefore we call the attention of all who are standing in the light to give consideration to such an enterprise. Any one having knowledge of such a location and the necessary information regarding it, please communicate it to this office. Our prayers for such an undertaking in behalf of God's people will be answered by whatever the results to this call might be.

The group, casually referred to as The Rod, built Mt. Carmel Center, a rural community and headquarters near Waco, Texas.

During the late 1930s, while visiting his family in Bulgaria, Houteff, now an American citizen, was once again run out of his native land, this time by the Bulgarian National Socialist Movement, which objected to his ministry.

Houteff died of heart failure at Hillcrest Hospital, Waco, Texas on February 5, 1955. He is buried in Rosemound Cemetery, Waco.
