= Mount Carmel Center =

Former dwelling used by the Branch Davidians in Waco, Texas

New Mount Carmel Center
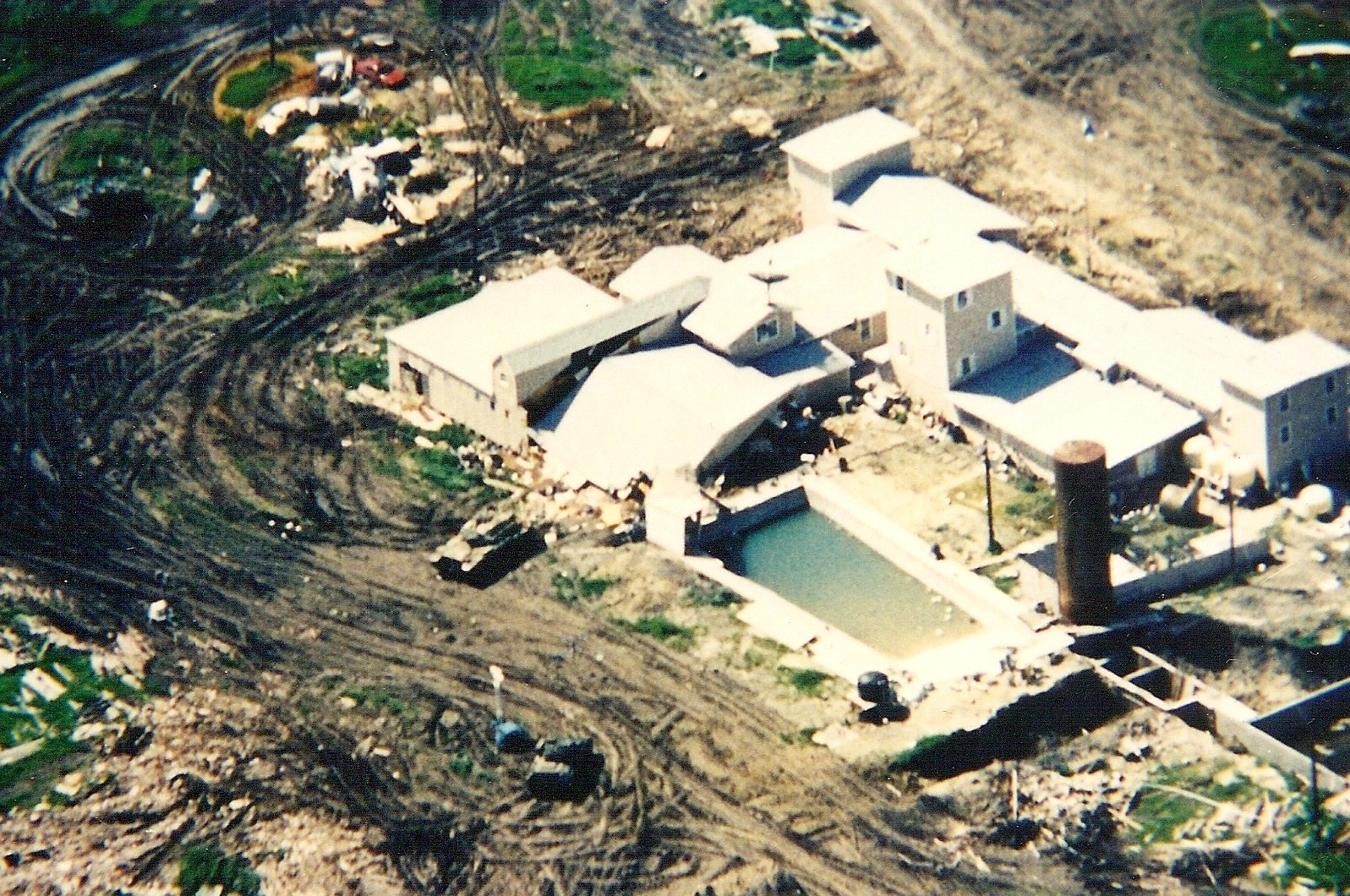
- New Mount Carmel Center during the Waco siege, with an M728 Combat Engineer Vehicle bringing down the roof of the gymnasium

- Location within Texas
- Alternative names: Branch Davidian Compound

General information
- Status: Turned into museum
- Location: Axtell, McLennan County, Texas, United States of America
- Coordinates: 31°35′45″N 96°59′17″W
- Opening: c. 1958
- Destroyed: April 19, 1993

The New Mount Carmel Center was a large group of buildings used by the Branch Davidian religious group located near Axtell, Texas, 20 miles (32 km) north-east of Waco. The Branch Davidians were established by Victor Houteff in 1929 as a breakaway sect from Davidian Seventh-day Adventists, and was later led by David Koresh starting in the 1980s. Named after the Biblical mountain Mount Carmel in Israel, it was the site of the 51-day Waco siege. The siege began on February 28, 1993, when federal agents attempted to execute a warrant and arrest some Davidians living inside. A subsequent firefight left four Bureau of Alcohol, Tobacco, and Firearms (ATF) agents and six Davidians dead. At the end of the siege, on April 19, 1993, a fire started, leaving 76 Davidians dead.

== Etymology ==
Some news reports about the siege referred to it as the "Branch Davidian compound". The Mount Carmel name derives from a particular verse from the Bible, on which the Branch Davidians partially based their beliefs:

Notwithstanding the land shall be desolate because of them that dwell therein, for the fruit of their doings. Feed thy people with thy rod, the flock of thine heritage, which dwell solitarily in the wood, in the midst of Carmel: let them feed in Bashan and Gilead, as in the days of old.

— Micah 7:14

== History ==
In 1935, Shepherd's Rod (also known as the Davidians) founder Victor Houteff established the original Davidian headquarters at Mount Carmel Center near Lake Waco west of the town. After Houteff's death in 1955, his widow Florence usurped the leadership and began selling off parcels of the land, as the neighboring city of Waco began encroaching upon the Mount Carmel Community. In 1957, she sold off the last of the property and bought a 941-acre (381 ha) property in the countryside northeast of Waco, christened New Mount Carmel. Today, Waco's Mount Carmel Drive runs through the Old Mount Carmel area, and nearby Charboneau and Hermanson Drives are named after key Davidian families.

In 1962, Florence Houteff announced that she was disbanding the Davidian organization, with the assets to be sold off and the proceeds disbursed among her Executive Council. This arrangement was opposed by many members. Most of the New Mount Carmel property was acquired by the Double EE Ranch, but the Branch Davidians retained a core 77.8-acre (31.5 ha) area around the administrative building.

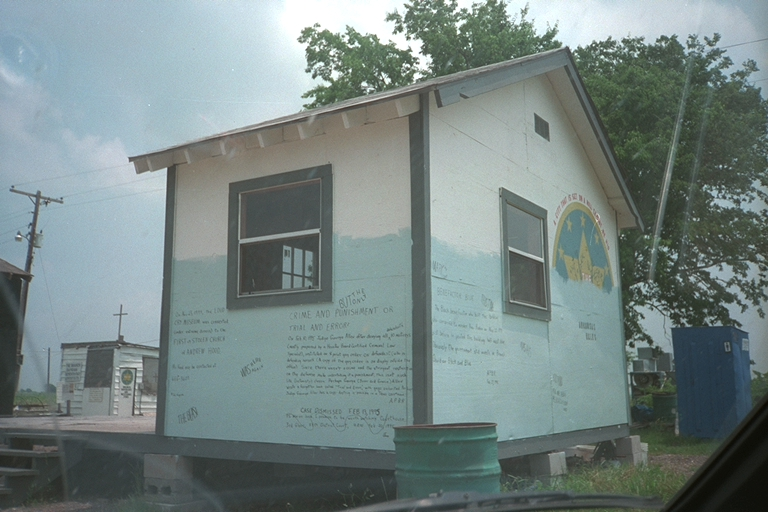
Buildings at Mount Carmel Center in May 1995. They have since burned down.

The fragmentation of Mount Carmel caused a schism in the already permanently-splintered Davidian Seventh-day Adventist movement. Some post-Carmel Davidian groups have also named their headquarters Mount Carmel Center, seeking to carry on its past traditions. Davidians based in Salem, South Carolina use the name, as well as a group that broke away from them in Mountaindale, New York. Some of the Mountaindale Davidians came to believe that Victor Houteff never wanted to abandon Old Mount Carmel and in the early 1990s moved back to Waco. They established themselves in a building on Mount Carmel Drive, constructed by Houteff's Davidians. They are across the street from the Vanguard School, a prep school whose buildings were also originally built by the Davidians. Other Davidian groups believe that Mount Carmel represented a doctrinal era in the Davidian Seventh Day Adventist Movement, an era which is now past.

In 1993, three buildings at the former Branch Davidian compound were destroyed in a fire that was deemed suspicious. They were the home of Amo Bishop Roden, wife of former Branch Davidian leader George Roden, and two museums she used to record the group's history. There have been various sects and generations of communities that have resided on and/or used the property east of Waco on Double EE Ranch Road. Not all groups or individuals within these groups share the same religious theology or approach to spirituality. Efforts to memorialize the events of 1993 on the property have been altered over the years since 1993.

Nothing remains of the Mount Carmel Center today other than its concrete foundation components, as the entire site was bulldozed two weeks after the end of the siege. Only a small chapel, built years after the siege, stands on the former site. It is still used by the remaining Branch Davidians as a place of worship and memorial.

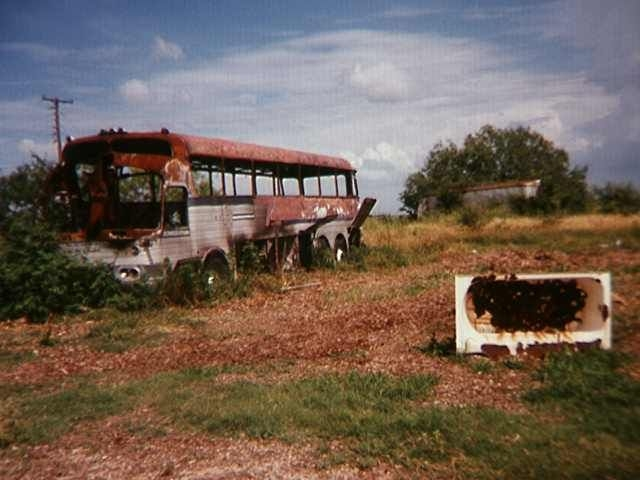
Remnants of bus and bathtub in ruins at center in June 1997

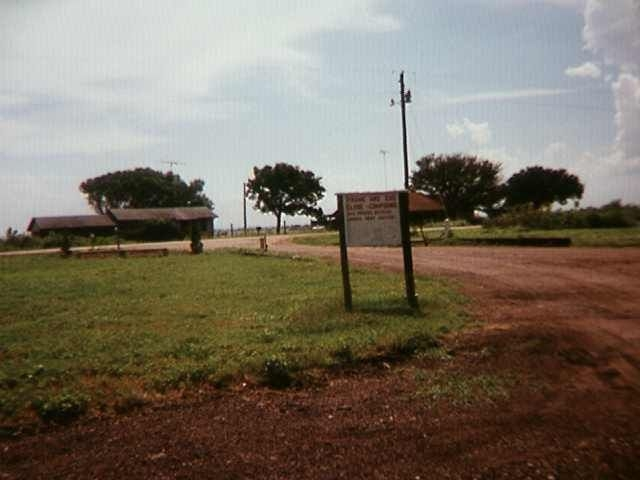
The entrance to the Mount Carmel Center in June 1997

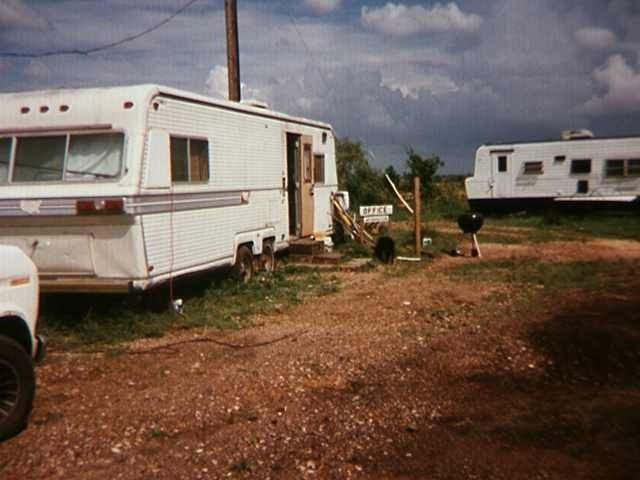
Trailer serves as "office" for center in June 1997

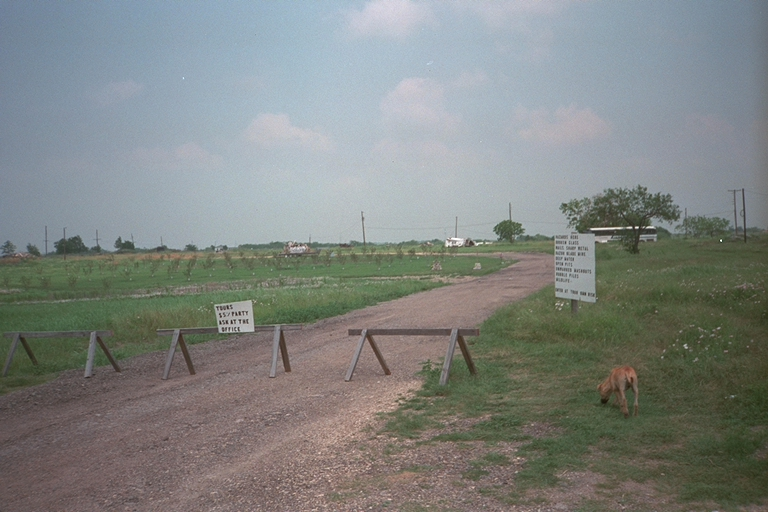
The entrance in May 1995
