= Mark Wexler =

American documentary filmmaker and photojournalist (born 1955)

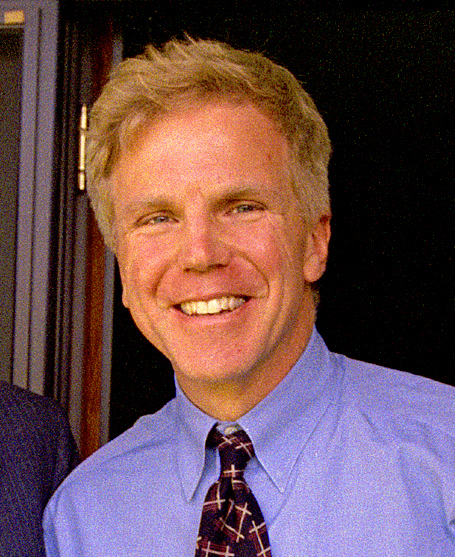
- Wexler in 2015
- Born: Mark Simon Wexler; 1955 (age 70–71); Chicago, Illinois, U.S.
- Occupations: Documentary filmmaker; photojournalist

Mark Simon Wexler (born 1955) is an American documentary filmmaker and photojournalist.

== Family ==
His father, Haskell Wexler, was a cinematographer and filmmaker who won two Oscars. His mother, Marian Witt-Wexler, was a painter. Wexler's half-brother Jeff Wexler is an Oscar-nominated sound mixer. Actress Daryl Hannah and film director Tanya Wexler are cousins via his uncle Jerrold Wexler, a Chicago Real Estate Developer.

== Personal life ==
Wexler was born in Chicago, but grew up in Hollywood, California.

He majored in cultural anthropology in college.

People Magazine named him one of America's 100 Most Eligible Bachelors.

The Washington Post dubbed him "our latter-day Phileas Fogg" following publication of his Los Angeles Times article "True Confessions of a Mileage Maniac" about his 30-day global circumnavigation, entirely financed with Frequent Flier miles. The accompanying self portraits were published in The Smithsonian Air & Space Magazine.

Wexler was interviewed live on The Today Show regarding his expertise on the topic of life extension.

He had a tumultuous relationship with his famous, and famously opinionated father Haskell Wexler. Their attempts at reconciliation were documented in Tell Them Who You Are which was shortlisted for an Oscar in 2005.

== Career: Motion ==
In 1996, Wexler released Me & My Matchmaker, an intimate portrait of a feisty and meddling Jewish matchmaker in Chicago who made it her personal mission to get the filmmaker married. The film won the Audience Award for Best Documentary at the Slamdance Film Festival. Film critic Roger Ebert wrote that it was "amazing and touching." Timeout London said it was "... funny, fascinating, and finally faintly disturbing."

Wexler's 2001 film, Air Force One, aired as a prime time PBS - National Geographic special. As the first filmmaker ever granted unprecedented behind-the-scenes access, Wexler told the story of the “Flying White House” both in terms of its unique technological and historical significance. The film included original interviews with President Jimmy Carter, President George H. W. Bush, President Bill Clinton, and President George W. Bush.

The 2005 Oscar shortlisted film Tell Them Who You Are was an exploration of Wexler's fraught relationship with his father, legendary filmmaker and two-time Oscar-winning cinematographer Haskell Wexler. It won a place on Roger Ebert's Top 10 Documentaries of the year, The Associated Press' Top Ten films of the year, as well as praise from The New York Times, the Los Angeles Times, and others. Judd Apatow spoke about the film on NPR's Morning Edition, recounting his reaction to a scene where, after viewing the film, Haskell tells Mark he's "a hell of a filmmaker". Apatow said "I sat in bed, my wife is sleeping, and I'm just bawling like a little girl. You can tell this man has been waiting his entire life to hear his dad say that sincerely." The Los Angeles Times declared that the film " ...is meta-layered cinema" which "...fits squarely into the new genre of nonfiction film that perhaps should be called the Me Documentary, the personal film that is indelibly shaped by the presence of the filmmaker."

Wexler's 2010 film, How to Live Forever, followed the filmmaker's quest for eternal youth. In interviews with a wide variety of subjects, including fitness legend Jack LaLanne, author Ray Bradbury, futurist Aubrey de Gray and inventor Ray Kurzweil, the film invited viewers to consider ways to live a long life, but one that is also meaningful. The New York Times wrote that it was “Engaging… remarkably spry and lighthearted.” The film was selected by AARP The Magazine as a Movie For Grownups, noting that "For boomers especially, How to Live Forever is the perfect film at the perfect moment."

== Career: Still ==
As a photojournalist, Wexler has covered assignments in over ninety countries. His work has appeared in publications such as Time, Life, National Geographic, Smithsonian, The Los Angeles Times and The New York Times. He is the recipient of three World Press Awards for Outstanding Photojournalism, one in the Science category and two in the Sports category.

Wexler has been a contributor to eight volumes in the Day in the Life book series. His photographs are also featured in the books The Power to Heal, Passage to Vietnam and 24 Hours in Cyberspace. His own book, Hollywood, was published by Random House. Wexler has exhibited his work in galleries around the world, including the International Center of Photography in New York.
