= How to Live Forever =

- Directed by: Mark Wexler
- Written by: Mark Wexler; Robert DeMaio
- Produced by: Mark Wexler; Mark Luethi
- Starring: Suzanne Somers; Phyllis Diller; Ray Bradbury
- Cinematography: Sarah Levy; Allan Palmer; Robin Probyn
- Edited by: Robert DeMaio
- Music by: Steven Thomas Cavit
- Distributed by: Variance Films
- Release date: October 2009 (Hamptons)
- Running time: 92 minutes
- Country: United States
- Language: English

How to Live Forever is a 2009 documentary film about longevity, written by Mark Wexler and Robert DeMaio. It is also directed by Wexler, and the film follows him on a three-year pilgrimage to discover the best practices and philosophies to help mitigate "the uncool trappings of old age." With the death of his mother (artist Marian Witt-Wexler) and the arrival of an AARP card, Wexler begins to wonder if one can truly achieve immortality. He interviews an eclectic group of celebrities, health care professionals, centenarians, followers of Laughter Yoga, and scientists contemplating technology’s impact on the average lifespan in an attempt to conquer death.

== Interviews ==
Wexler visits the home of fitness legend Jack LaLanne and his wife Elaine for a personal training session and a raw food smoothie. Often called the "godfather of fitness", Jack LaLanne was among the first to publicly preach the health benefits of regular exercise and a good diet. In 1936, when LaLanne was 21 years old, he opened one of the nation’s first fitness gyms, and in the 1950s he filmed a series of television exercise programs. LaLanne invented several exercise machines, was inducted to the California Hall of Fame in 2008, and has a star on the Hollywood Walk of Fame.

In the documentary, Suzanne Somers speaks to the International Congress on Anti-Aging Medicine in Las Vegas. She describes the array of hormones that she takes daily, explaining why she is a supporter of bioidentical hormone replacement therapy. Author of numerous diet books and autobiographies, Somers also wrote Ageless: The Naked Truth About Bioidentical Hormones. Somers is an actress, author, and businesswoman, best known for her role as Chrissy Snow on Three’s Company.

Aubrey de Grey is a British author and theoretician in the field of gerontology. His studies focus on researching and developing tissue-repair strategies intended to prolong lifespans. De Grey is the editor-in-chief of the academic journal Rejuvenation Research, author of The Mitochondrial Free Radical Theory of Aging, and co-author of Ending Aging. Wexler, as well as news sources like The New York Times, the BBC, and Fortune, have interviewed de Grey to learn more about his theories on anti-aging.

Also featured in the documentary is celebrated American writer Ray Bradbury, who is best known for his books Fahrenheit 451, The Martian Chronicles, and Something Wicked This Way Comes. The Pulitzer board recognized Bradbury "for his distinguished, prolific, and deeply influential career as an unmatched author of science fiction and fantasy." Many of his works have been adapted into television shows or films. When asked if he's afraid of getting old, Bradbury replies, "No, I’ve never had that fear; I knew that I was collecting truths along the way."

Comedian Phyllis Diller had maintained the stage presence of a boisterous, eccentric housewife with an unusual laugh in stand-up and sitcoms since 1952. She guest-starred in dozens of television shows and also voiced the Queen in Disney’s A Bug's Life, Jimmy’s grandmother in Nickelodeon’s Jimmy Neutron, and Peter Griffin’s mother in Family Guy. In the documentary, Diller states she believes comedy is important to health, maintaining that "laughter fluffs up every cell in the body."

Claiming to have been born in 1906, Pierre Jean Buster Martin was a 104-year-old beer drinking and chain-smoking marathon runner. He did not include fish, dairy, tea, or water in his diet. Buster smoked since he was seven-years-old and followed a diligent regimen of beer, cigarettes, and red meat. In 2008, Buster successfully finished the London Marathon. When Buster was not training for marathons, he cleaned vans for Pimlico Plumbers in southeast London. On April 12, 2011, Buster finished work, had a beer, and went home. He died that night, at age 104.

Jonathan Gold, a food critic who writes for LA Weekly, shares an Oki Dog and his philosophy of food with Wexler. Gold claims that "eating is one of the great pleasures of life", and believes that those with diet restrictions are missing out on a lot that life has to offer. He is the author of Counter Intelligence and has written for several magazines throughout his lifetime. In 2007, Gold became the first critic to win the Pulitzer Prize.

Dr. Madan Kataria gives viewers of the documentary a prescription for longevity: "Laugh ten minutes every day for no reason." Known as the "Guru of Giggling", Kataria researched the physiological and psychological benefits of laughter and started a Laughter Yoga club in 1995 with just five people in a public park in Mumbai. The unusual exercise routine combines yoga breathing with laughter exercises, and it has grown to more than 6,000 Laughter Yoga clubs in over 60 countries.

In the documentary, Eleanor Wasson reveals that being a vegetarian and drinking vodka every night are a few secrets to her 100-year lifespan. Throughout her life, Wasson was a volunteer, an activist, and a devotee to social and political causes of various kinds. She was the founder of WomenRise for Global Peace and had been a long-time fighter against the spread of nuclear weapons. For thirty years, Wasson was the Coordinator of Volunteer Services for UCLA. She died April 6, 2008.

Pico Iyer, a British-born novelist, essayist, and travel writer, also makes an appearance in the documentary. He regularly contributes to Time, National Geographic, and the New York Times on various subjects. Iyer is a close friend of the director and is, Wexler claims, "the sanest person I know." He turns the camera on Wexler, asking the director to examine his own hopes and intentions for making the documentary. He asserts that like the ending of books and films, "death makes sense of everything that comes before it."

The documentary, contrary to its title, is not a how-to guide to eternal life. Rather, it is an examination of different philosophies and perspectives on life, offering viewers a glimpse into the science and commercialism in fields like funeral planning, cryonics, and anti-aging practices. Meanwhile, the film challenges viewers to examine their own notions of whether to combat or accept the inevitability of aging; it is this dilemma that drives Wexler’s search both around the world and within himself, asking the question, "If you could take a pill to live 500 more years, would you?"

== Production ==
How to Live Forever premiered at the 17th Annual Hamptons International Film Festival in 2009. It was also screened at the Palm Springs International Film Festival in January 2011 and the Gasparilla International Film Festival in March 2011.

In addition to How to Live Forever, Mark Wexler directed Tell Them Who You Are (2004), about his father, cinematographer Haskell Wexler, and Me and My Matchmaker (1996). He also co-produced Air Force One (2002). Me and My Matchmaker won an Audience Award for Best Documentary at the 2006 Slamdance Film Festival.

Robert DeMaio, director of the 1983 TV series Against the Odds and writer of TV documentary Reversal of Fortune (2005), co-wrote Tell Them Who You Are and Me and My Matchmaker with Wexler. Mark Luethi is co-producer of How to Live Forever and associate producer of Tell Them Who You Are. Stephen Dypiangco, producer of marketing and distribution for 2011 Oscar-winner God of Love, is also producer of marketing and distribution for How to Live Forever.

== Featuring ==
The following people are featured in How to Live Forever :

- Dolores Bates
- Ray Bradbury
- Aubrey de Grey
- Brian M. Delaney
- Phyllis Diller
- Mordecai Finley
- Sebastien Gendry
- Jonathan Gold
- Rathyna Gomer
- Brian Harris
- Pico Iyer
- Marge Jetton
- Tanya Jones
- Madan Kataria
- Ronald Klatz
- Tricia Kurunathan
- Ray Kurzweil
- Elaine & Jack LaLanne
- Thomas Lynch
- Buster Martin
- Shinei Miyagi
- Kelly Morton
- Al Mott
- Samm Mullins
- Scott Mullins
- Zenei Nakamura
- Sherwin Nuland
- Ushi & Kikue Okushima
- Don & Edna Parker
- John Robbins
- Randall Roberts
- Linda Salvin
- Lisa Schoonerman
- Diana Schwarzbein
- Willard Scott
- Takanori Shibata
- Suzanne Somers
- Shigeo Tokuda
- Ellsworth Wareham
- Eleanor Wasson
- Craig Willcox
- Jessica L. Williams
- Marianne Williamson
- Tyrus Wong
- Heather Yegge
- Akimitsu Yokoyama
- Robert O. Young
