= Ellsworth Wareham =

American cardiothoracic surgeon

- Born: October 3, 1914; Texas
- Died: December 15, 2018 (aged 104); Loma Linda, California
- Occupation: Surgeon
- Known for: One of the earliest practitioners of open heart surgery
- Relatives: Dayton Wareham and Goldie nee Baldwin
- Medical career
- Field: Cardiothoracic surgery
- Institutions: Loma Linda University

Ellsworth Edwin Wareham (October 3, 1914 – December 15, 2018) was an American cardiothoracic surgeon and centenarian from Loma Linda, California who promoted the health benefits of plant-based nutrition.

== Biography ==
Wareham was born in Texas to farming parents Dayton Wareham (1892-1972) and Goldie née Baldwin (1890-1975), and grew up in Alberta, Canada. He was a Seventh-day Adventist and a World War II navy veteran. Wareham retired as a cardiothoracic surgeon at the age of 74 but continued to associate himself with training residents at the Loma Linda University until the age of 95, during which time he drove 60 miles (100 km) to assist in operations. He was one of the earliest practitioners of open heart surgery, soon after the first such procedure was performed. Leonard Bailey, the surgeon who transplanted a baboon heart into a baby at Loma Linda University in 1984, trained under Wareham as a medical student in the late 1960s. The child, Baby Fae, was born prematurely with hypoplastic left heart syndrome and Bailey's surgery made international headlines.

Wareham co-founded the Loma Linda University Overseas Heart Surgery Team which traveled the world performing open heart surgeries on adults and children in underdeveloped countries or those without cardiac surgery hospitals. One such trip was cut short when Saigon, South Vietnam fell in April 1975. Knowing the capture of Saigon by the People's Army of Vietnam and the National Liberation Front of South Vietnam was imminent, Wareham sent the rest of the team home to the United States while he remained behind to provide post-operative care to those who had just been operated upon. He escaped days before the final air evacuation of the U.S. Embassy. Wareham is believed to have performed the first open heart surgery in Pakistan in the early 1960s when he headed a good will mission sponsored by the U.S. Department of State. The charitable efforts of his team garnered praise from two U.S. Presidents (Johnson and Nixon), as well as the King of Greece and Saudi Arabian Royalty.

== Longevity ==
Loma Linda, Wareham's home town has been described as USA's only Blue Zone, an area where the longevity is appreciably higher than the national average and one of the four places in the world to have a substantial proportion of humans live past 100 years. The city has strict controls on the sale of alcohol, has a ban on smoking, and its largest supermarket does not sell meat. Wareham's video "Dr. Ellsworth Wareham's Secret for Staying Young" has been featured on AOL, and tv.com. Wareham appeared in How to Live Forever, a documentary film about longevity. He also presented talks on preventative medicine and what he believed constitute long healthy lives.

Wareham's daily routine included exercise such as mowing his lawn and walking and spending time with his family. He commented that "If your cholesterol is under 150, your chances of getting a heart attack are very low", he said his own cholesterol was 117.

=== Diet ===
In 2005, Wareham told Dan Buettner that "at middle age, I decided to become a vegan. With the exception of an occasional piece of fish, all I eat are plants". Wareham ate two large meals a day and preferred to drink water. He ate whole grain cereal with soy milk, fruit, toast with nut butter, and a handful of nuts for breakfast. His second meal consisted of beans, raw vegetables, cooked asparagus, broccoli and cabbage with dates and nuts for dessert. He stated that this diet was similar to what God prescribed for the Garden of Eden. He avoided refined sugar and rarely ate out at restaurants unless he was ordering salmon. In a 2009 interview, Wareham described himself as a vegetarian. In 2011, Wareham stated that he had been a vegan for 30 or 40 years but he did not remember the precise date.

== Death ==
Wareham died at home in Loma Linda, California on December 15, 2018. He was survived by his wife Barbara, his children; Martin, John, Robert, and Julie and eight grandchildren and six great-grandchildren.

== See also ==
- List of pescetarians
