= Daryl Hannah =

American actress and director (born 1960)

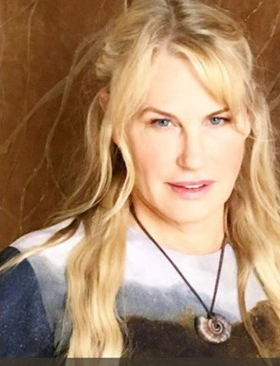
- Hannah in 2019
- Born: December 3, 1960 (age 65); Chicago, Illinois, U.S.
- Occupations: Actress; director; environmental activist
- Years active: 1978–present
- Spouse: Neil Young (m. 2018)
- Relatives: Page Hannah (sister); Tanya Wexler (half-sister)

Daryl Hannah (born December 3, 1960) is an American actress, director, and environmental activist. She has acted in comedic and dramatic roles in more than a hundred film and television productions since the 1970s.

Hannah has appeared in a number of successful action and thriller films. The supernatural The Fury (1978) began her career and she achieved fame with Blade Runner in 1982. Romantic comedies followed: Summer Lovers (1982), the fantasy comedy Splash (1984), Roxanne (1987), and High Spirits (1988).

Drama films have included Wall Street (1987), the comedy drama Steel Magnolias (1989), and the martial arts features Kill Bill: Volume 1 (2003) and Volume 2 (2004). On television, Hannah has starred in the Netflix series Sense8 (2015). Outside of acting, Hannah has directed and was nominated for the Grammy Award for Best Music Film. She is noted for her environmental and social activism.

== Early life ==
Hannah was born in Chicago, Illinois, to Susan Jeanne Metzger, a producer and former schoolteacher, and Donald Christian Hannah, a tugboat and barge company owner. Her parents divorced, and her mother married businessman Jerrold Wexler, brother of cinematographer Haskell Wexler. Hannah grew up with siblings Don and Page Hannah and her maternal half-sister, Tanya Wexler, in Long Grove, Illinois. She was raised Roman Catholic; her stepfather, Jerrold Wexler, was Jewish.

Hannah became interested in movies at a young age, partly due to insomnia. She has said that she was very shy growing up. As a young child, Hannah was emotionally isolated and struggled in school. She was diagnosed with autism, and medical professionals urged her parents to have her institutionalized and medicated. Instead, her mother decided to relocate with Hannah temporarily to Jamaica, in hopes that the change in environment would help her daughter. Hannah later attended the progressive Francis W. Parker School in Chicago before enrolling at the University of Southern California in Los Angeles, where she studied ballet and acting, majoring in theatre.

== Career ==
=== Film and television ===
Hannah made her film debut at age 17 in 1978 with an appearance in Brian De Palma's horror film The Fury. She had an early role along with Rachel Ward in the 1983 horror film The Final Terror. The film was shot in 1981 and released in 1983.

In 1982, Hannah played the acrobatic and violent replicant Pris in Ridley Scott's science fiction classic Blade Runner, in which she performed some of her own gymnastic stunts. That same year, she appeared in the summer hit release Summer Lovers. Her role as a mermaid in Ron Howard's hit fantasy/comedy Splash (1984), opposite Tom Hanks brought her much recognition. Also in 1984, she appeared in The Pope of Greenwich Village, co-starring with Mickey Rourke and Eric Roberts.

In 1985, Hannah appeared in and provided backing vocals in the music video "You're a Friend of Mine", performed by Clarence Clemons and Jackson Browne. She also appeared in the music video for Browne's "Tender Is the Night". Hannah's other 1980s roles included the film version of the best seller The Clan of the Cave Bear (1986) and Legal Eagles (1986) starring Robert Redford and Debra Winger. She appeared in the Academy Award-winning Wall Street (1987), for which she received a Razzie Award.

In 1987, Hannah starred in the title role of Fred Schepisi's film Roxanne, a modern retelling of Edmond Rostand's play Cyrano de Bergerac. Her performance was described as "sweet" and "gentle" by film critic Roger Ebert. She also starred in High Spirits (1988) opposite Peter O'Toole and ended the decade with Woody Allen's Crimes and Misdemeanors (1989) and Steel Magnolias featuring Sally Field, Shirley MacLaine, Julia Roberts, and Dolly Parton (1989).

In 1993, Hannah first played the daughter of Jack Lemmon's character in both of the Grumpy Old Men comedies. That same year, she played Nancy Archer in the HBO comedy remake of Attack Of The Fifty-Foot Woman. In 1995 she appeared as homicidal sociopath Leann Netherwood in The Tie That Binds. In 1998 she played the co-lead to Christopher Reeve in the made-for-television film remake Rear Window. That same year she also starred in the direct-to-video film Addams Family Reunion playing Morticia Addams.

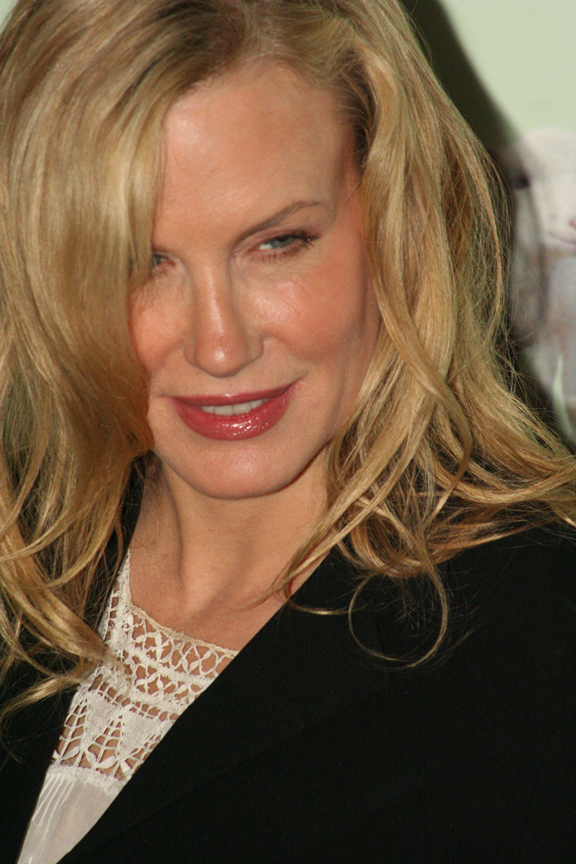
Daryl Hannah at the Farm Gala 2006

In 2003, Hannah played Elle Driver, a one-eyed assassin, in Kill Bill: Volume 1, directed by Quentin Tarantino. Her performance in this film and her appearances in Speedway Junky (1999), Dancing at the Blue Iguana (2000), A Walk to Remember (2002), Northfork (2003), Casa de los Babys (2003) and Silver City (2004), have been described by some reviewers as a comeback. After Kill Bill, she appeared in several TV films and miniseries, including the Syfy original film Shark Swarm, Final Days of Planet Earth for the Hallmark Channel, and Kung Fu Killer for Spike. She also appeared in Shannon's Rainbow and The Devil's ground also known as The Cycle in 2009.

In the 2010s, Hannah appeared in several films, including A Closed Book and Eldorado. Robert Koehler of Variety wrote of A Closed Book that it allows curious fans to see what Hannah has been up to lately. In 2013, she starred in Zombie Night, a Syfy original film by The Asylum as well as in TV movie Social Nightmare (a.k.a. Mother: She'll Keep You Safe), a thriller by The Asylum about internet bullying. In 2013, she joined Skin Traffik, and, in 2014, she signed on to Signs of Death.

Beginning in 2015, Hannah portrayed Angelica Turing in Sense8, a series on Netflix from the Wachowskis. The series ran for two seasons, with a final episode released on June 8, 2018. Also in 2018, Hannah released Paradox, for which she served as writer and producer; the film featured her husband, musician Neil Young.

In 2020, Hannah starred in The Now, a comedy series for The Roku Channel opposite Dave Franco.

In 2023 she was nominated for a Grammy Award for Best Music Film for Neil Young & Crazy Horse's "A Band A Brotherhood A Barn".

In 2025, Hannah directed the 2025 documentary film Coastal, a behind the scenes look at Neil Young's Coastal concert tour.

=== Theatre ===
Hannah is an accomplished theater actress, reprising Marilyn Monroe's starring role in The Seven Year Itch in 2000 in London's West End. Reviews of the play commended Hannah's performance, with Lizzie Loveridge of Curtain Up! saying that the play was the "perfect vehicle" for Hannah to "show her talents as a comedienne."

=== Other work ===
Hannah wrote, directed and produced a short film titled The Last Supper. She directed, produced, and was cinematographer for the documentary Strip Notes, which was broadcast on Channel 4 in the UK and on HBO and documented the research Hannah did for her role as a stripper in Dancing at the Blue Iguana.

In 2002, Hannah appeared in Robbie Williams' video for the song "Feel" portraying Williams' love interest.

Hannah and actress Hilary Shepard Turner created two board games, Love It or Hate It and LIEbrary. Hannah previewed the latter on The Ellen DeGeneres Show in 2005.

== Activism, legal issues ==
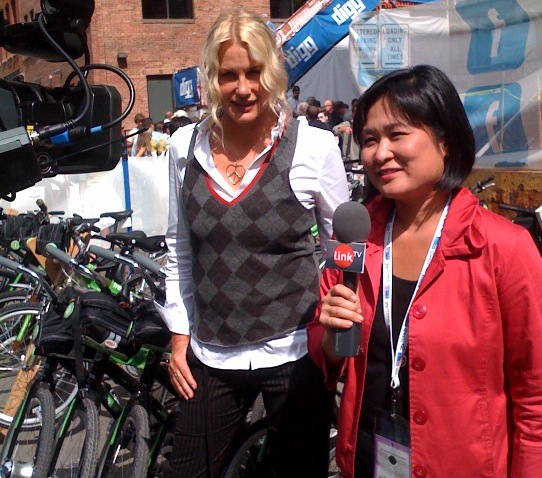
Hannah being interviewed by Link TV during the 2008 Democratic National Convention in Denver

Hannah, an active environmentalist, created her own weekly video blog called DHLoveLife on sustainable solutions. She is often the sound recordist, camera person and on-screen host for the blog. As of 2006, her home—which was built with green materials—ran on solar power, and she drove a car that ran on biodiesel. She has been vegetarian since age 11, and later became vegan. In late 2006, she volunteered to act as a judge for Treehugger.com's "Convenient Truths" contest. On December 4, 2008, Hannah joined Sea Shepherd Conservation Society's crew aboard the MY Steve Irwin as part of Operation Musashi.

On June 13, 2006, Hannah was arrested, along with actor Taran Noah Smith, for her involvement with over 350 farmers, their families and supporters, confronting authorities trying to bulldoze the largest urban farm in the U.S., located in South Central Los Angeles. She chained herself to a walnut tree at the South Central Farm for three weeks to protest against the farmers' eviction by the property's new owner, Ralph Horowitz. The farm had been established in the wake of the 1992 L.A. riots to allow people in the city to grow food for themselves. Horowitz, who had paid $5 million for it, sought to evict the farmers to build a warehouse. He had asked for $16 million to sell it but turned down the offer when the activists raised that amount after the established deadline. Hannah was interviewed via cell phone shortly before she was arrested, along with 44 other protesters, and said that she and the others were doing the "morally right thing". She was released from Century Regional Detention Center after several hours.

Hannah has worked to help end sexual slavery and has traveled around the world to make a documentary.

Hannah was among 31 people arrested on June 23, 2009, in a protest against mountaintop removal in southern West Virginia, part of a wider campaign to stop the practice in the region. The protesters, who included NASA climate scientist James E. Hansen, were charged with obstructing officers and impeding traffic after they sat in the middle of State Route 3 outside Massey Energy's Goals Coal preparation plant, The Charleston Gazette reported. In a Democracy Now! phone interview in June 2009, Hannah spoke briefly on why she went to West Virginia and risked arrest.

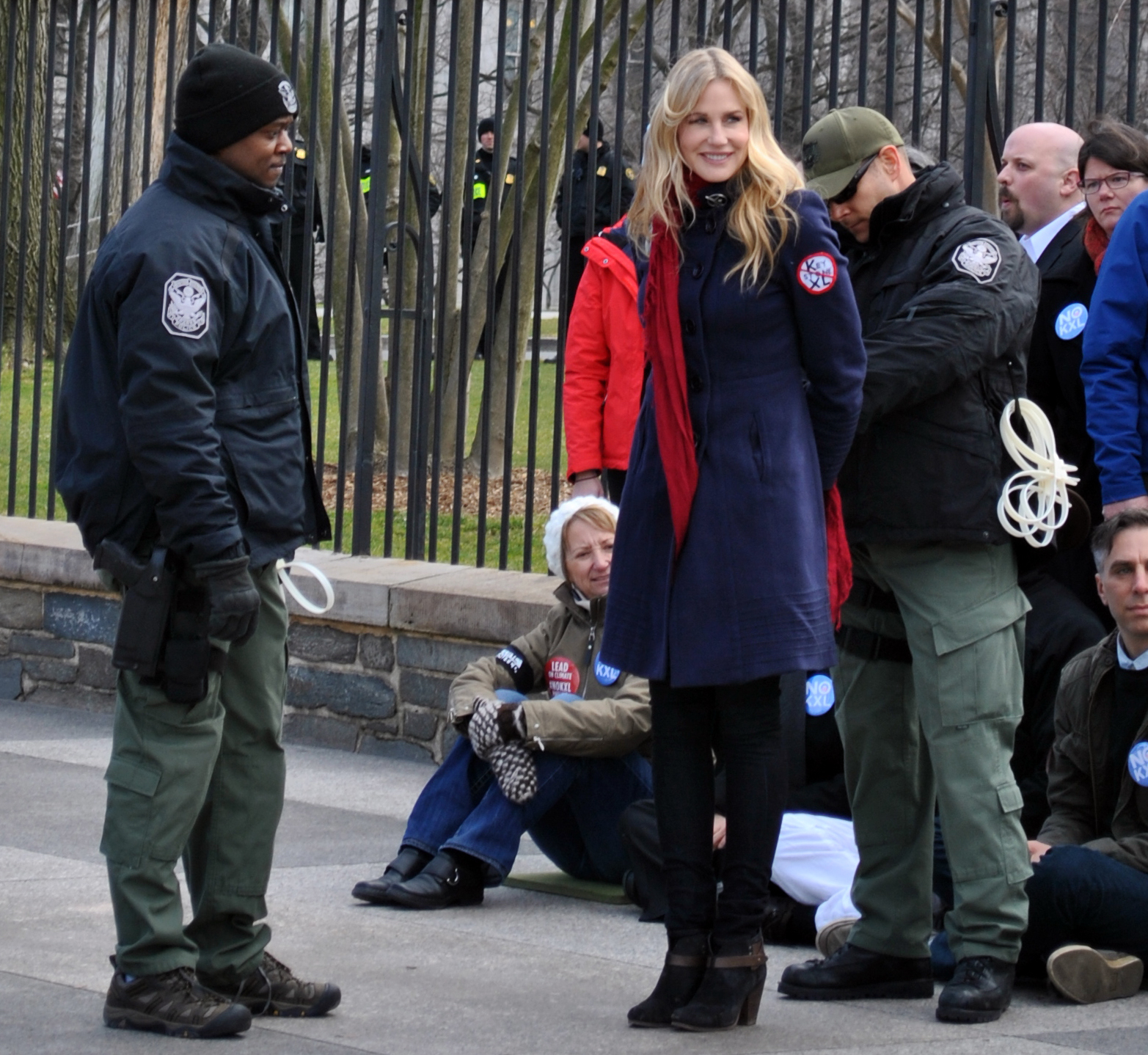
Hannah being arrested in Washington, D.C., while protesting the Keystone XL pipeline, 2013

Hannah was arrested on August 30, 2011, in front of the White House as part of a sit-in to protest against the proposed Keystone oil pipeline from Alberta to the U.S. Gulf Coast. In a Huffington Post piece co-authored with Phil Radford, Hannah explained that the purpose of her action was to "shine the light" on President Obama's decision on the pipeline for "millions of voters" to see. In October 2011, Hannah and other pipeline opponents rode horses and bicycles and walked from the Pine Ridge Indian Reservation to the Rosebud Reservation to protest the project.

Hannah was the executive producer of Greedy Lying Bastards, a 2012 documentary against climate change denial.

In September 2012, Hannah signed environmental activist Tom Weis' open letter calling on President Barack Obama and Governor Mitt Romney to withdraw their support for the construction of the southern leg of the Keystone XL pipeline, that would transport oil sands from Montana to Texas. Other signatories included climate scientist James Hansen and actors Sheryl Lee, Mariel Hemingway, and Ed Begley Jr.

In October 2012, Hannah was arrested and jailed in Wood County, Texas, for criminal trespassing. She and a local landowner, 78-year-old Eleanor Fairchild, were arrested while protesting against the TransCanada Keystone XL oil sands pipeline by attempting to block heavy construction equipment. Although they were charged with trespassing, they were in fact protesting on Fairchild's land.

On February 13, 2013, Hannah was arrested at the White House along with Robert F. Kennedy Jr. and Conor Kennedy during a climate change protest against the proposed Keystone Pipeline.

On April 26, 2014, in Washington, Hannah and Neil Young led a march by the "Cowboy and Indian Alliance" group against the Obama administration to reject the proposed Keystone Pipeline.

Hannah endorsed Senator Bernie Sanders for president in the 2016 U.S. presidential election.

She is a member of the World Future Council, and a patron of The Gorilla Organization, a UK-based charity working to protect mountain gorillas.

On March 2, 2025, she introduced herself at the 97th Academy Awards ceremony with the phrase "Slava Ukraini," proclaiming her support for the Ukrainian cause amid the Russo-Ukrainian War.

== Personal life ==
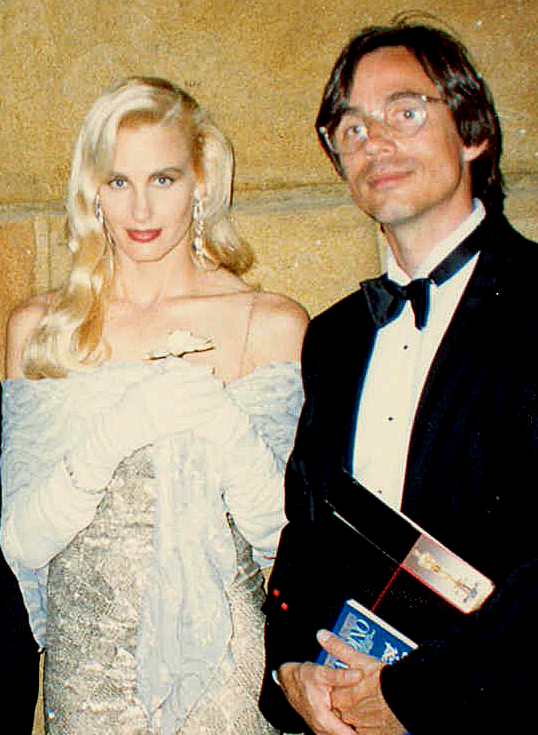
Hannah with Jackson Browne at the Academy Awards, 1988

Hannah had long-term relationships with John F. Kennedy Jr. and musician Jackson Browne. She and Browne began dating in 1983 and broke up in 1992 amid unsubstantiated rumors that Browne had been physically abusive to her. Browne prevailed in a defamation dispute with Fox Television, which issued a retraction. Hannah and Kennedy initially met in the 1980s. People Magazine claims they dated for more than five years, breaking up in 1994. She spoke negatively about her portrayal in the 2026 television series Love Story, stating, "The character 'Daryl Hannah' portrayed in the series is not even a remotely accurate representation of my life, my conduct or my relationship with John. The actions and behaviors attributed to me are untrue." Hannah began a relationship with musician Neil Young in 2014 and they married in 2018.

Hannah was among the numerous women who brought sexual abuse allegations against Harvey Weinstein. In a part of Ronan Farrow's 2017 exposé, Hannah claimed that Weinstein sexually harassed her multiple times during the production of Kill Bill and that he once tried to break into her hotel room. Fearing that he intended to rape her, she fled the room through a fire escape. Hannah later expressed belief that Weinstein sabotaged her career in retaliation for refusing his advances since she struggled to find acting work after appearing in Kill Bill.

== Filmography ==
=== Actress ===
==== Film ====
Year	Title	Role	Notes
1978	The Fury	Pam	
1981	Hard Country	Loretta	
1982	Blade Runner	Pris Stratton	
1982	Summer Lovers	Cathy Featherstone	
1983	The Final Terror	Windy Morgan	
1984	Reckless	Tracey Prescott	
1984	Splash	Madison	Saturn Award for Best Actress
1984	The Pope of Greenwich Village	Diane	
1986
1986	Legal Eagles	Chelsea Deardon	Also performance artist
1987	Roxanne	Roxanne Kowalski	
1987	Wall Street	Darien Taylor	Golden Raspberry Award for Worst Supporting Actress
1987	The Clan of the Cave Bear	Ayla	
1988	High Spirits	Mary Plunkett Brogan	Nominated—Golden Raspberry Award for Worst Supporting Actress
1989	Crimes and Misdemeanors	Lisa Crosley	Uncredited
1989	Steel Magnolias	Annelle Dupuy Desoto	
1990	Crazy People	Kathy Burgess	
1991	At Play in the Fields of the Lord	Andy Huben	
1992	Memoirs of an Invisible Man	Alice Monroe	
1993	Grumpy Old Men	Melanie Gustafson	
1994	The Little Rascals	Miss June Crabtree	
1995	The Tie That Binds	Leann Netherwood	
1995	Grumpier Old Men	Melanie Gustafson	
1996	Two Much	Liz Kerner	Nominated—Golden Raspberry Award for Worst Supporting Actress
1996	The Last Days of Frankie the Fly	Margaret	
1998	The Gingerbread Man	Lois Harlan	
1998	The Real Blonde	Kelly	
1998	Addams Family Reunion	Morticia Addams	Direct-to-video
1998	Hi-Life	Maggie	
1999	My Favorite Martian	Lizzie	
1999	Speedway Junky	Veronica	
1999	Diplomatic Siege	Erica Long	
2000	Cord	Anne White	Direct-to-video
2000	Hide and Seek	Anna	Direct-to-video
2000	Wildflowers	Sabine	
2001	Jackpot	Bobbi	
2001	Dancing at the Blue Iguana	Angel	
2001	Cowboy Up	Celia Jones	a.k.a. Ring of Fire
2002	A Walk to Remember	Cynthia Carter	
2002	Searching for Debra Winger	Herself	
2002	Hard Cash	Virginia	Direct-to-video
2003	Northfork	Flower Hercules	
2003	The Job	CJ March	
2003	Casa de los babys	Skipper	
2003	The Big Empty	Stella	
2003	Kill Bill: Volume 1	Elle Driver	
2004	Kill Bill: Volume 2	Elle Driver	Italian Online Movie Award for Best Cast; MTV Movie Award for Best Fight (with Uma Thurman); Saturn Award for Best Supporting Actress; Nominated—Satellite Award for Best Supporting Actress – Motion Picture
2004	Kill Bill: The Whole Bloody Affair	Elle Driver	
2004	Silver City	Maddy Pilager	
2004	Whore	Adriana	
2004	Careful What You Wish For	Store Patron	Short film
2006	Love Is the Drug	Sandra Brand	
2006	Keeping Up with the Steins	Sacred Feather / Sandy	
2006	Olé	Maggie Granger	
2007	The Poet	Marlene Konig	
2007	Cosmic Radio	Herself	Cameo
2008	Vice	Salt	
2008	The Garden	Herself	
2008	Dark Honeymoon	Jan	
2009	The Cycle	Carrie	a.k.a. The Devil's Ground
2009	Shannon's Rainbow	Dr. Rita Baker	
2010	A Closed Book	Jane Ryder	Bahamas Film Award for Best Actress
2011	Every Generation Needs a Revolution	Herself	Short film
2011	A Fonder Heart	Margaret Boone	
2011	Lovemakers	Mimi	
2012	Eldorado	The Stranger	
2013	Garbage	Herself	
2013	The Hot Flashes	Ginger Peabody	
2014	2047: Sights of Death	Major Anderson	
2014	Father Rupert Mayer	Joanna Sebastian	
2015	I Am Michael	Deborah	
2015	Skin Traffik	Zhanna	
2015	Awaken	Mao	
2015	Sicilian Vampire	Carmelina Trafficante	
2017	The Slider	Carol	
2018	Papa	Sarah Freidman	
2019	The Sound of a Wild Snail Eating	Narrator	Short film
2019	Undateable John	Rose	
2021	The American Connection	Flora	
2023	Buckle Up	Angel	

==== Television ====
Year	Title	Role	Notes
1982	Paper Dolls	Taryn Blake	Television film
1993	Attack of the 50 Ft. Woman	Nancy Archer	Television film
1997	The Last Don	Athena Aquitane	2 episodes
1997	Gun	Jill Johnson	Episode: "All the President's Women"
1997	Muppets Tonight	Herself	1 episode
1998	Rear Window	Claudia Henderson	Television film
1998	Rescuers: Stories of Courage: Two Families	Maria Althoff	Television film
2000	First Target	Alex McGregor	Television film
2001	Jack and the Beanstalk: The Real Story	Thespee	2 episodes
2002	Frasier	Caller #2 (voice)	Episode: "Frasier Has Spokane"
2006	Final Days of Planet Earth	Liz Quinlan	2 episodes
2007	All the Good Ones Are Married	Alex	Television film
2008	Storm Seekers	Leah Kaplan	Television film
2008	Kung Fu Killer	Jane	2 episodes
2008	Shark Swarm	Brooke Wilder	Television film
2013	Social Nightmare	Susan Hardy	Television film
2013	Zombie Night	Birdy	Television film
2013–2014	Hawaii Five-0	Cherie Tranton	2 episodes
2015–2018	Sense8	Angelica Turing	17 episodes
2021	The Now	Maxine Poole	11 episodes

=== Director ===
Year	Title	Notes
1993	The Last Supper	Also writer and co-producer
2001	Strip Notes	Documentary
2018	Paradox	Also screenwriter
2019	Mountaintop	Documentary
2022	Barn (A Band, A Brotherhood, A Barn)	Documentary
2025	Coastal	Documentary

=== Theatre ===
Year	Title	Role	Notes
2000	The Seven Year Itch	The Girl	Made famous by Marilyn Monroe. Helped Hannah overcome stage fright.

=== Music Videos ===
Year	Title	Artist	Role
1983	" Tender Is the Night"	Jackson Browne	Woman
1985	"You're a Friend of Mine"	Clarence Clemons and Jackson Browne	Background Singer/Painter/Photographer
2002	"Feel"	Robbie Williams	Love interest

== Awards ==
- Best Actress—Saturn Award Splash, 1984
- Best Supporting Actress—Saturn Award Kill Bill: Volume 2, 2004
- Influencer of the Year Award—National Biodiesel Board, 2004
- Ongoing Commitment Award—Environmental Media Award, 2004
- Best Fight—MTV Movie Awards Kill Bill: Volume 2, 2005
- Environmental Activism – Water Quality Awards, 2006
- Environmental Preservation – Artivist Awards, 2006
- Special golden camera 300 – Manaki Brothers Film Festival, 2010
- Grammy - Best Music Film for "A Band a Brotherhood a Barn", 2023 (nominated)
