= Peter Bynoe =

American lawyer and businessman (born 1951)

- Born: March 20, 1951 (age 75); Boston, Massachusetts, US
- Education: J.D., Harvard Law School; M.B.A., Harvard Business School; B.A., Harvard College
- Occupations: Lawyer, businessman
- Employer: Rewards Network
- Title: CEO
- Board member of: Frontier Communications; Covanta; Signature Group Holdings
- Spouse: Linda Jean Walker (m. 1987)

Peter Charles Bernard Bynoe (born March 20, 1951) is a Chicago attorney and businessman, formerly the only African-American equity partner in the Chicago office of DLA Piper. In 1989, he and his business partner Bertram Lee were the first African-Americans to buy a controlling interest in a National Basketball Association (NBA) team, when they purchased a 37.5% share of the Denver Nuggets basketball team, and he is among the most influential minority figures in sports law and management.

Bynoe kept the Chicago White Sox from leaving Chicago by developing a New Comiskey Park (now known as Rate Field). He has become a negotiator for professional sports teams' venues. In addition, he was involved in the development of the 1996 and 2012 Summer Olympics. Bynoe serves on several boards of directors.

== Personal background ==
Born in Boston, Massachusetts, Bynoe came from a well-respected family. His father Victor C. Bynoe, had emigrated from his native Barbados at age 13, and after graduating from Northeastern University with degrees in Civil Engineering and Law, became a successful attorney. (At one point, he represented Boston Celtics star Bill Russell.) At a time when few blacks were being promoted to important positions in government, Victor Bynoe was named to Boston Mayor John B. Hynes' cabinet in 1950, serving on the Street Commission. He later became commissioner of Veterans' Services in Boston, and served on the board of the Boston Housing Authority. Peter's mother Ethel was American; she was praised by the black newspapers for her community involvement and volunteerism. Peter also had an uncle John Bynoe, who was active in the fight for civil rights, serving as the regional civil rights director for the United States Department of Health, Education and Welfare.

Bynoe attended William Lloyd Garrison Elementary School, and graduated from Boston Latin School in 1968. He credited his parents with instilling high standards and expecting him to achieve in school. He also had a love of sports, growing up as a regular Boston Celtics and Boston Red Sox fan; but although both teams had black players, racial relations in Boston at that time were still tense, and black fans like Bynoe were hesitant to attend the games.

Bynoe's entire post-secondary education was at Harvard University in Cambridge, Massachusetts. He obtained his bachelor's degree cum laude at Harvard College in 1972. He then received his master's degree, an M.B.A. in 1976, with an emphasis on finance and marketing, from Harvard Business School. His Juris Doctor from Harvard Law School had a focus on corporate planning and regulation. In addition to being admitted to the practice of law before the Illinois State Bar, Bynoe is a licensed real estate broker in Illinois.

In late November 1987, he married Linda Jean Walker, who was then vice-president of the fixed-income division of Morgan Stanley in New York.

== Business career ==
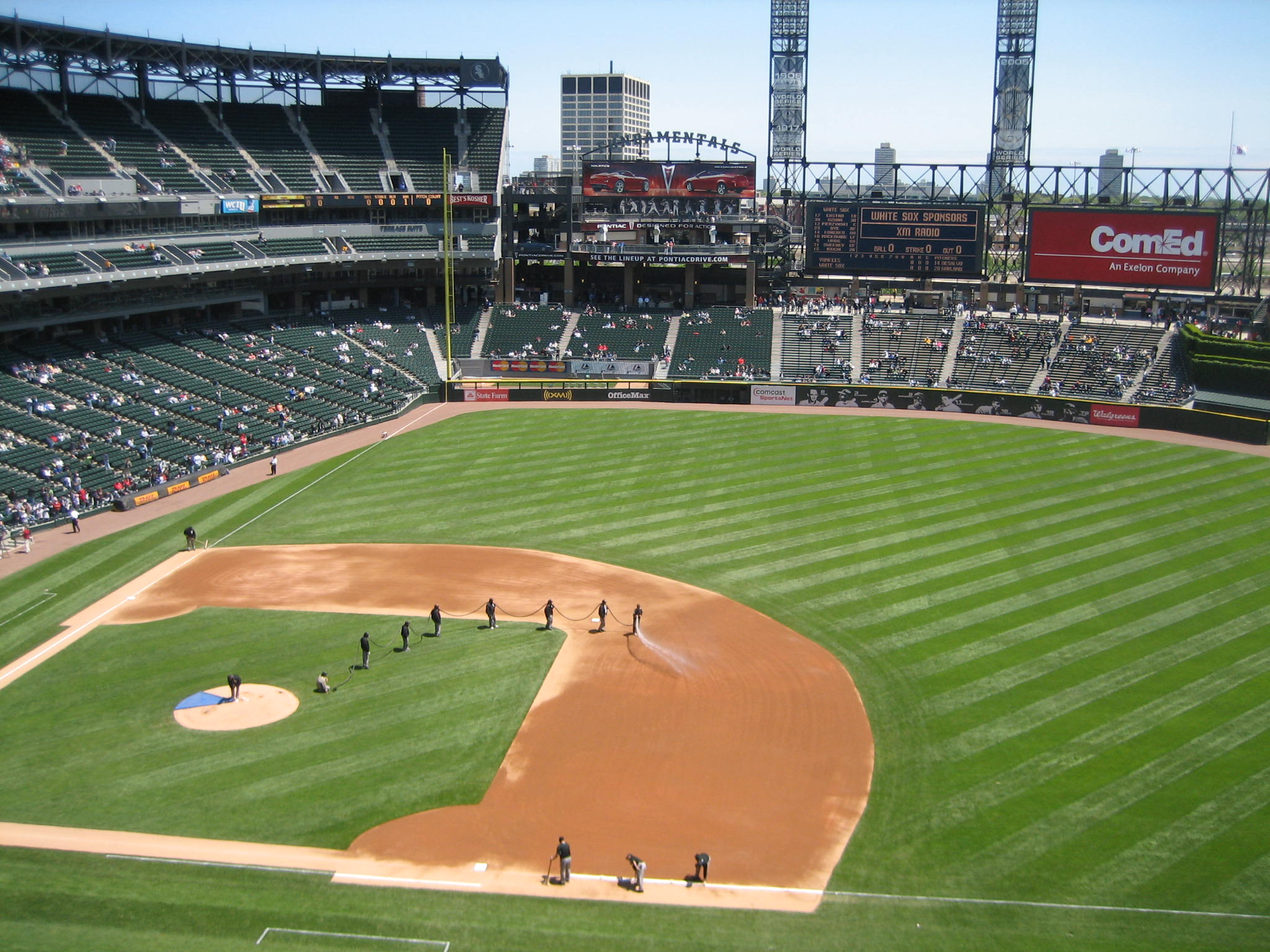
Bynoe oversaw the development of U.S. Cellular Field to keep the Chicago White Sox from leaving Chicago.

Bynoe began his professional career in 1976 at Citibank. After deciding he didn't like working for a large corporation, he left New York and moved to Chicago in 1977. He was hired by James Lowry, a management consultant whom he had met at Harvard. While with Lowry's firm, Bynoe made a name for himself as someone who could break down racial barriers and get diverse groups to work together. He also became known for his work in minority business development. By 1982, Bynoe passed the Illinois bar examination. He left Lowry and Associates in 1982, at which time he founded and managed Telemat Ltd., a business consulting firm.

His career path changed in 1987 when Harold Washington, whose election campaign he had worked for and contributed to, called Bynoe to inform him that the Chicago White Sox were threatening to leave Chicago. From January 1988 to June 1992, Bynoe served as the executive director of the Illinois Sports Facilities Authority, a joint venture of the City of Chicago and State of Illinois, which gave him complete supervisory, planning and executing responsibility for the $250 million construction of New Comiskey Park for the Chicago White Sox, which was completed as scheduled and well within its budget. He also became known in Chicago for his business relationships with such influential sports stars as Michael Jordan, a former client with whom he remained friends.

In November 1989, Bynoe and Bertram Lee purchased the Denver Nuggets. Lee and Bynoe had worked together in Boston years earlier, and Bynoe thought of Lee as a mentor. They had kept in touch, and were involved in several real estate dealings together. But the Nuggets deal was problematic from the start. In fact, it almost fell through because Lee did not have the resources everyone, Bynoe among them, thought he had. Media reports depicted Lee as a wealthy and successful businessman who was a financier with offices in two cities, and formerly part owner of Boston's WNEV-TV. But Lee and Bynoe were unable to meet the deadline to purchase the team from then-owner Sidney Shlenker. It would later be revealed that Lee had problems raising the needed capital. It was Bynoe, with the assistance of David Stern, Jay Pritzker, and Jerrold Wexler, who salvaged the transaction over the course of six months. The mainstream media reported that Lee and Bynoe were now the first two blacks to own a major sports team, but several of the black newspapers pointed out that the two men were actually managing general partners rather than owners, because the revised agreement to purchase the team meant they owned only a 37.5% stake in the team. Bynoe sold his interest in the franchise in August 1992. Communications Satellite Corporation's (COMSAT) Video Enterprises subsidiary put up 62.5% of the $65 million needed to purchase the Nuggets.

Bynoe was hired in 2008 by Chicago-based Loop Capital Markets LLC. Bynoe serves as managing director of Corporate Finance.

In August 2013, Bynoe left his executive role at Loop Capital Markets LLC to become CEO of Rewards Network, a company controlled by investor Sam Zell that offers loyalty programs for restaurants.

Bynoe now serves as a senior advisor to DLA Piper, and is the head lawyer for WWE.

== Other achievements ==
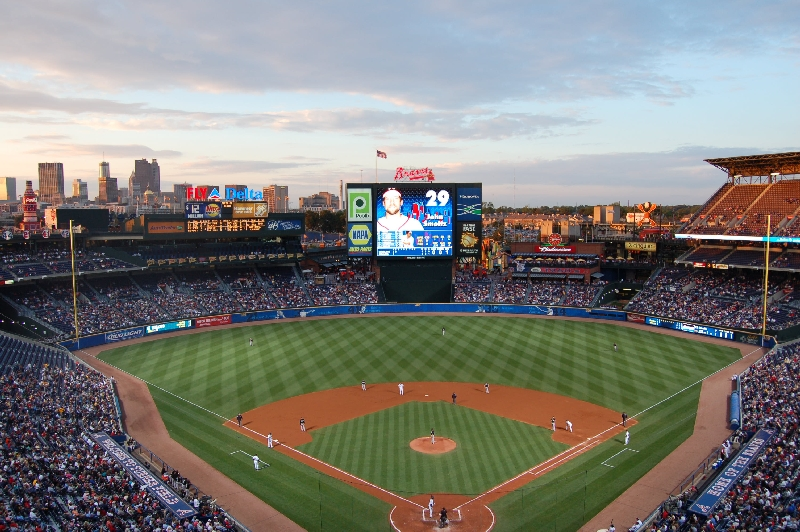
Bynoe consulted on the development of Centennial Olympic Stadium, which eventually was converted into Turner Field, shown here.

Bynoe served as a consultant to the Atlanta-Fulton County Recreation Authority and the Atlanta Committee to Organize the Olympic Games to plan the 85,000 seat Centennial Olympic Stadium within a $210 million construction budget. The stadium has been converted to the 45,000 seat Turner Field baseball stadium for the Atlanta Braves who use it under a lease agreement Bynoe negotiated. Bynoe became a partner at DLA Piper Rudnick Gray Cary LLP (US) in 1995 when he joined the firm and remains a member of the firm's executive committee. Bynoe as head of DLA Piper's Sports Facilities Practice Group negotiated new facilities for the Cincinnati Reds and Bengals, Miami Heat, Washington Redskins, Milwaukee Brewers, and Columbus Blue Jackets. He specialized in infrastructure projects and represented institutional clients such as: The Boeing Company, Sara Lee Corporation, Essence Communications, and CNA Insurance. Bynoe also was involved in the 2012 Summer Olympics, and was a backer of Barack Obama.

In addition, Bynoe is a Director of Frontier Communications Corporation, Covanta, and Signature Group Holdings, Inc. He is a Trustee of the Goodman Theatre, the Rush University Medical Center and The CORE Center for the Research and Cure of Infectious Diseases. He formerly served as Chairman of the Chicago Plan Commission Chicago Plan Commission, the Chicago Landmarks Commission Chicago Commission Landmarks, and the Illinois Sports Facilities Authority, and was a director of Jacor Communications and Blue Chip Broadcasting. Bynoe has been a director of Covanta since 2004. In 2007, Bynoe was announced as a director for Citizens Communications (which later changed its name to Frontier Communications). In the past, Bynoe has been a member of the Harvard Board of Overseers. He has also served as a director for Uniroyal Technology Corporation, Jacor Communications (acquired by Clear Channel Communications), J&G Industries, Huffman-Koos, Inc., the River Valley Savings Bank, and Blue Chip Broadcasting (acquired by Radio One, Inc).

== Honors ==
Bynoe has been designated an Illinois "Super Lawyer" for 2005 and 2006 based on research jointly conducted by Law & Politics and Chicago magazines.
