= Buster Martin =

British marathon runner (1906–2011)

- Born: 1 September 1906 (or 1913; disputed); Basque Country, France
- Died: 13 April 2011 (104 or 97); London, England, UK
- Occupations: Van cleaner columnist (FHM)
- Known for: Claimed oldest employee in the United Kingdom

Pierre Jean "Buster" Martin (1 September 1906/1913 – 13 April 2011) claimed to be the United Kingdom's oldest employee, stating that he was born in 1906. Until his death, he worked for Pimlico Plumbers, a plumbing company in southeast London, as a van cleaner, and refused to take a day off on the day he celebrated what he claimed was his 100th birthday. He also received coverage in the media for reportedly fending off an attack from a group of youths in 2007; he was cited by the former Liberal Democrat leader Sir Menzies Campbell as "living proof of why people should not be written off once they pass retirement age". Martin stated that he would not retire from working.

Doubts have been raised about all of Martin's historical claims, including his age, which may have in truth been 97 at the time of his death, as well as his purported marriage and family.

== Biography ==
In an interview with The Guardian newspaper, Martin claimed to have been born "up in the hills of the Basque Country" in France. He stated that his mother fell pregnant to a member of the affluent family she served, and he and his mother were smuggled to Britain to avoid the disgrace. His mother was put in a convent and he was placed in an orphanage near Bodmin in Cornwall, run by the Sisters of Mercy, when he was three months old. Martin says that he picked up his nickname "Buster" at age three for "whacking a priest on the nose".

He reputedly met his future wife, Iriana, a native of Tonbridge, Kent, when he was 13 and she was 12. He claimed that they were married a year later in France. Martin stated: "I got married in 1920 and had to go over to France as I couldn't get married here due to my legal status." However, the legal age for contracting marriage in France at the time was 18 for a boy and 15 for a girl, with the consent of their parents, or 21 without the consent of father and mother. The couple stayed together for 35 years until Iriana reportedly died in 1955, although no death certificate has been uncovered. They reportedly had 17 children, born between 1921 and 1934: "twins, triplets, singletons - all sorts", among them Roberto, Rodrigues, and triplets named Georgina, Georgia and Giselle, but again no record of their births could be found. Martin claimed that they all moved abroad.

He claimed to have left Brixton market aged 14, and joined the British Army, where he became a physical training instructor. He served in World War II, leaving the Armed Forces in 1955 after reaching the rank of regimental sergeant major. After time spent in various other jobs, he returned to the market, where he worked until he was 97. After complaining of boredom, he resumed work, starting at Pimlico Plumbers in London working three days a week, three months before his claimed 100th birthday.

On Martin's claimed centenary, his employer suggested that he take the day off to celebrate. However, he turned up for work. His colleagues threw him a surprise party at the company's headquarters and organized a tour of Chelsea F.C.'s Stamford Bridge ground. Until 2006, Martin claimed never to have taken a day off for sickness in his ninety years of work, until an ingrown toenail forced him to take a few months' leave of work.

Martin stated that he would "only give up [working] when they put me in a wooden box". He also offered his view on older workers: "Employers should pick people like us; we want to work and it puts money in our pockets and keeps us active". His boss, Charlie Mullins, stated in an interview with a French TV station that they use Buster in all their publicity and managed to increase their business by 36% thanks to his popularity and the media interest.

Martin died on 13 April 2011 at the claimed age of 104.

== The Zimmers ==
Through the intervention of celebrity publicist Max Clifford, Martin joined The Zimmers, a band consisting of forty old age pensioners. The group was put together by BBC film maker Tim Samuels for a documentary on the marginalisation of older people in Britain. The Zimmers shot to fame in 2007 with their cover of The Who's "My Generation". Martin also accepted a position on men's magazine FHM as an "agony uncle," offering advice to the magazine's readers.

== London Marathon 2008 ==
After walking the 10 kilometres (6.2 mi) distance of the Great Capital Run in 2 hours 22 minutes and the Roding Valley Half Marathon in 5 hours 13 minutes, Martin was entered for the 2008 London Marathon. According to press reports, he walked the 26-mile course in approximately 10 hours. The official London Marathon 2008 Results list shows intermediate results for 5 km, 10 km and 15 km but no finishing time for Martin's race number of 32858. His four minders - Harmander Singh (32857), Samm Mullins (32856), Anil K Gupta (51611) and Mirmal Singh Lotay (23984) - are officially listed with a finishing time of 9 hours 59 minutes.

If the claims about his age were true, he would have been the oldest recorded marathon participant in the world. However, officials of the Guinness World Records organisation said that they did not consider Martin eligible for the record because he had never provided proof of the date of his birth. Robert Young, an independent senior consultant for gerontology for Guinness World Records stated that his sources had told him that Martin had two birth dates registered with the British NHS: 1 September 1906, and 1 September 1913, the latter of which would have made him 94 years old at the time.

London bookmakers William Hill refused to pay out £13,300 in alleged winnings for two bets which had been placed on Martin's marathon efforts and would have benefitted the Rhys Daniels Trust. The bookmakers demand a birth certificate as proof of age, stating that other documents like a passport or a naturalisation certificate are only "proof of nationality" and, in this case, based on "self-certification". The Los Angeles Times reported on 12 April 2008 that Martin "follows a diligent regimen of beer, cigarettes and red meat".
