= The Zimmers =

English rock band

- Origin: United Kingdom
- Genres: Rock
- Years active: 2007–2010s
- Label: unsigned
- Members: See Members
- Website: Official website

The Zimmers are an English band formed in 2007 and are thought to have the oldest members of any group in the world. The oldest member, Buster Martin, claimed to have been born in 1906, although some sources indicate he was born in 1913. Martin died in 2011. Former lead singer Alf Carretta died on 29 June 2010, aged 93. The group takes its name from the Zimmer frame, the UK term for a mobility aid known in other countries as a walker.

The band was created as a feature in a BBC Television documentary called Power to the People - The Great Granny Chart Invasion, which aired on 28 May 2007. The feature of forming the band and recording a single was intended to give a voice to the feelings of isolation suffered by the elderly. The Zimmers' logo is a parody of The Beatles' logo, as is the image of them walking across Abbey Road.

In 2010, the group were invited to Los Angeles to perform in front of 3,500 people in organisations dealing with older people in America. They also appeared in a documentary in South Korea to encourage more of their older population to be more active. During part of this time the group were led by the main singer, John Langridge.

On 7 April 2012, the band performed the Beastie Boys' "(You Gotta) Fight for Your Right (To Party!)" on Britain's Got Talent. The band toured in 2013, performing in Warrington on 25 May that year. They also appeared at the Roundhouse Theatre.

The band were the oldest group, by average age, to chart a Top 40 single in the UK until the Rolling Stones entered the chart with "Angry" in September 2023, giving them an average combined age of 78.67 to the Zimmers' reported age of 78.

== Discography ==
The Zimmers released their first single, a cover of The Who's "My Generation", reaching number 26 in the UK Singles Chart, on 28 May 2007. The song was produced by Mike Hedges, the video shot by Geoff Wonfor, and it was recorded in the Beatles Studio 2 at Abbey Road.

On the 13 July 2007 broadcast of the Richard & Judy show, The Zimmers announced their cover of The Prodigy's "Firestarter". In September 2008, the band released their first album Lust for Life, which featured versions of songs by Eric Clapton, The Beatles and Frank Sinatra.

== BBC documentary ==
Documentary-maker Tim Samuels travelled Britain, investigating the feelings of isolation and imprisonment suffered by the country's elderly, as part of the BBC's Power to the People series. Samuels recruits pensioners otherwise stuck in institutions and towerblocks, and they air their grievances, culminating in the recording of the group's first single, where the group "sticks it back to the society that has cast them aside".

== Britain's Got Talent ==
15 members of the band, aged 66 to 88, appeared on Britain's Got Talent on 7 April 2012, performing the Beastie Boys' track "(You Gotta) Fight for Your Right (To Party!)". They walked on stage with thick coats and anoraks. Their oldest member, 88-year-old Grace Cooke, started the audition by singing a slow version of "What the World Needs Now". They all then removed their coats, revealing ostentatious jewellery (described as 'bling' by one of the judges) and hoodies and began to sing the Beasties track. They received four yes votes and survived through the live semi-finals.

In the semi-finals The Zimmers again performed a pop song; LMFAO's "Sexy and I Know It". They did not get to the finals.

== Members ==
- Frank Armstrong
- Sylvia Beaton
- Jack Beers (died aged 98, on 14 July 2009)
- Joan Bennett (deceased)
- Peggy Bohan (deceased)
- Joan Bonham (died on 10 February 2011, mother of John Bonham)
- Evelyn Brierley
- Raffaele "Alf" Carretta (died aged 93, on 29 June 2010)
- Peter Comerford (deceased)
- Grace Cook, grandmother of Dexter Fletcher
- Charlotte Cox (deceased)
- Peggy Crowley (deceased)
- Deddie Davies (died aged 78, on 21 December 2016)
- Adrian Derrick
- Rose Dickens (deceased)
- Tim Donovan (deceased)
- Marie Duckett
- Annetta Falco
- Patsey Feeley (deceased)
- Kathleen Fowler (deceased)
- Rob Fulford (deceased)
- Mollie P Hardie (died aged 87, on January 26, 2023).
- David Hardie (died aged 80, on 4 August 2015)
- Maura Haughey (died aged 83, on April 17 2025)
- Joanna Judge (deceased)
- John Langridge
- John Leonard
- Dolceta Llewellyn-Bowden (deceased)
- Avis Lewinson (deceased)
- Ivy Lock (deceased)
- Buster Martin (deceased 2011)
- Anne Morrissey
- Delores Murray
- Frank Morrissey (deceased)
- Peter Oakley (died aged 86, on 23 March 2014)
- Tim O'Donovan (deceased)
- Sally Page (deceased)
- Nadine Richardson (deceased)
- Rita Roberts (deceased)
- Bill Russell (deceased)
- Irene Samain (deceased)
- Gwen Sewell (deceased)
- Anne Sherwin (deceased)
- Dennis Skillicorn (died aged 85, on 21 December 2017)
- Jessie Thomason (deceased)
- Dorothy "Bubbles" Tree
- John Tree (deceased)
- Winifred Warburton (died aged 101, on 31 December 2008)
- Paddy Ward (deceased)
- Norma Walker (deceased)
- Eric Whitty (deceased)
