= Jerrold Wexler =

American businessman

- Born: June 27, 1924; Chicago, Illinois, U.S.
- Died: November 10, 1992 (aged 68); Palo Alto, California, U.S.
- Education: Northwestern University (BA)
- Occupation: Businessman
- Spouses: Lolly Lurie (m. 1946; div. 1968) Susan Jeanne Metzger (m. 1969)
- Children: 5, including Tanya
- Relatives: Haskell Wexler (brother); Jeff Wexler (nephew); Mark Wexler (nephew)

Jerrold Wexler (June 27, 1924 – November 10, 1992) was a noted American businessman and film producer. He was the brother of cinematographer Haskell Wexler and the stepfather of actress Daryl Hannah.

== Early life and education ==
Wexler was born to a Jewish family in Chicago, the son of Lottie and Simon Wexler. His brothers were Haskell Wexler, Yale Wexler, and his sister was Joyce Wexler Isaacs. He attended Northwestern University. His father founded the Columbia Radio Corporation in 1921 and the Allied Radio Corporation in 1928. Allied Radio was an American radio manufacturer and retailer, which sold radio sets, tubes, capacitors, amateur radio equipment, citizen's band (CB) radios, and consumer audio systems through retail stores and beginning in 1962, also via mail-order. In 1970, Allied Radio was purchased by the Tandy Corporation, the parent company of Radio Shack. His brother was cinematographer, film producer, and director Haskell Wexler.

== Business ventures ==
By his early 30s, he was building a reputation for financing monumental skyscrapers, including 400 East Randolph, a luxury apartment building in Chicago's Loop. With his father's help, he brokered the construction of the Executive Plaza Hotel on Wacker Drive (now known as Hotel 71).

In 1979 he, along with his business partner Edward W. Ross, purchased the Drake Hotel. The Drake was successfully nominated for the National Register of Historic Places in 1980. In 1983, Wexler's Jupiter Industries, which had interests in the Playboy Building, Lake Point Tower, Michigan Avenue real estate, dozens of Chicago hotels, and property holdings in both New York City and Los Angeles, saved Goldblatt's from bankruptcy. Jupiter also developed the Vista International Hotel at the World Trade Center, later known as the Marriott World Trade Center, which was destroyed in the September 11, 2001 attacks. He was known for pioneering new development areas; the Executive Plaza was the first hotel in Chicago in decades, and the Vista was the first hotel in downtown Manhattan for decades. He also built the Outer Drive East development in Chicago, which expanded the downtown into an industrial and shipping area in decline.

When Bertram Lee failed to come up with his ten percent share to purchase the National Basketball Association Denver Nuggets in 1989, Peter Bynoe recruited Jerrold Wexler and Jay Pritzker to keep the deal alive. The group held an interest in the team until 1992 when COMSAT bought out Drexel Burnham Lambert, Bynoe and his partners. In addition to his business interests, he was a very active political contributor. In addition, he served on the board of trustees of the John Austin Cheley Foundation.

== Personal life ==
In 1946, Wexler married Lolly Lurie; they had four children: Susan Wexler Piser; Jane Wexler Feil; Diane Wexler Grant; and Judith Wexler Gigliotti. They divorced in 1968. In 1969, he married Susan Jeanne Metzger, with whom he had one child: film director Tanya Wexler. He has three stepchildren from his marriage to Metzger: actress Daryl Hannah, Donald Hannah, and actress Page Hannah Adler.

== Death and legacy ==
In November 1992, Wexler died of lymphoma at the Stanford Hospital in Palo Alto, California. In 1993, he was inducted posthumously into the Chicago Association of REALTORS Hall of Fame.

His estate continued to sell off his business interests for several years after his death.

In 2003, the United States National Film Preservation Board added the 1969 film Medium Cool, co-produced by Jerrold and Haskell Wexler, to the National Film Registry.
