= List of pescetarians =

Pescetarians (also known as pescatarians) are people who adhere to a pescetarian diet that incorporates seafood as the only source of meat in an otherwise vegetarian diet. The following people are recognized as notable pescetarians, either currently or historically.

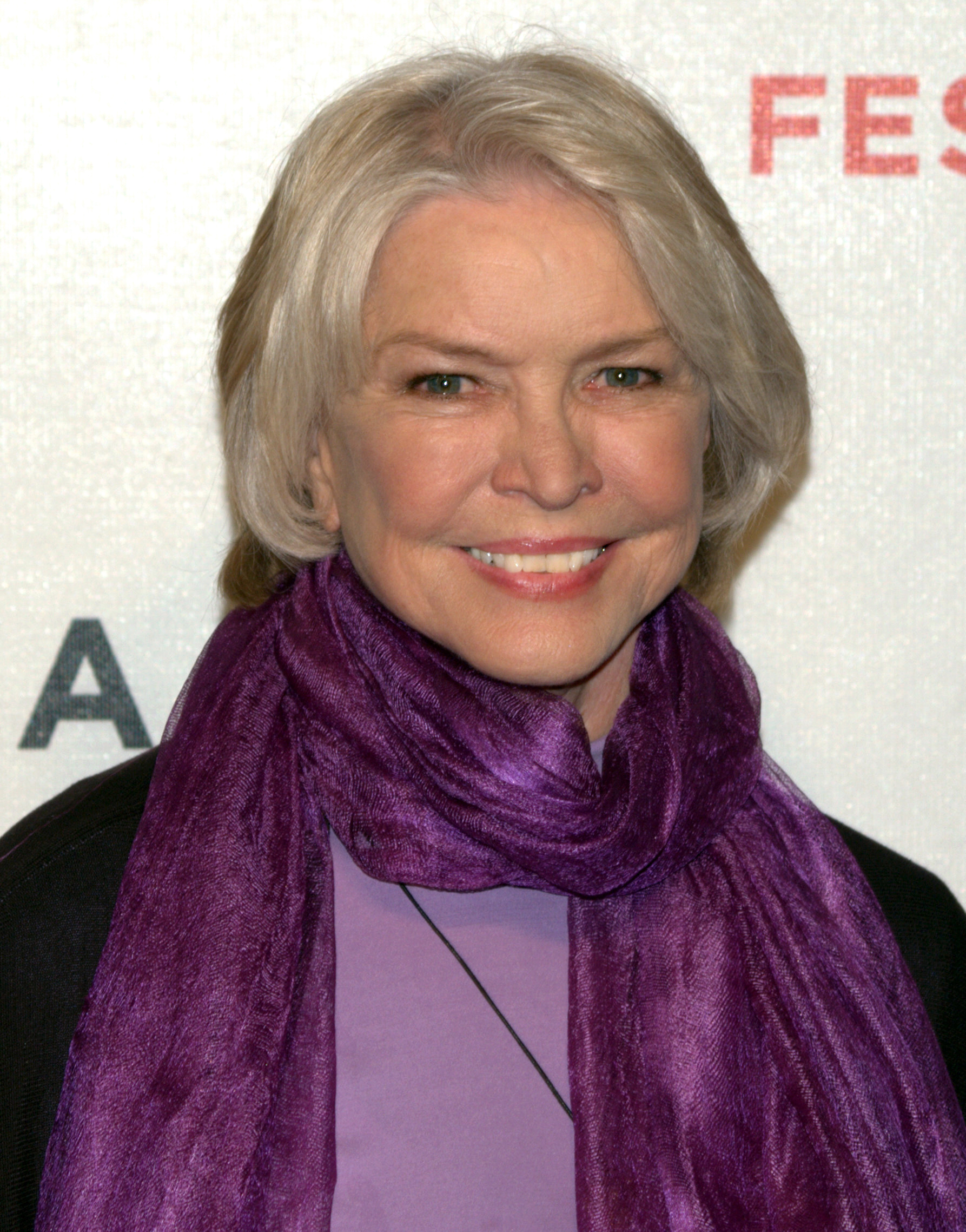
Ellen Burstyn

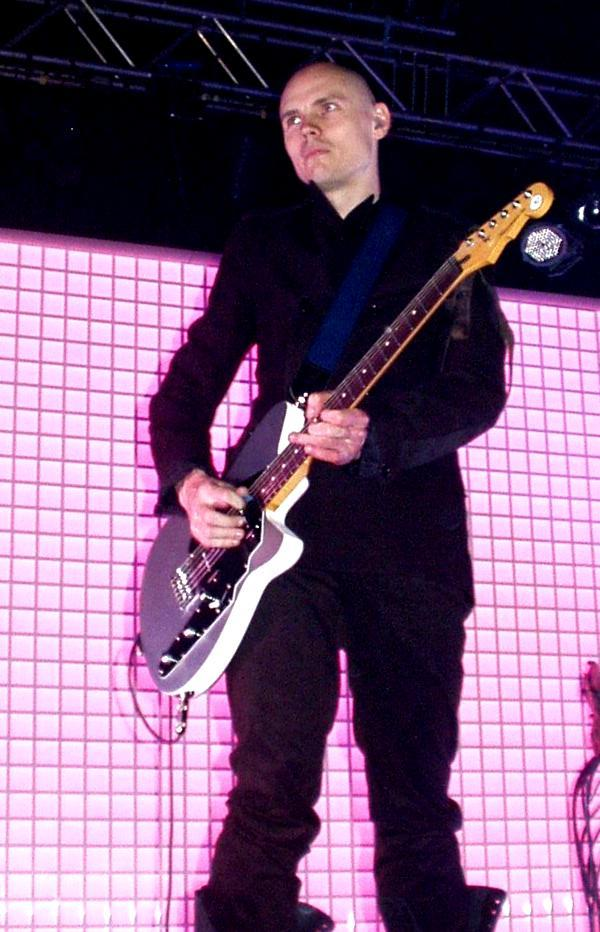
Billy Corgan

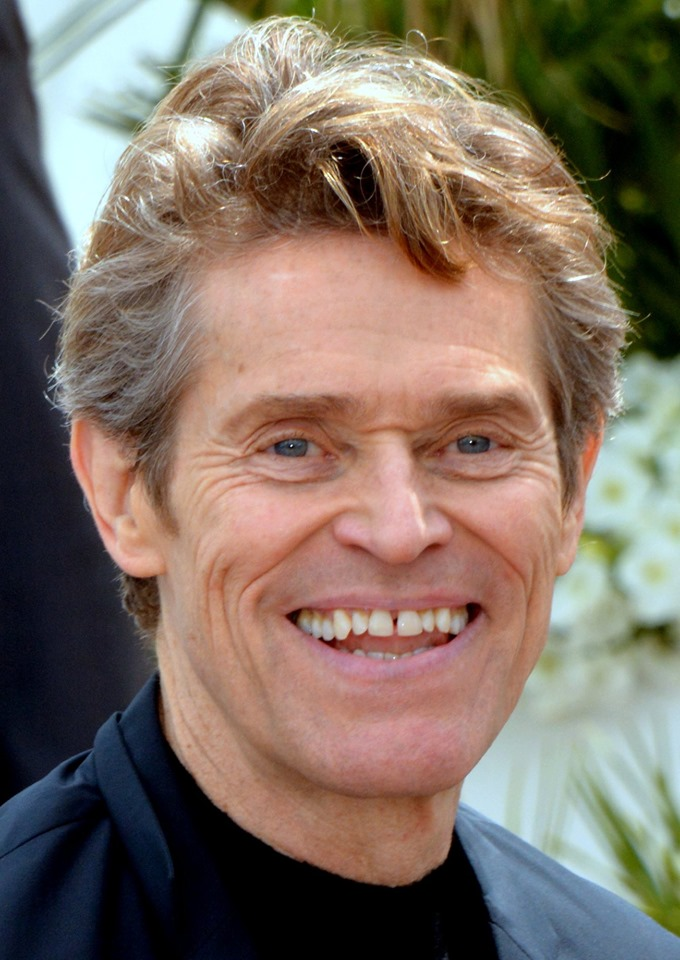
Willem Dafoe

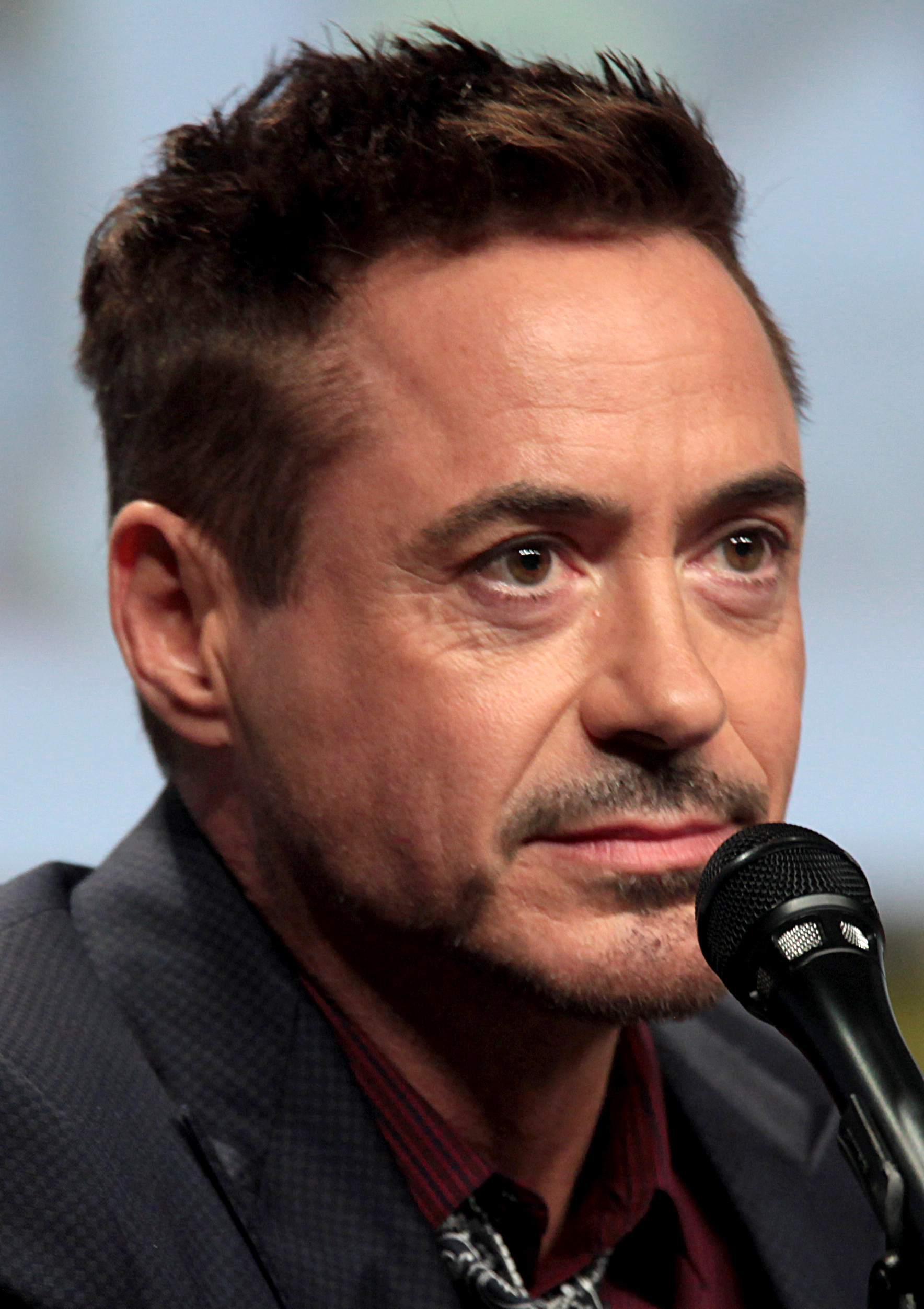
Robert Downey Jr.

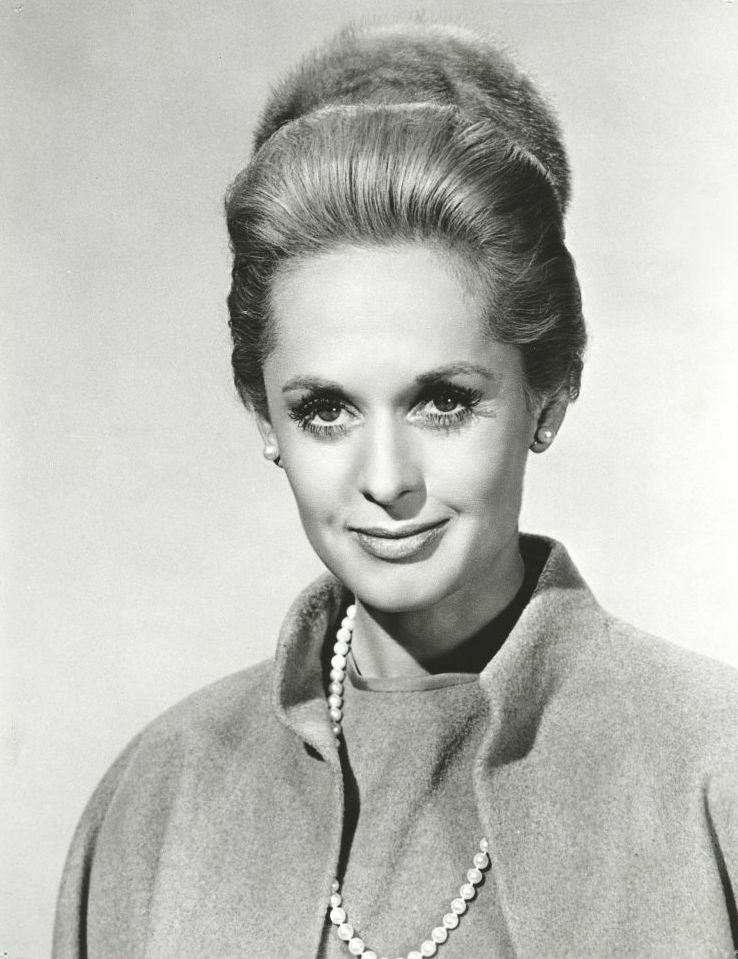
Tippi Hedren

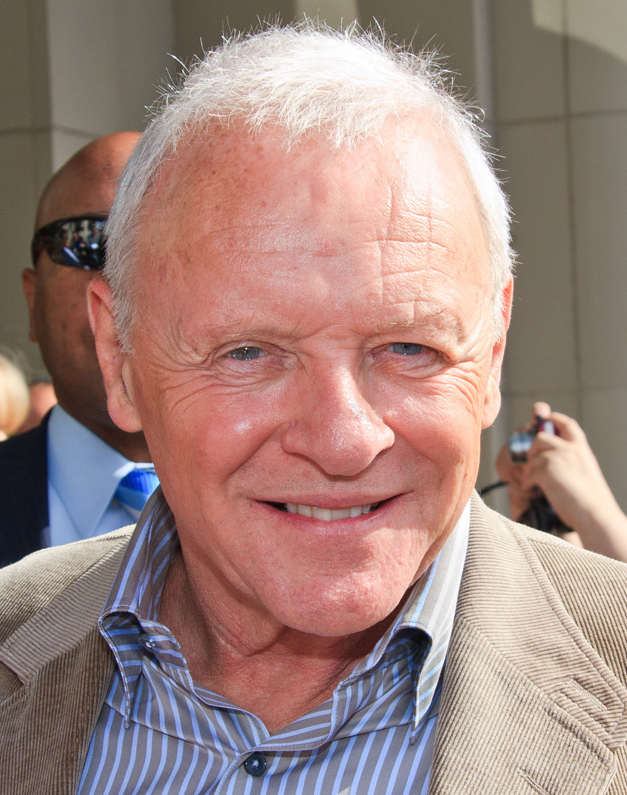
Anthony Hopkins

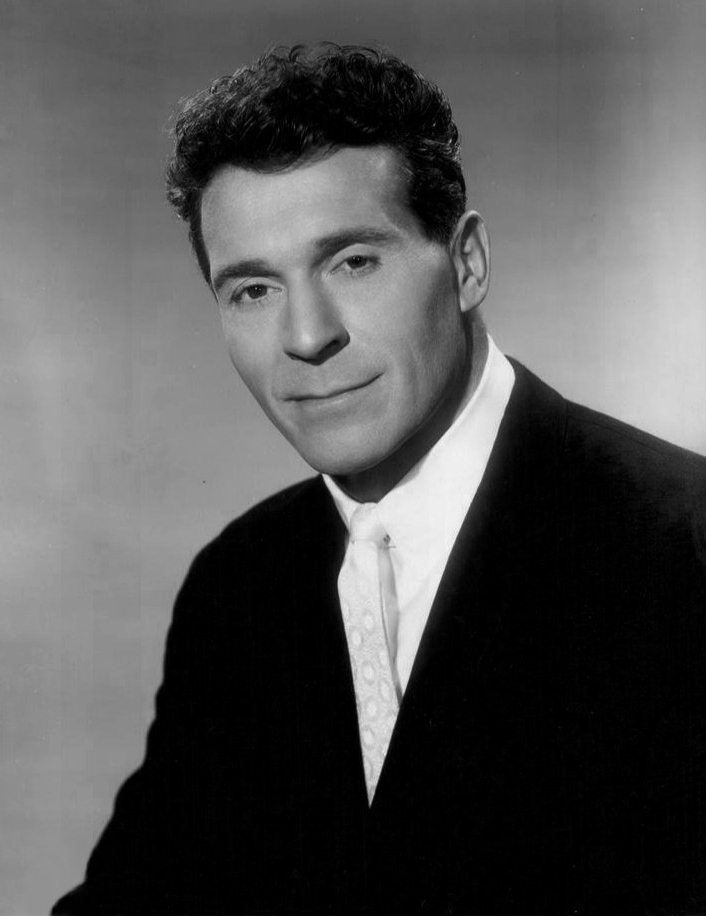
Jack LaLanne

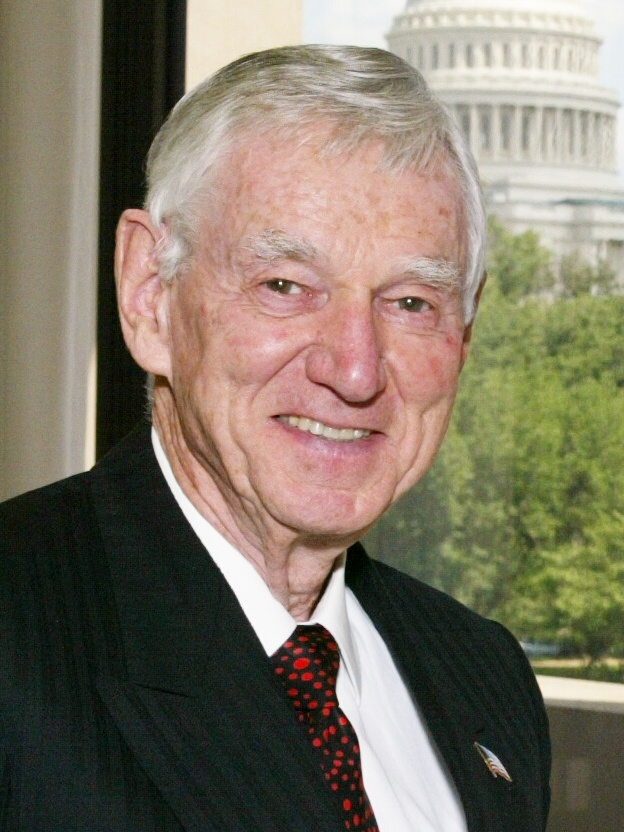
David H. Murdock

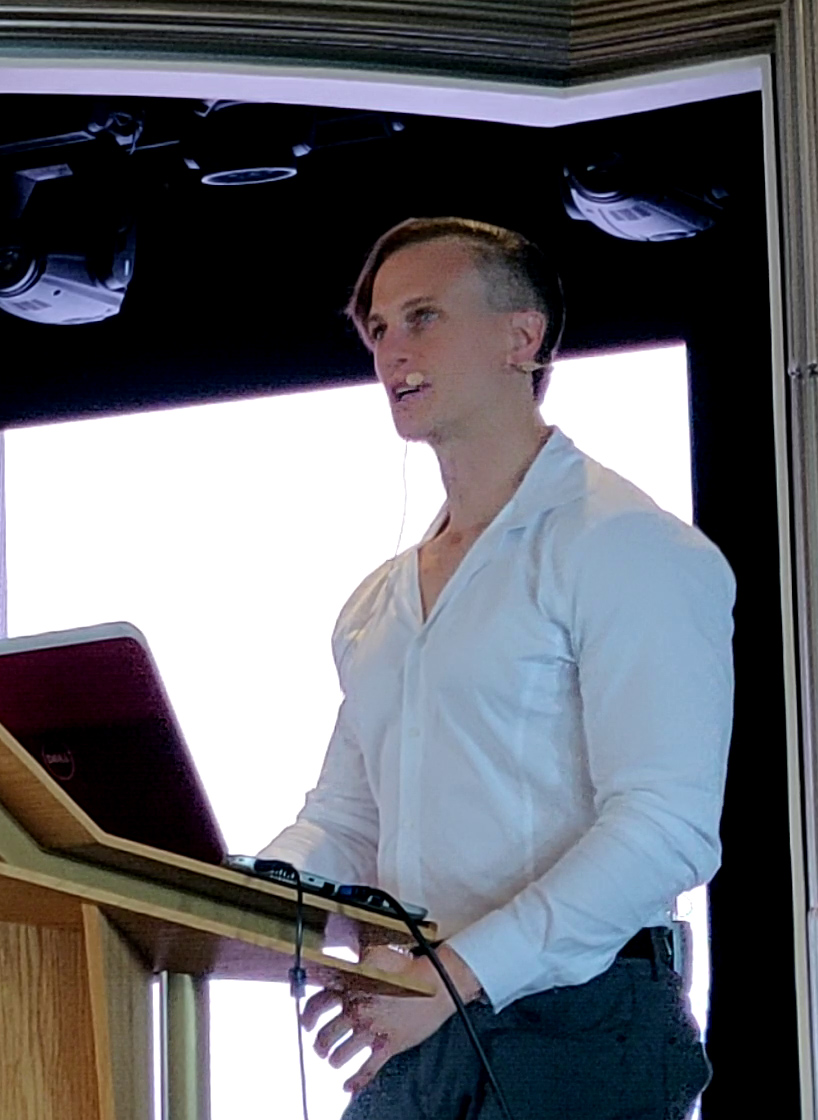
Fiann Paul

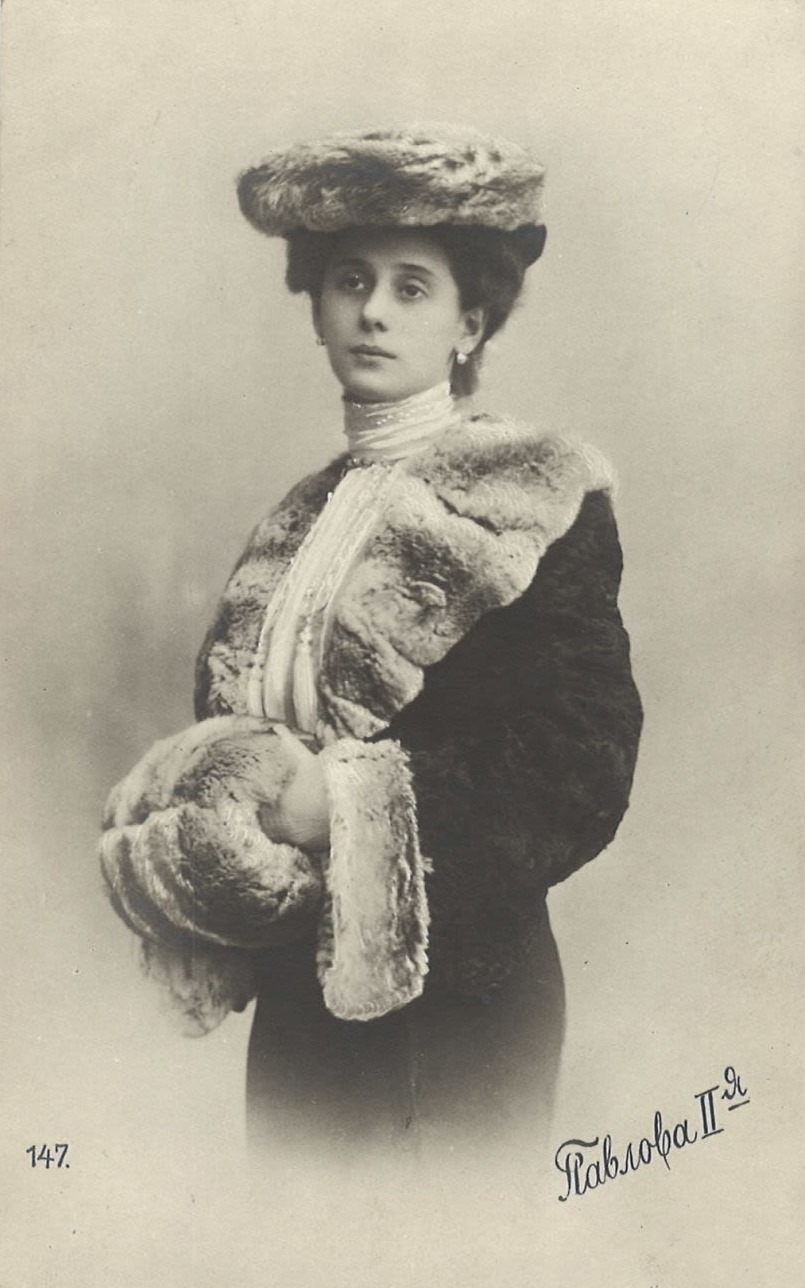
Anna Pavlova

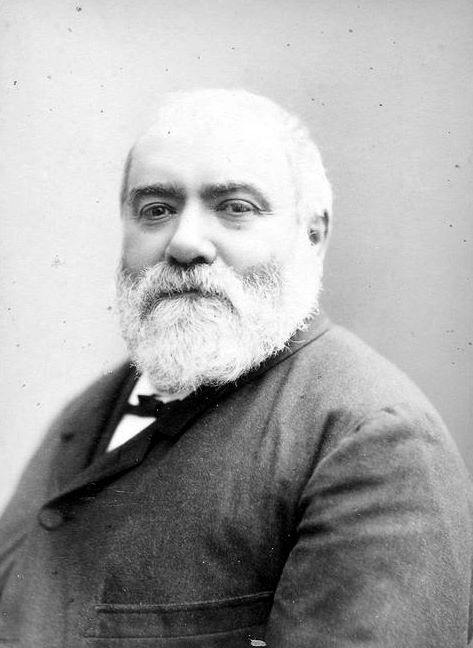
Francisque Sarcey

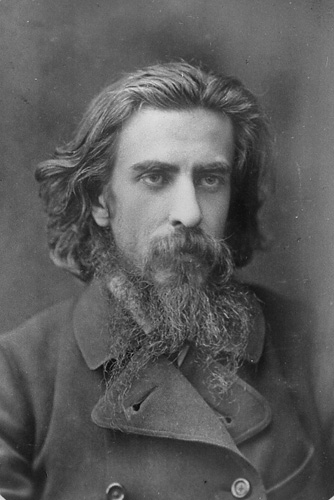
Vladimir Solovyov

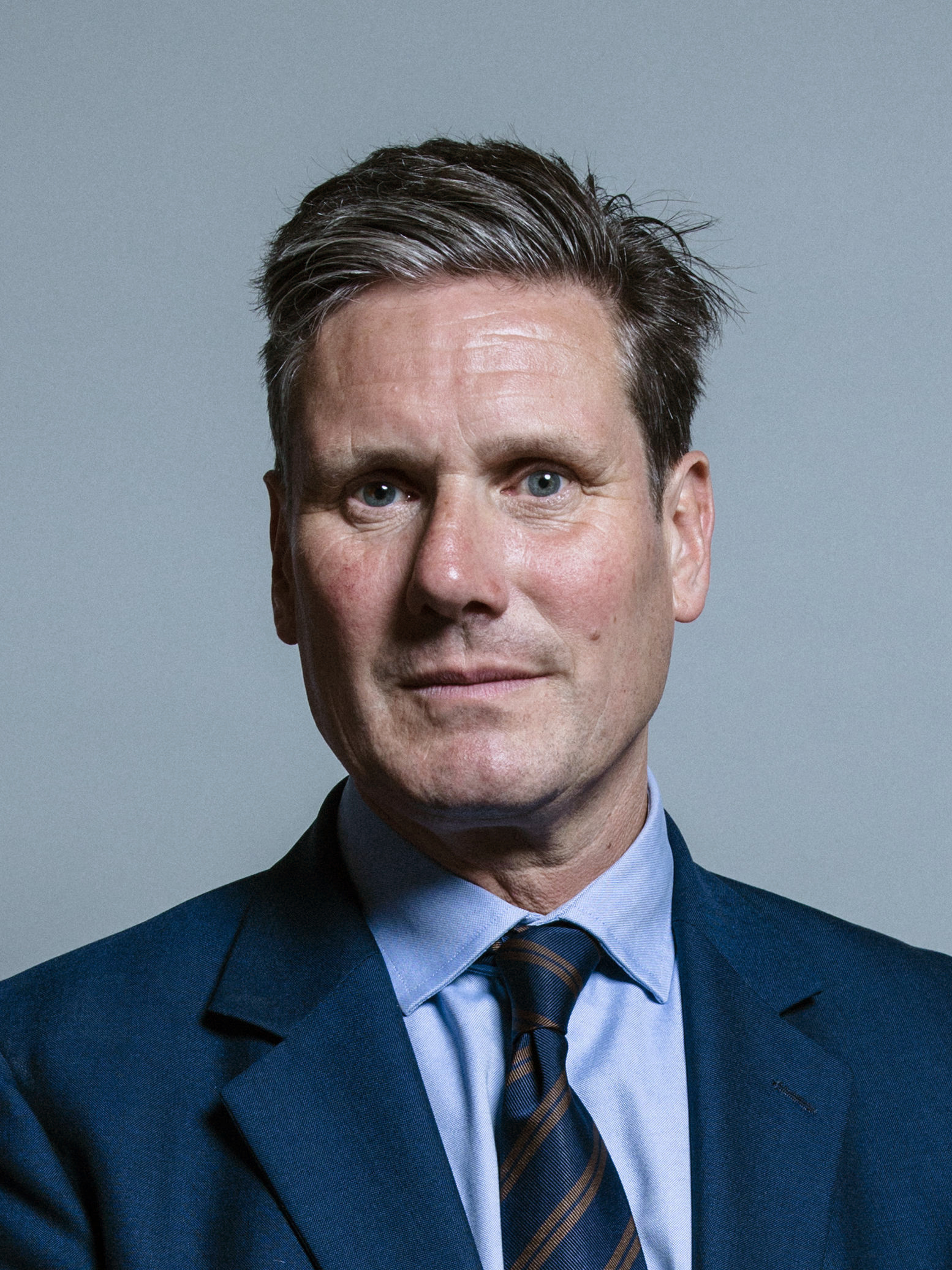
Keir Starmer

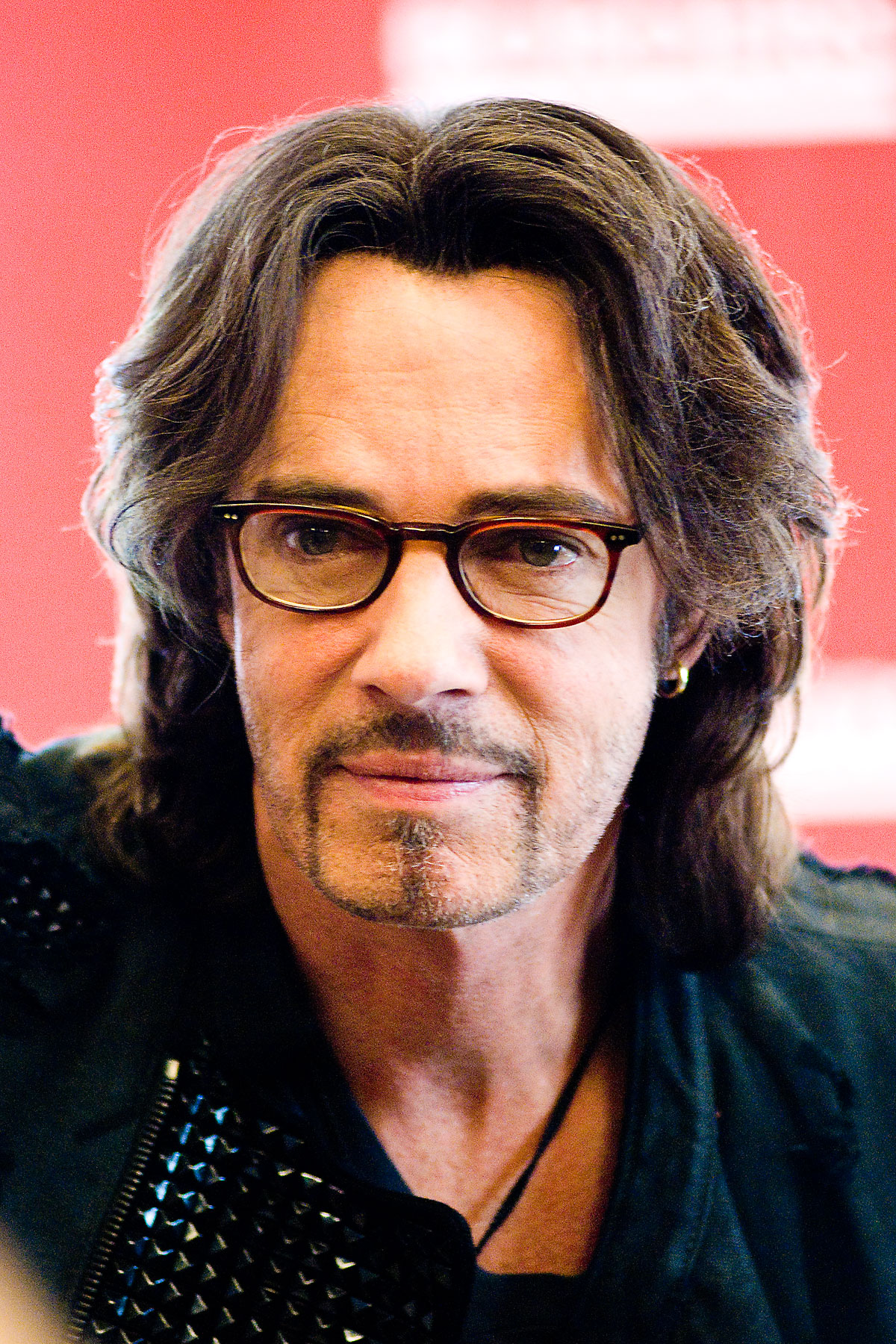
Rick Springfield

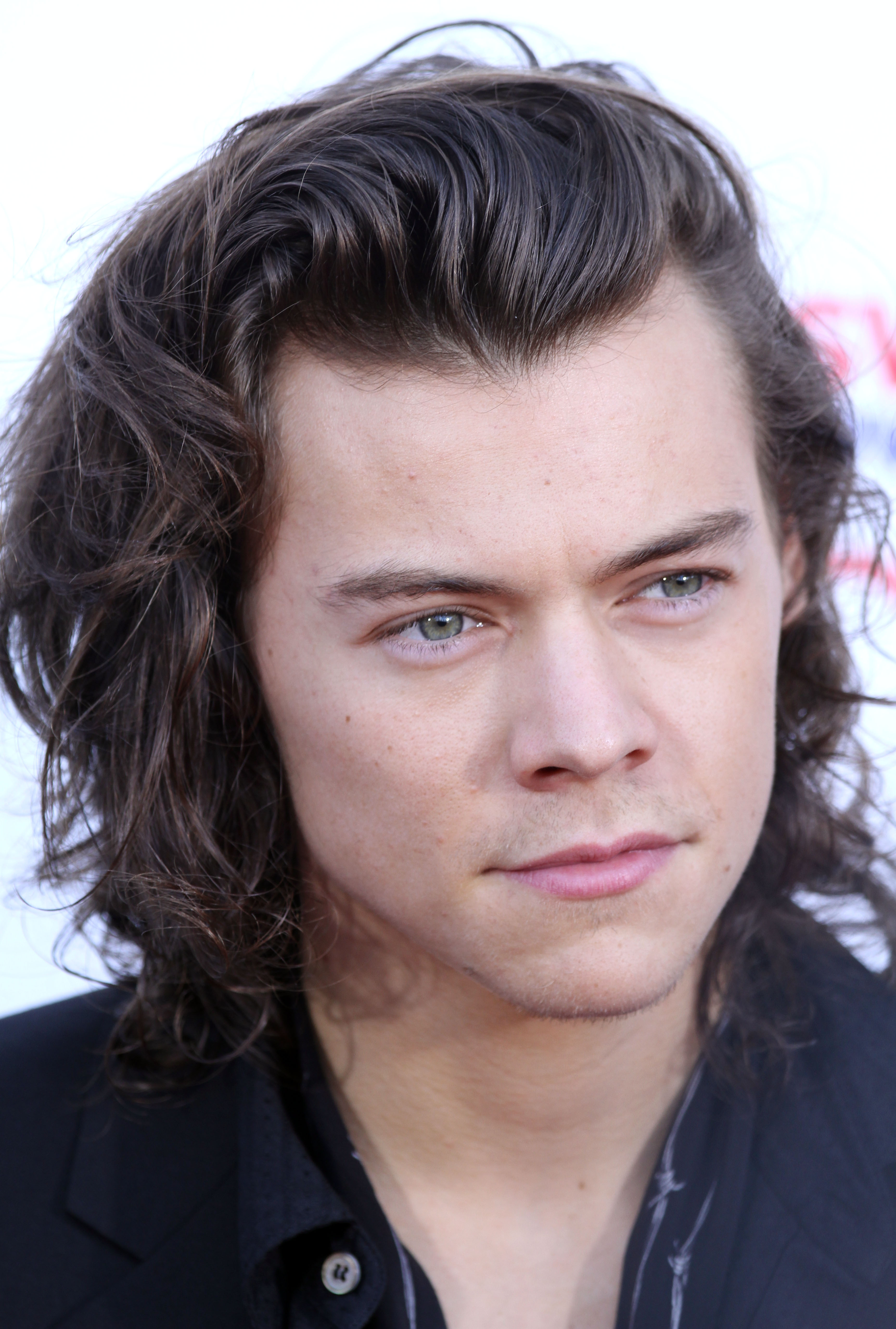
Harry Styles

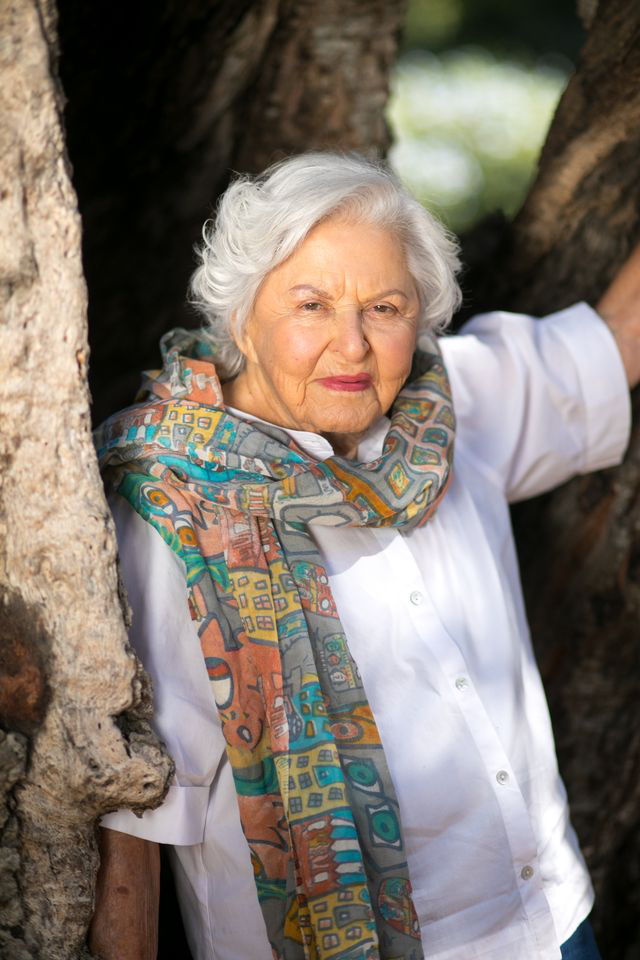
Deborah Szekely

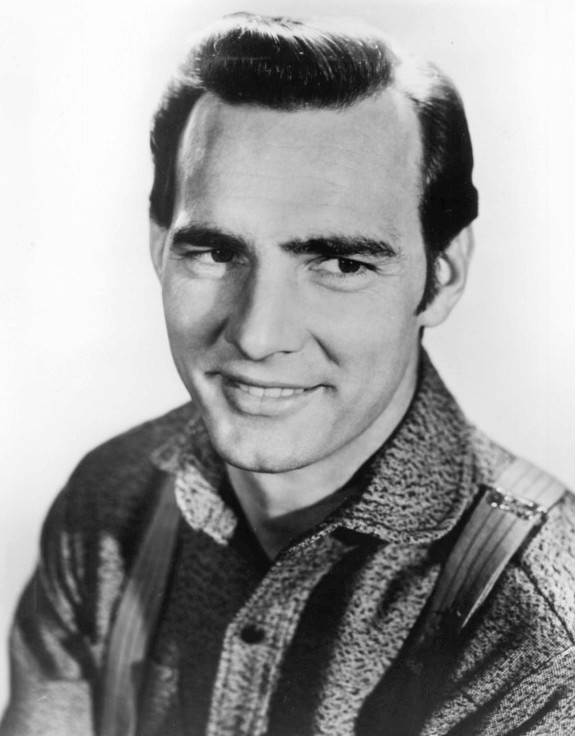
Dennis Weaver

Name	Occupation	Country	Sources
John Abraham	Actor	India	
Eric Adams	Politician	United States	
Jamal Adams	American football player	United States	
Scott Adams	Cartoonist	United States	
Manohar Aich	Bodybuilder	India	
Bea Alonzo	Actress	Philippines	
Mira Aroyo	Musician	Bulgaria	
Rosanna Arquette	Actress	United States	
Margaret Atwood	Novelist	Canada	
Aurora	Singer	Norway	
Beauden Barrett	Professional rugby player	New Zealand	
Clarence Bass	Fitness expert	United States	
Dave Bautista	Actor	United States	
Victoria Beckham	Singer	United Kingdom	
Yella Beezy	Rapper	United States	
Dirk Benedict	Actor	United States	
Mary Berg	Celebrity chef	Canada	
Dāvis Bertāns	Professional basketball player	Latvia	
Beyoncé	Singer	United States	
Rowan Blanchard	Actress	United States	
Livingstone Bramble	Boxer	United States Virgin Islands	
Phoebe Bridgers	Musician	United States	
Eleanor Bron	Actress	United Kingdom	
Ellen Burstyn	Actress	United States	
Mark Butler	Politician	Australia	
Kari Byron	Television host	United States	
Tracy Chapman	Musician	United States	
Parvesh Cheena	Actor	United States	
Deepak Chopra	Author	United States	
Tzuyu Chou	Singer	Taiwan and South Korea	
Lily Cole	Model	United Kingdom	
Common	Musician	United States	
Misty Copeland	Professional ballet dancer	United States	
Billy Corgan	Musician	United States	
Abbie Cornish	Actress, musician	Australia	
Fearne Cotton	Television presenter	United Kingdom	
Laverne Cox	Actress	United States	
Mark Cuban	Businessman	United States	
Kaley Cuoco	Actress	United States	
Jamie Lee Curtis	Actress	United States	
Miley Cyrus	Musician	United States	
Chuck D	Musician	United States	
Ted Danson	Actor	United States	
Alan Davies	Actor	United Kingdom	
Ellen DeGeneres	Television host	United States	
Jermain Defoe	Professional footballer	United Kingdom	
Willem Dafoe	Actor	United States	
Lizzie Deignan	Professional cyclist	United Kingdom	
Zooey Deschanel	Actress	United States	
Varun Dhawan	Actor	India	
Alesha Dixon	Singer	United Kingdom	
Robert Downey Jr.	Actor	United States	
David Duchovny	Actor	United States	
Susie Essman	Comedian and actress	United States	
Kevin Eubanks	Musician	United States	
Ali Ewoldt	Actress	United States	
Justin Fields	American football quarterback	United States	
Waka Flocka Flame	Musician	United States	
Harrison Ford	Actor	United States	
Laura Jane Fraser	Journalist	United States	
Robert Fripp	Musician	United Kingdom	
Peter Gabriel	Musician	United Kingdom	
R'Bonney Gabriel	Model	United States	
Ben Gibbard	Singer-songwriter	United States	
Peter Gideon	Farmer	United States	
Amber Gill	Television personality	United Kingdom	
Kimiko Glenn	Actress	United States	
Paul Greenberg	Author	United States	
Yael Grobglas	Actress	Israel	
Anne Hathaway	Actress	United States	
Tippi Hedren	Actress	United States	
Amanda Holden	Actress, television personality	United Kingdom	
Calum Hood	Bassist of 5 Seconds Of Summer	Australia	
Anthony Hopkins	Actor	Wales	
Vanessa Hudgens	Actress	United States	
Song Il-kook	Actor	South Korea	
Samantha Katie James	Actress	Malaysia	
Steve Jobs	Business magnate, industrial designer	United States	
Daniel Johns	Musician	Australia	
Julie Kavner	Actress	United States	
Emma Kenney	Actress	United States	
Mark Kermode	Film critic	United Kingdom	
Daniel Kessler	Guitarist	United Kingdom	
Claudia Kim	Model and actress	South Korea	
Barbara J. King	Anthropologist	United States	
Karlie Kloss	Fashion model and television host	United States	
Kristin Kreuk	Actress	Canada	
Jack LaLanne	Bodybuilder	United States	
Nene Leakes	Television personality	United States	
Donovan Leitch	Musician	Scotland	
Valter Longo	Scientist, professor and author	Italy and United States	
Nadine Lustre	Actress	Philippines	
Melaine Lynskey	Actress	New Zealand	
Hyori Lee	Musician	South Korea	
Shaina Magdayao	Actress	Philippines	
Wendie Malick	Actress	Canada and United States	
Taryn Manning	Actress	United States	
Amanda Marcotte	Blogger and journalist	United States	
Mario	Singer	United States	
Jan Maxwell	Actress	United States	
Gillian McKeith	Television presenter	United Kingdom	
Sir Ian McKellen	Actor	United Kingdom	
Eva Mendes	Actress	United States	
Emmanuel Sabbi	Professional soccer player	United States	
Tamyra Mensah-Stock	Wrestler	United States	
Yehudi Menuhin	Violinist	United Kingdom and United States	
Dannii Minogue	Singer-songwriter	Australia	
Harold Monro	Poet	Belgium	
Mary Tyler Moore	Actress	United States	
Chloë Grace Moretz	Actress	United States	
David H. Murdock	Businessman	United States	
Ralph Nader	Political activist	United States	
Martina Navratilova	Professional tennis player	Czechia and United States	
Francis William Newman	Scholar and philosopher	Great Britain	
Richard Norton	Martial artist	Australia	
U Nu	Politician	Myanmar	
Steve-O	Actor	United States	
Natasha Oakley	Model	Australia	
Diether Ocampo	Actor	Philippines	
Gizele Oliveira	Model	Brazil	
Jenna Ortega	Actress	United States	
David Oyelowo	Actor	United Kingdom	
Amanda Palmer	Musician	United States	
Adele Parks	Author	United Kingdom	
Fiann Paul	Explorer, athlete and artist	Iceland	
Anna Pavlova	Ballet dancer	Russia	
Fiona Phillips	Journalist	United Kingdom	
Sidney Poitier	Actor	United States	
Tao Porchon-Lynch	Yoga master	United States	
CM Punk	Mixed martial artist	United States	
Chris Pureka	Singer-songwriter	United States	
Susanna Reid	Television presenter	United Kingdom	
Alice Roberts	Biological anthropologist	United Kingdom	
Mary Robinson	Politician	Ireland	
Carlos P. Romulo	Diplomat	Philippines	
Rafael Rosell	Actor	Philippines	
Olesya Rulin	Actress	Russia and United States	
Shaun Ryder	Singer-songwriter	United Kingdom	
Sadhguru	Spiritual teacher	India	
Francisque Sarcey	Journalist	France	
Andy Serkis	Actor	United Kingdom	
Shanina Shaik	Model	Australia	
Claressa Shields	Professional boxer	United States	
Geno Smith	American football quarterback	United States	
Queen Sofía of Spain	Queen of Spain	Spain	
Vladimir Solovyov	Philosopher	Russia	
Rick Springfield	Musician	Australia	
Keir Starmer	Politician	United Kingdom	
Wayne Static	Musician	United States	
Howard Stern	Television personality	United States	
Ben Stiller	Actor	United States	
Spencer Strider	Professional baseball pitcher	United States	
Harry Styles	Musician	United Kingdom	
Deborah Szekely	United States	Philanthropist	
T.I.	Rapper	United States	
Jason Vale	Author	United Kingdom	
Kirsten Vangsness	Actress	United States	
Ellsworth Wareham	Surgeon	United States	
Dennis Weaver	Actor	United States	
Andrew Weil	Celebrity doctor	United States	
Jo Whiley	Television presenter	United Kingdom	
Elsie de Wolfe	Actress	United States	
David Zabriskie	Road bicycle racer	United States	

== See also ==
- List of vegans
- List of vegetarians
- List of fictional vegetarian characters
