= Cord (film) =

- Directed by: Sidney J. Furie
- Written by: Joel Hladecek; Yas Takata
- Produced by: Mark Amin
- Starring: Daryl Hannah; Jennifer Tilly; Bruce Greenwood; Vincent Gallo
- Cinematography: Curtis Petersen
- Edited by: Saul Pincus
- Music by: Robert Carli
- Production companies: Blue Rider Picture; GFT Paquin Entertainment
- Distributed by: Trimark Home Video (USA)
- Release dates: March 3, 2000 (Russia); May 23, 2000 (USA)
- Running time: 100 minutes
- Country: Canada
- Language: English
- Budget: $3.5 million

Cord (also released as Hide and Seek) is a 2000 thriller film directed by Sidney J. Furie and starring Daryl Hannah, Jennifer Tilly, Bruce Greenwood, and Vincent Gallo.

== Plot ==
After struggling with infertility, Anne (Daryl Hannah) finally succeeds in getting pregnant through invitro fertilization with her husband Jack (Bruce Greenwood). Anne awakens one night to find a masked intruder in her room. Before she can escape the intruder knocks her out with chloroform and takes her to an isolated house where she finds herself the captive of Frank (Vincent Gallo) and Helen (Jennifer Tilly). Helen went insane after Frank learned their baby would be deformed and aborted it. The procedure left her sterile, Frank wants to make amends by giving her Anne's baby. Anne recognizes Frank as a technician from the fertility clinic, and Helen reveals he secretly replaced her fertilized egg with one of Helen's.

Frank stages a car accident with a horribly burned body to fake Anne's death. Jack refuses to accept it was her, but after several months of investigating the police can no longer be pressured. During that time, several failed escape attempts have left Frank frustrated with Helen's bipolar instability and her refusal to have sex with him while she is "pregnant". When Frank forces himself on Anne, Helen interrupts. Frank attempts a forcible amniocentesis and lets slip he never switched her eggs. Helen snaps and kills, dismembers, and cooks Frank's body. Increasingly insane, she threatens Anne with a caesarean section. Anne finally escapes, and while she talk to Jack from a pay phone, telling him where the house is, Helen rams the phone booth with her truck and chases Anne away with a gun. Anne is later found collapsed on the roadside by a local teenager.

The police still refuse to believe Anne is alive, so Jack travels to Helen's house and is ambushed by Helen with a baseball bat. Helen gets away, kills a nurse at the hospital, and kidnaps Anne to force her into having the baby. Anne struggles with Helen and strangles her. As the police take her away, Anne emerges from the house with Jack and the new baby.

== Cast ==
- Daryl Hannah as Anne White
- Jennifer Tilly as Helen
- Bruce Greenwood as Jack
- Vincent Gallo as Frank

== Reception ==
Nathan Rabin from The A.V. Club gave the film a very bad review, stating: "Director Sidney J. Furie's (Ladybugs, Iron Eagle 4) latest is bereft of suspense, but so full of embarrassing low points that it's impossible to single out just one. Who could choose between seeing Hannah force-fed against her will through a tube and watching Tilly yell at the grotesque doll baby she's attached to her stomach to simulate pregnancy? For that matter, who could choose between Gallo forcing a very-pregnant Hannah to run in front of his tractor as exercise and Tilly threatening to perform a makeshift caesarian on Hannah with a pair of sharp scissors? It all adds up to one of the most deeply unpleasant films in recent memory, ineptly executed schlock that's as fun to watch as videotaped footage of terrified real-life hostages blankly reiterating their captors' demands." Mitch from The Video Vacuum gave it two stars and wrote: "Hide and Seek has a solid enough premise. It's just that the script plays all its cards too soon and things fizzle out long before the finale. Fans of Tilly will want to check it out just to see her do her thing, but all in all, it's not worth seeking out."
