= Jeff Wexler =

American sound engineer (1947–2025)

- Born: Jeffrey Simon Wexler; April 18, 1947; Chicago, Illinois, U.S.
- Died: December 9, 2025 (aged 78); Santa Monica, California, U.S.
- Occupation: Production sound mixer
- Years active: 1972–2016
- Father: Haskell Wexler
- Relatives: Mark Wexler (half-brother); Jerrold Wexler (uncle)

Jeffrey Simon Wexler (April 18, 1947 – December 9, 2025) was an American production sound mixer. He was nominated for two Academy Awards in the category Best Sound. Wexler worked on more than 70 films since 1972. He was the son of cinematographer Haskell Wexler. Jeff Wexler died from chronic kidney disease at his home in Santa Monica, California, on December 9, 2025, at the age of 78.

== Selected filmography ==
- Coming Home (1978)
- Foul Play (1978)
- Being There (1979)
- 9 to 5 (1980)
- An Officer and a Gentleman (1982)
- The Natural (1984)
- Get Shorty (1995)
- Independence Day (1996)
- Jerry Maguire (1996)
- As Good as It Gets (1997)
- Fight Club (1999)
- Almost Famous (2000)
- 61* (2001)
- The Last Samurai (2003)
- The Family Stone (2005)
- Mission: Impossible III (2006)
- 42 (2013)
