= Curtain Up! =

Curtain Up! (2009) is an announced British stage comedy by Peter Quilter, a reworking of his own all-female first play Respecting Your Piers (1998). It is to be re-published by Samuel French Ltd. The show is popular with amateur groups in the UK, where it has been produced over 100 times. It has also had productions in New Zealand, Belgium, and Australia.
