= Tanya Wexler =

American film director (b. 1970)

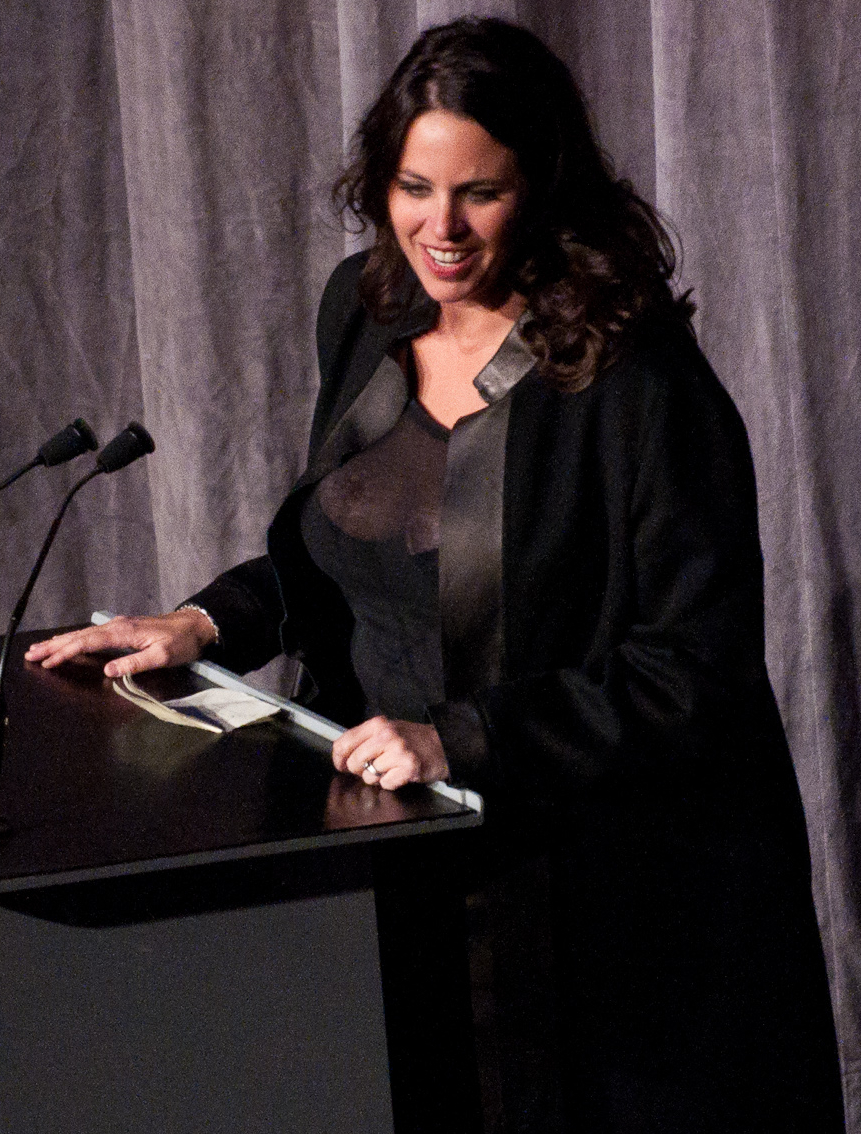
- Wexler in 2011
- Born: August 6, 1970 (age 56); Chicago, Illinois, U.S.
- Education: Yale University; Columbia University (MFA)
- Occupation: Film director
- Years active: 1998–present
- Spouse: Amy Zimmerman
- Children: 4
- Father: Jerrold Wexler
- Relatives: Daryl Hannah (half-sister); Page Hannah (half-sister); Haskell Wexler (uncle)

Tanya Wexler (born August 6, 1970) is an American film director. Wexler has been working in the film industry since 1998, when her first film Finding North (1998), was released. Wexler is most known for her 2011 feature film Hysteria. Wexler is known for exploring women's issues in her films and including complex female characters. Wexler has also been involved in advocating for women in the film industry, and advocating for the rights of the LGBTQ+ community.

== Early life ==
Wexler was born on August 6, 1970, in Chicago, Illinois. Wexler is the daughter of Chicago real estate developer Jerrold Wexler, and his second wife, Susan Jeanne (née Metzger). She is the niece of cinematographer Haskell Wexler. Her mother has two other daughters, Daryl Hannah and Page Hannah, as well as a son, Donald, from a previous marriage. Wexler's father is Jewish, whereas her mother is Catholic. Wexler worked as a child actor from a young age.

She attended Yale University ('92) where she studied psychology and was roommates with actress Bellamy Young. Wexler also holds a Master of Fine Arts degree from Columbia University ('95).

== Career ==
Wexler has been active in the film industry for over two decades (1998–present). Throughout her career, Wexler has been involved in both film and television directing and producing. Originally Wexler wanted to be an actress. Wexler decided to be a director when she was more interested in the pre-production and production processes, rather than acting which has little involvement in the two previously mentioned processes. Wexler has directed five feature films: Finding North (1998), Relative Evil (2001), Hysteria (2011), Buffaloed (2019), and Jolt (2021). Wexler also directed portions of the following TV Series: The Girlfriend's Guide to Divorce (2017), The Arrangement (2018), and Partner Track (2022). Wexler is involved in producing the upcoming Amazon Prime Movie, Tough Love. Wexler has been nominated for, and won awards for her work in film and television directing. Wexler's most popular film is Hysteria (2011).

== Hysteria (2011) ==
Wexler's 2011 feature film, Hysteria, starring Maggie Gyllenhaal and Hugh Dancy, is a satirical romcom about the man who created the vibrator (Joseph Mortimer Granville) and the experience of being a woman in Victorian England. The vibrator was invented in 1883, by Granville to treat male muscle complaints. A few historians have asserted that the vibrator was used as a replacement for genital massages used to treat hysteria, however these claims are unsubstantiated. In the Victorian age, vibrators were branded as a medical tool. Wexler has said that the point of this film is to empower women to take charge of their own happiness. In 2011, this film was nominated for "Best Film" at Verzaubert International Gay and Lesbian Film Festival.

== Personal life ==
Wexler met her wife, Amy Zimmerman, during her time at Yale University. Wexler and Zimmerman married on May 19, 2004, in Massachusetts, the first U.S. state to issue marriage licenses to same-sex couples. Wexler has four children: a son named Jerrold (born 1999) and three daughters named Ella (born 2000), Ruby (born 2003), and Violet (born 2006) with her former wife, Amy Zimmerman. Wexler and Zimmerman each birthed two of their children. As a young couple, Zimmerman did not expect to have children, as it was not very normalized for gay couples to have children at the time. Wexler was the first to propose the idea of having children, and Zimmerman accepted. Wexler now lives in New York City with her family and their dog, Snoopy.

== Filmography ==
Film

- Finding North (1998)
- Relative Evil (2001)
- Hysteria (2011)
- Buffaloed (2019)
- Jolt (2021)

Television

Year	Title	Notes
2017	Girlfriends' Guide to Divorce	Episode "Rule No. 706: Let Them Eat Cupcakes"
2018	The Arrangement	Episode "You Are Not Alone"
2022	Partner Track	Episode "Out of Office" and "Client Relations"
TBA	Tough Love	TV movie; Also executive producer

== Awards and nominations ==
Throughout her career, Wexler's work has been recognized by various awards and nominations. In 2003, Wexler's film Relative Evil (2001), won “Best Feature” at Washington DC Independent Film Festival. In 1998, Wexler's film Finding North (1998), was nominated for “Best Film” at Verzaubert-International Gay and Lesbian Film Festival. In 2011, Wexler's Film Hysteria (2011), was nominated for the Golden Marc’Aurelio Award at the Rome Film Festival.

== Activism ==
Wexler has often been involved in activism throughout her adulthood. Wexler has been involved in advocating for LGBTQ+ rights and advocating for more female inclusion in the male dominated film industry. Wexler has spoken out about how the number of women that are given directorial roles in the film industry is not anywhere near the number of men who are given those opportunities. Wexler has stated that she hopes room is made "at the table," for everyone. As a member of the community, Wexler has advocated for the LGBTQ+ community's rights for a long time. For example, Wexler has served on the board of directors for the Gay and Lesbian Alliance Against Defamation (GLAAD).

== See also ==
- List of female film and television directors
- List of lesbian filmmakers
- List of LGBT-related films directed by women
