= Pimlico Plumbers =

British plumbing firm based in London

- Type: Domestic service provider
- Industry: Plumbing, electrical wiring, heating, roofing
- Founded: 1979
- Headquarters: London, England
- Key people: Charlie Mullins (Founder)
- Revenue: ▼£43.27m (2020)
- Owner: KKR & Co.
- Number of employees: ~350
- Parent: Neighborly Inc. Waco, Texas, USA
- Website: www.pimlicoplumbers.com

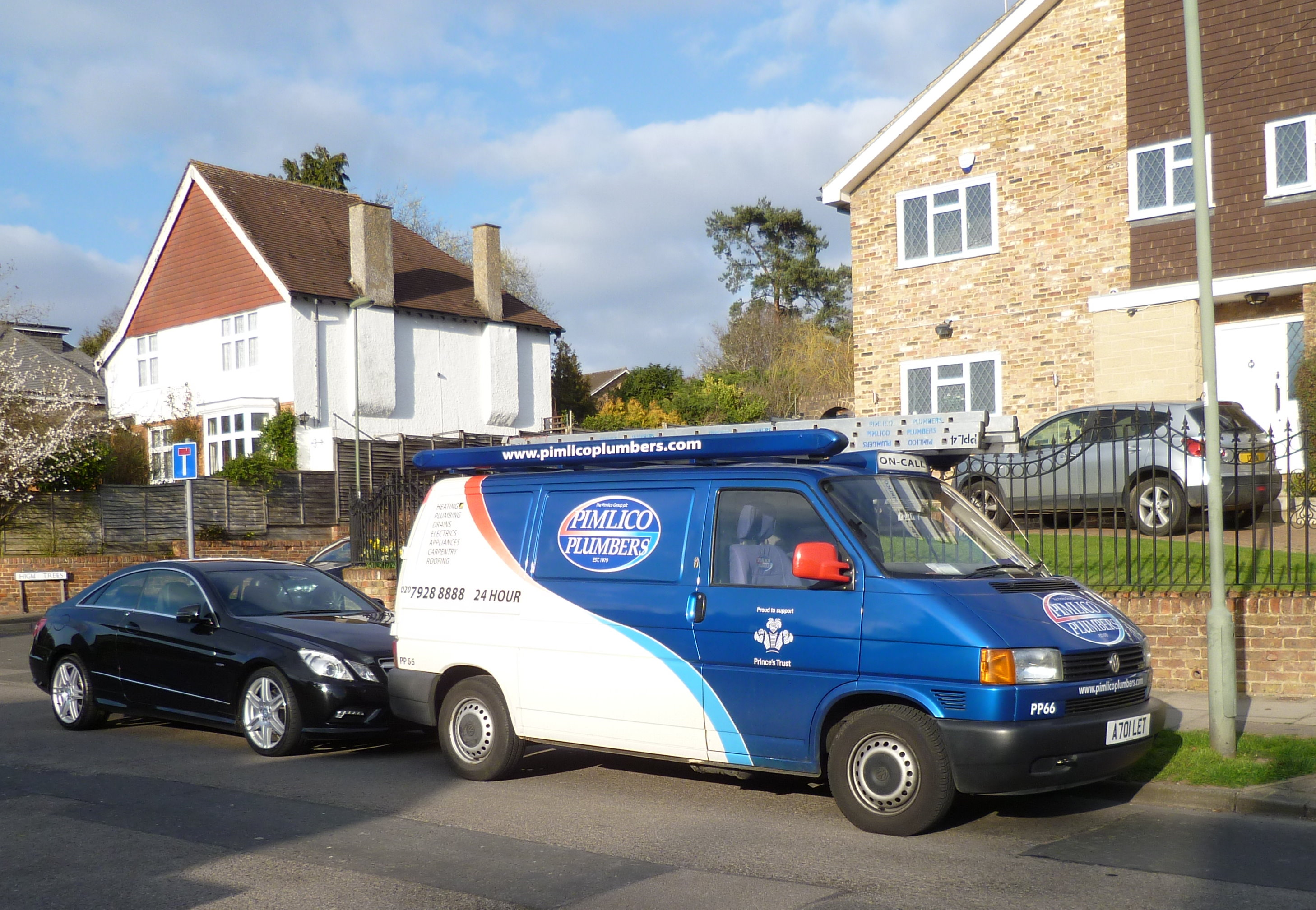
A Pimlico Plumbers van

Pimlico Plumbers is a London-based plumbing firm established in 1979. With revenues of £20m as of 2015, it is London's largest independent plumbing company.

== History ==
Pimlico Plumbers was established in 1979 by Charlie Mullins (born December 1952), who left school at 15 with no qualifications and began work as a plumber.

In September 2021, Mullins sold a 90% shareholding of Pimlico Plumbers to US home services group Neighborly in a deal worth between £125 million and £145 million. At the point of sale, the business had revenues of $70 million and employed over 400 people. Mullins' son, Scott Mullins, remains Chief Executive with a 10% stake. Mullins has lived in Costa del Sol since 2021.

== Publicity ==
The company owns more than 100 plumbing-related number plates, fitted to its fleet of vehicles, such as LO 02 OLD (Loo too old), BOG1, DRA1N, W4TER and others. It gained considerable publicity through its employment of Buster Martin, who claimed to be Britain's oldest worker, cleaning vans part-time until his death in 2011. The firm's boss presented BBC Three show Britain's Best Young Plumber, and has appeared on Secret Millionaire.

== Legal issues ==
In 2009, the firm was involved in a legal dispute with Steve Cosser, an Australian TV executive accused of industrial espionage in stealing Pimlico's client list after establishing a rival firm, Service Corps, using ex-Pimlico staff. Services Corps collapsed in January 2010 with debts of £100,000 before the case was settled.

The company also had a dispute with rival firm Aspect over Trustpilot ratings.

On 10 February 2017, in the Court of Appeal, a plumber who had initiated an Employment Tribunal case against the company in 2011 was found to have "worker" status for the purposes of various employment protection rights, notwithstanding that he had been engaged as a self-employed individual. Pimlico Plumbers argued the plumber was an independent contractor but the Court of Appeal determined he was a worker with some employment rights. The Supreme Court of the United Kingdom subsequently granted Pimlico permission to appeal, which, following a hearing on 20 and 21 February 2018, was unanimously dismissed.

== Community involvement and Brexit stance ==
The firm has been involved in a scheme in aid of the big society with the renovation of the Streatham Youth Centre. This was organised along with Wickes, A4e, and the Co-Sponsorship Agency.

In 2018, the company was criticised for erecting a large "Bollocks to Brexit" sign on top of their premises in Waterloo. Mullins defended the use of the sign, referring to the Sex Pistols' 1977 album Never Mind the Bollocks, Here's the Sex Pistols as precedent for being able to legally display the word in public.

== Financials ==
In November 2010, Mullins reported that he was considering floating the firm, with a £50m valuation, in order to fund a nationwide expansion. The firm's turnover was £18.2 million in 2013, with profits of more than £1,000,000.
