= Charlie Mullins =

English businessman

Charlie Mullins OBE
- Born: Sidney Charles Mullins; 28 October 1952 (age 73); St Pancras, London, England
- Occupation: Businessman
- Known for: Founder and CEO, Pimlico Plumbers
- Political party: Reform UK (since 2024)
- Spouses: Lynda Mullins; Julie Morris
- Children: 4

Sidney Charles Mullins OBE (born 28 October 1952) is an English businessman. He is the founder of Pimlico Plumbers, London's largest independent plumbing company, which he sold in 2021.

== Early life ==
Mullins's father was a factory worker and his mother was a cleaner. When he was born, they "lived in a couple of rooms in Camden", before moving to the Rockingham Estate in south London's Elephant and Castle area, where he grew up. He left school at 15 with no qualifications.

== Career ==
Mullins was apprenticed to a local plumber at age 15. In 1979, he founded Pimlico Plumbers operating from a basement in Pimlico.

He is known for his collection of plumbing-themed number plates, used on the company's vehicles, and worth around £1.5 million.

In September 2021, Mullins sold a 90% shareholding of Pimlico Plumbers to US home services group Neighborly in a deal worth between £125 million and £145 million. At the point of sale, the business had revenues of $70 million and employed over 400 people. Mullins's son, Scott Mullins, remains Chief Executive with a 10% stake.

== Politics ==
Pimlico Plumbers donated £22,735 to the Conservative Party in 2015, and Mullins donated more than £48,000, in the two years to July 2017. He was a business adviser to David Cameron and George Osborne, and was a vocal critic of Brexit.

In January 2018, Mullins announced that he would no longer be a Conservative Party donor, and announced his support for the Liberal Democrats, appearing at the party's conference in September of that year. He later declared his candidacy as an independent at the 2021 London mayoral election (which had been scheduled for 2020, before being postponed) but did not appear on the ballot paper. During the 2024 election campaign Mullins announced he had joined Reform UK.

In August 2023, Mullins's Twitter account was suspended after he posted a tweet saying that "someone should kill" Mayor of London Sadiq Khan. Mullins subsequently apologised for the tweet. In September 2024 following the Labour Party's general election win, Mullins announced that he would be selling his London penthouse and permanently relocating to Spain and Dubai, in response to rumours that the government intended to increase the rate for inheritance tax. In November 2024, he stated in an online video that he would move back to the UK if Nigel Farage became Prime Minister.

== Personal life ==
Mullins divorced his first wife, Lynda, to whom he had been married for 41 years. She is the mother of their four children, two of whom work for the company. He then married Julie Anne Morris, who also worked for Pimlico Plumbers. The couple later divorced.

Mullins was appointed Officer of the Order of the British Empire (OBE) in the 2015 New Year Honours, for services to the plumbing industry.

He owns a villa in Marbella, Spain.

== Works ==
- Bog-Standard Business: How I Took the Plunge and Became the Millionaire Plumber, 2015,288pp, ISBN 978-1784183356, John Blake Publishing Ltd.
