= Nevada International Film Festival =

- Location: Las Vegas, Nevada
- Country: United States
- Website: The Nevada International Film Festival

The Nevada International Film Festival (NIFF) is an international film festival granting film awards to independent films in Las Vegas, Nevada, United States. In 2011, Life! Camera Action... directed by Rohit Gupta received the Platinum Reel award for the Best Narrative feature film. In 2012, Bringing King to China directed by Kevin McKiernan received the Grand Jury Prize, the festival's most highest honor. Among the 10 winners of the 2012 Platinum Reel Award were Mumtaz Hussain (Art=(love)2) and Manan Singh Katohora (9 Eleven).

Vijay Vemuri took a prize for his short film Artificial and Himesh Bhorgo won for his short Jurisdiction; while Abhinav Tiwari took one of 10 Golden Reel Awards for OASS, a drama about sex trafficking in Nepal. Filmmaker Sezen Kayhan won a Special Jury Award in 2013, for his short film Erik Zamanı (Time of The Plums). It shared the award with director, screenwriter and cinematographer Roozbeh Dadvand’s Mossaddegh, which tells of Iran’s former Prime Minister Mohammed Mossaddegh. An Inconsistent Truth, starring Phil Valentine, won Best Documentary in 2012.
