= Robert Estrin =

American film editor

- Born: March 3, 1942 (age 83); Lakewood, New Jersey, United States
- Occupation: Film editor

Robert L. Estrin (born 3 March 1942 in Lakewood, New Jersey) is an American film editor.

== Career ==
Estrin started his career in the 1970s. His first work was a documentary feature about the photographer Imogen Cunningham. Later he also edited feature films such as The Candidate (1972), Badlands (1973) and Memory of Us (1974). His last work was the cut of the 1995 comedy film The Perez Family.

Estrin's sister Sandra Adair also works as a film editor.

== Selected filmography ==
Editor
Year	Film	Director
1972	The Candidate	Michael Ritchie
1973	Badlands	Terrence Malick
1976	Pipe Dreams	Stephen Verona
1978	Mirrors	Noel Black
1983	Breathless	Jim McBride
1985	Desert Hearts	Donna Deitch
1988	Colors	Dennis Hopper
1990	Internal Affairs	Mike Figgis
1991	The Cabinet of Dr. Ramirez	Peter Sellars
1992	A River Runs Through It	Robert Redford
1995	The Perez Family	Mira Nair

Editorial department
Year	Film	Director	Role
1974	Memory of Us	H. Kaye Dyal	Supervising editor
1988	Colors	Dennis Hopper	Supervising editor

Music department
Year	Film	Director	Role
1985	Desert Hearts	Donna Deitch	Music consultant

Producer
Year	Film	Director	Credit	Notes
1978	The Boss' Son	Bobby Roth	Executive producer	First collaboration with Bobby Roth

Thanks
Year	Film	Director	Role	Notes
1984	Heartbreakers	Bobby Roth	Thanks	Second collaboration with Bobby Roth

Documentaries

Editor
Year	Film	Director
1970	Imogen Cunningham, Photographer	John Korty
1971	Brazil: A Report on Torture	Haskell Wexler; Saul Landau
1971	The Numbers Start with the River	Donald Wrye
1986	What Happened to Kerouac?	Lewis MacAdams; Richard Lerner

Editorial department
Year	Film	Director	Role
1970	Imogen Cunningham, Photographer	John Korty	Assistant editor

Producer
Year	Film	Director	Credit
2017	The Secret Life of Lance Letscher	Sandra Adair	Co-producer
2020	The Boys Who Said No!	Judith Ehrlich	Executive producer
2024	Her Name Was Moviola	Howard Berry	Associate producer

TV documentaries

Editor
Year	Film	Director
1970	It Couldn't Be Done	Sheldon Fay Jr.; Walt deFaria
1970	The Unexplained	
1985	Creation of the Universe	

TV movies

Editor
Year	Film	Director
1982	Help Wanted	Stephen Gyllenhaal
1986	Maricela	Christine Burrill
1987	Young Harry Houdini	James Orr

TV series

Editor
Year	Title	Notes
1982	CBS Afternoon Playhouse	1 episode
1987	The Disney Sunday Movie	1 episode

TV shorts

Editor
Year	Film	Director
1976	Almos' a Man	Stan Lathan

== Awards ==
For his cut of the documentary film Creation of the Universe Estrin was nominated for an Eddie Award of American Cinema Editors in 1985.
