= The House of Mirth (disambiguation) =

The House of Mirth is a novel by Edith Wharton.

It may also refer to the film adaptations:

- The House of Mirth (1918 film)
- The House of Mirth (1981 film), an American television film
- The House of Mirth (2000 film)
