= Edgy =

Edgy may refer to:

- An alternate name for Edge (video game)
- Edgy Lee, American filmmaker
- Edgy, an extension of the programming language Snap! supporting graph algorithms
- Edgy Eft, an Ubuntu operating system release
- Edgy Women, a feminist performance festival 1994 - 2016
