= Underground (1976 film) =

- Directed by: Emile de Antonio; Mary Lampson; Haskell Wexler
- Produced by: Emile de Antonio; Mary Lampson; Haskell Wexler
- Starring: Bill Ayers; Kathy Boudin; Emile de Antonio; Bernardine Dohrn; Jeff Jones; Mary Lampson; Haskell Wexler; Cathy Wilkerson
- Cinematography: Haskell Wexler
- Edited by: Emile de Antonio; Mary Lampson
- Distributed by: Sphinx Productions
- Release date: 1976
- Running time: 87 minutes
- Country: United States
- Language: English

Underground is a 1976 documentary film about the Weathermen, founded as a militant faction of the Students for a Democratic Society (SDS), who fought to overthrow the U.S. government during the 1960s and 1970s. The film consists of interviews with members of the group after they went underground and footage of the anti-war and civil rights protests of the time. It was directed by Emile de Antonio, Haskell Wexler, and Mary Lampson, later subpoenaed by the Federal Bureau of Investigation in an attempt to confiscate the film footage in order to gain information that would help them arrest the Weathermen.

== Overview ==
Underground combines interviews with and archival footage of the Weathermen to provide a picture of this group, their opinions on American society, and their hopes for the future. The filmmakers use the material from their interactions with the Weathermen Bill Ayers, Kathy Boudin, Bernardine Dohrn, Jeff Jones and Cathy Wilkerson to structure its exploration of the formation and direction of the group. The film begins by presenting images and words that describe the Weathermen's process of being radicalized in the 1960s through the civil rights movement, the anti-war movement, and communist revolutionary struggles in Cuba, Russia and China, as well as historical struggles in the United States over Native American rights and labor issues. The film moves on to discuss the Weathermen's analysis of American society, addressing those who have inspired them, and further explaining the reasons behind their militancy, while also introducing the issue of tactics. The final section of the film addresses the group's use of property destruction as a way to bring about change and destabilize the current, and in their view, corrupt system. They state that "no revolution can take place successfully without an armed confrontation with the state." While the radicals themselves are reluctant to discuss the specifics of their bombings due to their unstable position as underground fugitives, the filmmakers provide us with a list of actions which they have undertaken. Underground provides an intimate look at the inner workings of the Weather Underground, and we see their discomfort with being filmed, their strong internal collective identity, and their isolation from society at large. The filmmakers do not use the interviews and juxtaposed images to promote the group or support their actions, and it is apparent that their motives for the film differ from those of the subjects that they are presenting. In the end this film provides an unprecedented look at how a group of middle-class Americans became militant revolutionaries, raising questions not only about the merits of their struggle, but also about past and future radical actions as well as over the political, social and cultural structure of the USA at that time.

== Historical context ==
This film is informed by the political and social unrest of the 1960s in the United States. The civil rights movement, Vietnam War (and subsequent anti-war movement), McCarthyism, unemployment and urban decay, and liberation struggles across many nations not only played into the creation of the Weather Underground, but also were a significant factor in Emile de Antonio's decision to use them as the focus of his film. It was made in 1975, following the group's involvement in bombing the Pentagon, and an accident at their Greenwich Village townhouse in which a bomb exploded prematurely, killing three Weathermen and driving the rest underground. Emile de Antonio attributes his decision to make this film to his own Marxist beliefs, his fascination with the political climate of the '60s and '70s, and his specific interest in the Weather Underground after reading their manifesto Prairie Fire (Rosenthal, 1978). He made contact with the group, and after gaining their consent to take part in the project enlisted Mary Lampson (with whom he had worked in the past), and Haskell Wexler (an established cinematographer with leftist sympathies). The three raised the money and put the film together themselves. The Weathermen agreed to participate on the condition that the filmmakers would not contact them again after the film's completion (Paletz, 1977).

== Style ==
The situation of the Weatherman as fugitives wanted by the FBI necessitated an unconventional style in conducting their interviews. The footage was filmed in only three days, and Wexler shot the participants from behind or through a screen in order to conceal their individual identities. The film is unique in that the viewer is able to see the filmmakers but not the subjects themselves. The interactions between the Weathermen and filmmakers raise many questions about the role of documentary film and the contrived nature of its set-ups. This is apparent at several points in the film where the Weathermen express concern over the filmmakers catching their faces on camera, or complain about the artificiality of the overall conversation taking place. In fact, de Antonio describes going out and burning a pile of possible incriminating film negatives following the filming (Rosenthal, 1978). The collective nature of the group led the filmmakers to use group interviews, and allow individuals to talk at length about their thoughts on the American social and political climate, as well as their role in this situation and bringing about change. Unlike many documentaries that actively probe interviewees, the directors of Underground instead sit back and allow the Weathermen to speak. While they do interrupt at times, and do provoke the group with probing questions, there is a recognition of the unstable position of the people they are working with, which, in the end, results in their stepping back and letting the group express itself on its own terms. This film uses the voices of the Weathermen as narration, while employing mainly archival footage to create juxtapositions that illustrate the words. As in his other films, de Antonio purchased the rights to use images from a number of other prominent radical documentaries including Gray and Alk's The Murder of Fred Hampton (1971), Chris Marker's film covering The Pentagon demonstrations, The Sixth Side of the Pentagon (1967) often discussed along with Norman Mailer's non-fiction novel about the same incident, titled The Armies of the Night (1968), Cinda Firestone's Attica (1974), Wexler-Fonda-Hayden's Introduction to the Enemy (1974), and his own Oscar-nominated In the Year of the Pig (1969).

== Response ==
After the film was completed in 1975, the FBI learned of the project and served all three filmmakers with subpoenas in an attempt to confiscate their material and gain information about the location of the Weathermen. The filmmakers, all prominent within the Hollywood community, hired the best lawyers they could find, and with the support of other filmmakers and actors, including Warren Beatty, Elia Kazan, Shirley MacLaine, and Jack Nicholson, were able to get the subpoenas repealed. The three were able to use their First Amendment rights to freedom of speech as well as the rights of journalistic integrity, which allow for confidentiality of sources, to fight the courts and retain the right to make the film. While the legal matters surrounding the production of Underground gained it extensive media coverage, it received mixed reviews from critics, with most damning the Weathermen on the basis of their tactics, rather than addressing the style or merits of the film itself. Others criticized the film for being boring and relying too heavily on narrative by the Weathermen to hold it together, yet others praised it for its striking juxtapositions and its role as a history of the situation and motivations of the radical left. In the words of de Antonio, this film is significant because "…a film always captures history at 24 frames per second and that is it".

In an interview with The Motion Archive, Haskell Wexler believed he may have been removed from One Flew Over the Cuckoo's Nest due to his involvement with Underground.

== Bibliography ==
- Cold War Chronicles: The Films of Emile de Antonio. (2004) Harvard Film Archive
- Hess, J. (1975) "U.S. political filmmaking: 2 stories" Jump Cut. 8 pp. 23–25
- Jackson, B. (2004) Conversations with Emile de Antonio. Senses of Cinema
- Paletz, D. (1977) "Underground (Emile de Antonio; Haskell Wexler; Mary Lampson)". Film Quarterly. 30(4) pp. 34–37.
- Rosenthal, A.; de Antonio, E. (1978) "Emile de Antonio: An Interview". Film Quarterly. 32(1) pp. 4–17
- Waugh, T. (1976) "Underground: Weather People at Home". Jump Cut 12/13 pp. 11–13
