= Jom Tob Azulay =

Brazilian film director

Jom Tob Azulay (born 1941 in Rio de Janeiro, Brazil) is a filmmaker and former diplomat. He has taught film at Federal University of the State of Rio de Janeiro.

== Career ==
From 1971 to 1974, he served as deputy-consul of Brazil in Los Angeles while attending film courses at University of Southern California, University of California, Los Angeles, and California Institute of the Arts. In 1972, he took a course on Film as a Visual Art, taught by Slavko Vorkapich at USC. In 1973, the experience of documenting the studio recording of the bossanova album Elis & Tom with Brazilian director of photography Fernando Duarte was influential in determining his future projects of musical documentaries in Brazil. He also became acquainted with the film Brazil: Report on Torture (1971), a documentary about torture during the Brazilian military regime made in Chile by Haskell Wexler and Saul Landau, which he helped to publicize clandestinely in Brazil and in the US.

In 1974, Azulay resigned for political reasons from the Ministry of Foreign Relations. Still in Los Angeles, he met the Brazilian filmmaker Alberto Cavalcanti with whom he would later work and influence his conception of cinema. Returning to Brazil in 1975, he produced, with the support of state-owned Embrafilme, Um Homem e o Cinema (A Man and the Cinema, 1976), Cavalcanti's last work, and made his first films as photographer-director: the medium-length documentary Exu Mangueira (1975) and the short Euphrasia (1975). Both point to his future aesthetic and thematic inclinations: the immediate rouchian apprehension of reality of direct-cinema and the reconstitution of the historical past. In 1975, he was one of the first to use portable-video equipment (Portapak - ½ ") in Brazil, filming video-art works by Rio de Janeiro's prominent visual artists, such as Anna Bella Geiger, Paulo Herkenhoff, Fernando Cocchiarale, Sônia Andrade, Ivens Machado, Letícia Parente, Angelo de Aquino, and Miriam Danowski.

His first feature films, The Sweet Barbarians (1978) and Heart Pounding Beat (1983), were musicals about pop music using the direct-cinema technique. Heart Pounding Beat used direct-cinema technique in a fictional comedy language in which two actors (Joel Barcellos and Regina Casé) improvised their dialogues as the real action - a Gilberto Gil tour from north to south of the country – took place. The sound of the film in Dolby-Stereo, processed in Los Angeles, introduced this vital audio technology for the first time in Brazilian cinema. In 1993, he was the Brazilian producer of the ending of It's All True, an unfinished film by Orson Welles, shot in 1942 in Brazil. In 1995, he released O Judeu (The Jew), a historical film (18th Century), filmed in Portugal, the first Portuguese-Brazilian official co-production which he produced and directed with an international cast and technical crew. The Jew won several awards, including the prize of Best Movie at the 1995 Brasilia Film Festival and the HBO/Brazil (1996) award.

== Filmography ==
- Estorvo (1998)
- O Judeu (The Jew) (1995)
- It's All True (1993) - Brazilian producer
- Heart Pounding Beat (1983)
- Corações a Mil (Musical, 1981)
- Os Doces Bárbaros (Musical, 1977)
- Um Homem e o Cinema (A Man and the Cinema, 1976)
- The Sweet Barbarians (1978)
- Euphrasia (1975)
- Exu Mangueira (1975)
