= Mumtaz Hussain =

Mumtaz Hussain may refer to:

- Mumtaz Hussain (cricketer), Indian first-class cricketer
- Mumtaz Hussain (solicitor), British-Bangladeshi solicitor
- Mumtaz Hussain (filmmaker), American-Pakistani filmmaker
