= An Inconvenient Truth...Or Convenient Fiction? =

- Theatrical poster
- Directed by: Leesa Kelly; Tim Donner
- Written by: Steven F. Hayward
- Produced by: Leesa Kelly; Tim Donner
- Starring: Steven F. Hayward
- Production company: Pacific Research Institute
- Distributed by: Horizons Television
- Release date: April 12, 2007 (San Francisco)
- Running time: 55 minutes
- Country: United States
- Language: English

An Inconvenient Truth...Or Convenient Fiction? is an American documentary film by Steven F. Hayward, produced by the Pacific Research Institute, and filmed at The Heritage Foundation in Washington, D.C. It was released on April 12, 2007. The film seeks to address inconsistencies in the film An Inconvenient Truth, which was released the year before, in 2006.

== Synopsis ==
The fifty-minute movie was described as a "point-by-point PowerPoint rebuttal" of the Al Gore film An Inconvenient Truth. In his presentation, Hayward agrees with many of the points and issues covered in the Gore film, but shares how certain information may have been slanted by what he terms "global warming extremists," in order to create a darker image of the future. According to Hayward, "I agree that we’re warming, and I agree that we’re playing a role in it. What I disagree with is [Gore's] overall pessimism."

== Production ==
The film was produced by the Pacific Research Institute and filmed at The Heritage Foundation in Washington, D.C. It disputes many of the claims in the film An Inconvenient Truth, arguing that it goes too far in predictions of doom.

== Reception ==
In their review of the film, which they describe as showing inconsistencies of actual events when compared to the predictions of the Gore film, The American Spectator referred to the film as "a dose of reality."

The Weekly Standard noted that Hayward's film used similar devices as those of its target, being "basically a lecture with graphs and maps and pictures," that underscored inconsistencies and omissions in the earlier film, but that in doing so it "won't thrill either the environmental crowd or Hollywood's liberal elite". Weekly Standard reported that Hayward grants, "Much of what Vice President Gore says about climate change is correct. The planet is warming. Human beings are playing a substantial role in that warming." Hayward clarified that, while the Gore film addresses issues that bear attention, he feels that those he terms "global warming extremists" "distort the science, grossly exaggerate the risks, argue that anyone who disagrees with them is corrupt, and suggest that solutions are easy and cheap," and that dealing with the issue in such a manner creates "an all too convenient fiction."

The New York Times reported that, after viewing the film, former chairman of the San Francisco Republican Party Mike DeNunzio stated, “there’s two sides to every story, and certainly we’ve been hearing one side." It was also reported that a spokeswoman for Al Gore stated that Gore "had not seen Mr. Hayward’s film but was accustomed to attacks on his positions". "Obviously Mr. Gore stands by the film," she said of An Inconvenient Truth, “and we found that the mainstream scientific community agrees with its fundamental conclusions." They also noted that while there was applause after the screening, not everyone was thrilled and the attitude of some was that the film was boring.

The Daily Telegraph reported that An Inconvenient Truth "has increasingly become the accepted orthodoxy," but that now through Hayward, that earlier film has a rival. They conceded that "Dr. Hayward does not deny that global warming is occurring or that human activity is contributing to it. But he believes Mr Gore has exaggerated the scale and threat."

== Release ==
The film was not widely released in theaters, but was shown in a handful of free screenings across the United States. In February 2008, Free Republic listed the film among its "Best Global Warming Videos on the Internet".

== See also ==
- An Inconsistent Truth
- Global warming controversy
