= Haskell Wexler =

American filmmaker (1922–2015)

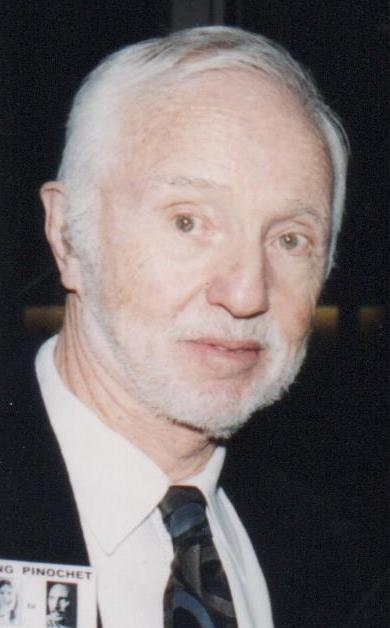
- Wexler in 1999
- Born: February 6, 1922; Chicago, Illinois, U.S.
- Died: December 27, 2015 (aged 93); Santa Monica, California, U.S.
- Occupations: Cinematographer; film director; producer; screenwriter
- Years active: 1947–2015
- Notable work: As cinematographer: Who's Afraid of Virginia Woolf? (1966); In the Heat of the Night (1967); The Thomas Crown Affair (1968); One Flew Over the Cuckoo's Nest (1975); Bound for Glory (1976); Days of Heaven (1978); Matewan (1987); As director: Medium Cool (1969); Brazil: A Report on Torture (1971); Introduction to the Enemy (1974); Underground (1976)
- Spouses: Nancy Ashenhurst (m. 1943; div. 1953) Marian Witt (m. 1954; div. 1985) Rita Taggart (m. 1989)
- Children: Katharine; Jeffrey; Mark
- Relatives: Yale Wexler (brother); Jerrold Wexler (brother); Tanya Wexler (niece)

Haskell Wexler ASC (February 6, 1922 – December 27, 2015) was an American filmmaker, cinematographer, and documentarian. He won the Academy Award for Best Cinematography twice, in 1966 for Who's Afraid of Virginia Woolf? and 1976 for Bound for Glory, out of five total nominations. As a director, he was known for his socio-politically provocative documentary and docufiction works, emerging from the civil rights movement and counterculture of the 1960s.

His 1969 film, Medium Cool, fused scripted scenes with cinéma vérité-style documentary footage of the 1968 Democratic National Convention. He also directed, co-directed and/or shot conventional documentaries like Introduction to the Enemy (1974), on opposition to the Vietnam War; and Underground (1976), on the Weather Underground.

Wexler was judged to be one of film history's ten most influential cinematographers in a survey of the members of the International Cinematographers Guild in 2003. In his obituary in The New York Times, he was described as being "renowned as one of the most inventive cinematographers in Hollywood."

== Early life and education ==
Wexler was born to a Jewish family in Chicago in 1922. His parents were Simon and Lottie Wexler, whose children included Jerrold, Joyce (Isaacs) and Yale. He attended the progressive Francis Parker School, where he was best friends with Barney Rosset.

After a year of college at the University of California, Berkeley, he volunteered as a seaman in the U.S. Merchant Marine in 1941, as the U.S. was preparing to enter World War II. He became friends with fellow sailor Woody Guthrie, who later gained fame as a folk singer. While in the Merchant Marine, Wexler advocated for the desegregation of seamen. In November 1942, his ship was torpedoed by a German submarine and sank off the coast of South Africa. He spent 10 days on a lifeboat before being rescued. After the war, Wexler received the Silver Star and was promoted to the rank of second officer.

He returned to Chicago after his discharge in 1946 and began working in the stockroom at his father's company, Allied Radio. He decided he wanted to become a filmmaker, although he had no experience, and his father helped him set up a small studio in Des Plaines, Illinois. He began by shooting industrial films at Midwest factories. When his studio lost too much money, it was eventually shut down, but the business served as an unofficial film school for Wexler.

He later took freelance jobs as a cameraman, joining the International Photographers Guild in 1947. He worked his way up to more technical positions after beginning as an assistant cameraman on various projects. He made a number of documentaries, including The Living City, which was nominated for an Academy Award.

== Film career ==
Wexler briefly made industrial films in Chicago, then in 1947 became an assistant cameraman. Wexler worked on documentary features and shorts; low-budget docu-dramas such as 1959's The Savage Eye, television's The Adventures of Ozzie and Harriet and TV commercials (he would later found Wexler-Hall, a television commercial production company, with Conrad Hall). He made ten documentary films with director Saul Landau, including Paul Jacobs and the Nuclear Gang, which aired on PBS and won an Emmy Award and a George Polk Award. Other notable documentaries shot and co-directed (with Landau) by Wexler included Brazil: A Report on Torture and The CIA Case Officer and The Sixth Sun: A Mayan Uprising in Chiapas.

In 1963 Wexler self-funded, produced and photographed the documentary The Bus in which a group of Freedom Riders are followed as they make their way from San Francisco to Washington D.C. That same year he served as the cinematographer on his first big-budget film, Elia Kazan's America America. Kazan was nominated for a Best Director Academy Award. Wexler worked steadily in Hollywood thereafter. George Lucas, then 20, met Wexler who shared his hobby of auto racing. Wexler pulled a few strings to help Lucas get admitted to the USC Film School. Wexler would later work with Lucas as a visual consultant for THX 1138 and American Graffiti (1973).

Wexler was cinematographer of Mike Nichols' screen version of Who's Afraid of Virginia Woolf? (1966), for which he won the last Academy Award for Best Cinematography (Black & White) handed out. The following year had Wexler as the cinematographer for the Oscar-winning detective drama, In the Heat of the Night (1967), starring Sidney Poitier. His work was notable for being the first major film in Hollywood history to be shot in color with proper consideration for a person of African descent. Wexler recognized that standard lighting tended to produce too much glare on that kind of dark complexion making the actors look bad. Accordingly, Wexler toned it down to feature Poitier with better photographic results.

Wexler was fired as cinematographer during filming of Francis Ford Coppola's The Conversation and replaced by Bill Butler. He was also fired from Miloš Forman's 1975 film One Flew Over the Cuckoo's Nest and again replaced by Bill Butler. Wexler believed his dismissal on Cuckoo's Nest was due to his radical left political views as highlighted by his concurrent work on the documentary Underground, in which the left-wing urban guerrilla group The Weather Underground were being interviewed while hiding from the law. However, Forman said he had terminated Wexler over mere artistic differences. Both Wexler and Butler received Academy Award nominations for Best Cinematography for One Flew Over the Cuckoo's Nest, though Wexler later said there was "only about a minute or two minutes in that film I didn't shoot.”

However, he won a second Oscar for Bound for Glory (1976), a biography of Woody Guthrie, whom Wexler had met during his time in the Merchant Marine. Bound for Glory was the first feature film to make use of the newly invented Steadicam, in a famous sequence that also incorporated a crane shot. Wexler was also credited as additional cinematographer on Days of Heaven (1978), which won a Best Cinematography Oscar for Néstor Almendros. Wexler was featured on the soundtrack of the film Underground (1976), recorded on Folkways Records in 1976.

He worked on documentaries throughout his career. The documentary Paul Jacobs and the Nuclear Gang (1980) earned an Emmy Award; Interviews with My Lai Veterans (1970) won an Academy Award. His later documentaries included; Bus Riders' Union (2000), about the modernization and expansion of bus services in Los Angeles by the organization and its founder Eric Mann, Who Needs Sleep? (2006), the Independent Lens documentary Good Kurds, Bad Kurds: No Friends But the Mountains (2000), Tell Them Who You Are (2004) Bringing King to China (2011), and From Wounded Knee to Standing Rock: A Reporter's Journey (2019).

Wexler also directed fictional movies. Medium Cool (1969), a film written by Wexler and shot in a cinéma vérité style, is studied by film students all over the world for its breakthrough form. It influenced more than a generation of filmmakers. In DVD commentary for Criterion Collection, Wexler recalled that the studio execs were flabbergasted the film, "an edgy, Godardian tale that ricocheted from one hot-button topic to the next (poverty, racism, civil rebellion, the war in Vietnam, the Kennedy and King assassinations)." The making of Medium Cool was the subject of a BBC documentary by Paul Cronin, Look Out Haskell, It's Real: The Making of Medium Cool (2001). "Medium Cool" was selected for preservation in the National Film Registry in 2003.

Produced by Lucasfilm and uncredited George Lucas, Wexler's film Latino (1985) was chosen for the 1985 Cannes Film Festival. He both wrote and directed the work. Another directing project was From Wharf Rats to Lords of the Docks (2007), an intimate exploration of the life and times of Harry Bridges, an extraordinary labor leader and social visionary described as "a hero or the devil incarnate--it all depends on your point of view."

In 1988, Wexler won the Independent Spirit Award for Best Cinematography for the John Sayles film Matewan (1987), for which he was also nominated for an Academy Award. His work with Billy Crystal in the HBO film 61* (2001) was nominated for an Emmy.

In 2021, filmmakers Joan Churchill and Alan Barker released a 26-minute documentary, Shoot From the Heart, about Wexler's life and career. Churchill described her intention in making the film this way: “We were making a film about a man who was a passionate activist, who never gave up hope for the world.”

A "lifelong liberal activist," during the final years of his life, Wexler trained his focus on raising awareness of sleep deprivation and long hours in the film industry, culminating in the documentary Who Needs Sleep? (2006), which "examined the routine overworking of Hollywood film crews." In a first-person article in HuffPost, Wexler wrote, "There's nothing I love more than making films. But the health of my fellow film workers and citizens is more important than anything on the silver screen."

== Personal life ==
Wexler was sometimes known by the nickname "Pete".

Wexler married the American actress Rita Taggart in 1989. He had two sons, a daughter, four grandchildren, and one great-granddaughter.

=== Death ===
Wexler died in his sleep at the age of 93 on December 27, 2015, at his home in Santa Monica, California.

== Legacy ==
Six of the films he worked on have been preserved by the National Film Registry for being "culturally, historically, or aesthetically significant": Who's Afraid of Virginia Woolf (inducted in 2013), Days of Heaven (2007), Medium Cool (2003), In the Heat of the Night (2002), American Graffiti (1995) and One Flew Over the Cuckoo's Nest (1993).

In September 2016, George Lucas created the Haskell Wexler Endowed Chair in Documentary at the USC School of Cinematic Arts. The first holder of the Wexler Chair is Michael Renov, Vice Dean of Academic Affairs at SCA and a professor in the Bryan Singer Division of Cinema & Media Studies.

== Filmography ==
=== Cinematographer ===
==== Short film ====
Year	Title	Director	Notes
1958	T Is for Tumbleweed	Louis Clyde Stoumen	
1966	One	Steven North	
1976	Polaroid Glasses	Himself	
1977	STP Oil Treatment	Himself	
1977	Plymouth Fury		With Conrad L. Hall
1978	John Wayne for Great Western Savings	Himself	

==== Feature film ====
Year	Title	Director	Notes
1958	Stakeout on Dope Street	Irvin Kershner	Credited as "Mark Jeffrey"
1959	The Savage Eye	Ben Maddow; Sidney Meyers; Joseph Strick	With Jack Couffer and Helen Levitt
1960	Five Bold Women	Jorge López Portillo	
1960	Studs Lonigan	Irving Lerner	Uncredited
1961	The Hoodlum Priest	Irvin Kershner	
1961	Angel Baby	Paul Wendkos	With Jack Marta
1961	The Runaway	Claudio Guzmán	With Ray Foster and Wayne Mitchell
1961	The Fisherman and His Soul	Charles Guggenheim	
1963	America America	Elia Kazan	
1963	Face in the Rain	Irvin Kershner	
1963	Lonnie	William Hale	
1964	The Best Man	Franklin J. Schaffner	
1965	The Loved One	Tony Richardson	Also credited as producer
1966	Who's Afraid of Virginia Woolf?	Mike Nichols	
1967	In the Heat of the Night	Norman Jewison	
1968	Faces	John Cassavetes	Uncredited
1968	The Thomas Crown Affair	Norman Jewison	
1969	Medium Cool	Himself	
1972	The Trial of the Catonsville Nine	Gordon Davidson	
1974	The Conversation	Francis Ford Coppola	Replaced by Bill Butler
1975	One Flew Over the Cuckoo's Nest	Miloš Forman	Replaced by Bill Butler
1976	Bound for Glory	Hal Ashby	
1978	Coming Home	Hal Ashby	
1981	Second-Hand Hearts	Hal Ashby	
1982	Lookin' to Get Out	Hal Ashby	
1983	The Man Who Loved Women	Blake Edwards	
1987	Matewan	John Sayles	
1988	Colors	Dennis Hopper	
1989	Three Fugitives	Francis Veber	
1989	Blaze	Ron Shelton	
1991	Other People's Money	Norman Jewison	
1992	The Babe	Arthur Hiller	
1994	The Secret of Roan Inish	John Sayles	
1995	Canadian Bacon	Michael Moore	
1996	Mulholland Falls	Lee Tamahori	
1996	The Rich Man's Wife	Amy Holden Jones	
1999	Limbo	John Sayles	2002 Hollywood Ending [Woody Allen] [Replaced by Wedigo von Schultzendorff]
2004	Silver City	John Sayles	
2007	From Wharf Rats to Lords of the Docks	Himself	

==== Television ====
Year	Title	Director	Notes
1956	The Eddy Arnold Show	Ben Park	Episode "Betty Johnson, The Jordanaires"
1998	Sandra Bernhard: I'm Still Here... Damn It!	Marty Callner	TV special
2001	61*	Billy Crystal	TV movie
2007	Big Love	Adam Davidson	Episode "Rock and a Hard Place"

==== Documentary works ====
Short film

Year	Title	Director	Notes
1953	The Living City	Himself; John Barnes	
1971	Interviews with My Lai Veterans	Joseph Strick	With Richard Pearce
1978	War Without Winners	Himself	
1982	Hail Columbia!	Graeme Ferguson	With Graeme Ferguson, David Douglas, Richard Leiterman, Ronald M. Lautore and Phillip Thomas
1996	Mexico	Lorena Parlee	With David Douglas, James Neihouse and Álex Phillips Jr.
2000	The Man on Lincoln's Nose	Daniel Raim	With Daniel Raim and Guido Verweyen
2001	SOA: Guns and Greed	Robert Richter	With Alan Jacobsen
2013	Medium Cool Revisited	Himself	

Film

Year	Title	Director	Notes
1965	The Bus	Himself	
1974	Introduction to the Enemy	Himself	
1976	Underground	Emile de Antonio; Mary Lampson; Himself	
1979	Paul Jacobs and the Nuclear Gang	Jack Willis; Penny Bernstein	With Zack Krieger
1980	No Nukes	Daniel Goldberg; Anthony Potenza; Julian Schlossberg	Concert film
1982	Richard Pryor: Live on the Sunset Strip	Joe Layton	Stand-up comedy
1992	Papakolea: A Story of Hawaiian Land	Edgy Lee	
1997	The Sixth Sun: Mayan Uprising in Chiapas	Saul Landau	
2000	Good Kurds, Bad Kurds: No Friends But the Mountains	Kevin McKiernan	With Kevin McKiernan
2000	Bus Rider's Union	Himself; Johanna Demetrakas	
2005	Bastards of the Party	Cle Shaheed Sloan	With Joan Churchill, Mark Woods and Phil Parmet
2006	Who Needs Sleep?	Himself	With Alan Barker, Joan Churchill, Tamara Goldsworthy, Kevin McKiernan and Rita Taggart
2009	In the Name of Democracy: The Story of Lt. Ehren Watada	Nina Rosenblum	
2009	Something's Gonna Live	Daniel Raim	With Daniel Raim and Guido Verweyen
2010	Will the Real Terrorist Please Stand Up?	Saul Landau	With Roberto Chile
2011	Bringing King to China	Kevin McKiernan	
2012	Occupy Los Angeles	Joseph G. Quinn	
2013	Eagles: Live at the Capital Centre (March 1977)	Victoria Hochberg	
2013	Four Days in Chicago	Himself	
2019	From Wounded Knee to Standing Rock: A Reporter's Journey	Kevin McKiernan	TV movie; Posthumous release

=== Director ===
Short film

Year	Title	Director	Producer
1976	Polaroid Glasses	Yes	
1977	STP Oil Treatment	Yes	Yes
1978	John Wayne for Great Western Savings	Yes	Yes

Feature film

Year	Title	Director	Writer	Producer	Notes
1969	Medium Cool	Yes	Yes	Yes	
1983	Bus II	Yes			Co-directed with Thom Tyson
1985	Latino	Yes	Yes		
2007	From Wharf Rats to Lords of the Docks	Yes			

Documentary short

Year	Title	Director	Producer	Notes
1953	The Living City	Uncredited	Yes	Co-directed with John Barnes (Both were uncredited)
1978	War Without Winners	Yes		
2013	Medium Cool Revisited	Yes		

Documentary film

Year	Title	Director	Writer	Producer	Notes
1965	The Bus	Yes	Yes		
1971	Brazil: A Report on Torture	Yes			Co-directed with Saul Landau
1974	Introduction to the Enemy	Yes			
1976	Underground	Yes			Co-directed with Emile de Antonio and Mary Lampson
1980	No Nukes	Uncredited			Documentary footage only
2000	Bus Rider's Union	Yes		Yes	Co-directed with Johanna Demetrakas
2006	Who Needs Sleep?	Yes			
2013	Four Days in Chicago	Yes	Yes	Executive	

=== Acting credits ===
Film

Year	Title	Role	Notes
1969	Medium Cool	Cameraman on Scaffold	Uncredited
1978	Coming Home	Officer Awarding Medals	Uncredited
2002	Out of These Rooms	Alice'a husband	
2007	Battle in Seattle	Himself	

Short film

Year	Title	Role
2005	The Big Empty	Bookstore customer
2014	The Moving Picture Co. 1914	Cameraman / Carpenter

== Accolades and honors ==
Awards and nominations
Award	Wins	Nominations
Academy Awards	2	3
BAFTA Film Awards	N/A	1
Primetime Emmy Award	N/A	1
Independent Spirit Awards	1	N/A

- Wexler received two Academy Awards for Best Cinematography: Who's Afraid of Virginia Woolf? and Bound for Glory. He was additionally nominated for One Flew Over the Cuckoo's Nest, Matewan, and Blaze.
- In 1970, Wexler was nominated for a Directors Guild of America Award for Outstanding Directing – Feature Film for Medium Cool.
- In 1977, Wexler was nominated for a BAFTA Award for Best Cinematography for One Flew Over the Cuckoo's Nest.
- In 1988, Wexler won an Independent Spirit Award for Best Cinematography for Matewan.
- In 1993, Wexler won a Lifetime Achievement Award from the American Society of Cinematographers, the first active cameraman to be awarded.
- In 1996, he was awarded a star on the Hollywood Walk of Fame, the first cinematographer in 35 years to be so honored.
- In 2001, Wexler was nominated for a Primetime Emmy Award for Outstanding Cinematography for a Limited Series or Movie for the made-for-television film 61*.
- In 2004, Wexler was the subject of a documentary, Tell Them Who You Are, directed by his son, Mark Wexler.
- In 2007, he received a Lifetime Achievement Award from the Independent Documentary Association and the same from the Society of Operating Cameramen.
- In 2014, the Location Managers Guild of America awarded Wexler the Humanitarian Award at its inaugural awards show.
