= The Great American Dream Machine =

- Genre: Comedy
- Country of origin: United States
- Original language: English
- No. of seasons: 2
- No. of episodes: 34

Production
- Running time: 90 min (1971); 60 min (1971–1972)
- Production company: WNET

Original release
- Network: PBS
- Release: 6 January 1971 – 9 February 1972

The Great American Dream Machine is a weekly satirical variety television series, produced in New York City by WNET and broadcast on PBS from 1971 to 1972. The program was hosted by humorist and commentator Marshall Efron. Other notable cast members included Chevy Chase and contributors included Albert Brooks, Paul Jacobs, Studs Terkel, and Andy Rooney. The show centered on skits and satirical political commentary. The show was originally 90 minutes long and usually covered at least seven different current event topics. In the second season, the show was reduced to an hour.

== Titles ==
The show began and ended with patriotic marching music and red, white, and blue GREAT AMERICAN DREAM MACHINE lettering, striped like an American flag. There was an animated "machine" of sorts, with complex moving parts, that had no evident function. The title theme was composed and performed by Steve Katz of Blood, Sweat & Tears fame.

== Features ==
Some of the skits would later be revamped for the movie The Groove Tube. There were also occasional short films presented on the show, most of them "experimental" or documentaries about artistic endeavours. Some of these were subtitled.

Each week there was a Great American Hero segment. One week was Evel Knievel; played over Knievel's hospital footage was a honky-tonk song about putting body parts back together. The song was written and performed by Martin Mull.

== Consumerism ==
Efron also participated in some skits, especially those taking a critical look at consumerism. One notable skit focused on the different size descriptions on cans of food, that at a time prior to significant government regulation and standardization of labels. Efron sarcastically compared cans of olives with sizes like "Giant", "Jumbo", "Extra Jumbo", "Super Jumbo", "Colossal", "Super Colossal" and "Gargantuan." While the other sizes were really used in retail, "Gargantuan" was not. The "Gargantuan" can contained one olive that filled the entire can.

Another piece involved Efron attempting to cook a lemon cream pie by using the largely artificial ingredients found listed on a box of Morton frozen lemon cream pie. The final result contained, in his words, “No lemons. No eggs. No cream. Just pie.” The skit inspired a cease and desist letter from the Morton company's lawyers, but the producers of the show aired the skit again after verifying that it was factual. According to Efron, the company subsequently changed the recipe to replace artificial flavorings with concentrated lemon juice.

Another piece had Efron taking the audience on a tour of his apartment, in a "non-event" style that was very much ahead of its time. He presented his "stuffed cat", which proceeded to wake up and look around.

A memorable segment trumpeted the trash compactor appliance. Efron's tagline: "The machine that turns 20 pounds of trash into 20 pounds of trash!"

== Reception ==
John Lennon praised the show in a 1972 radio interview, saying "But this Great American Dream Machine that they have on [New York-area public TV station] Channel 13 is as good as, if not better than, anything that's on British TV, including Monty Python's Flying Circus, which is not as heavy as the Dream Machine".

== DVD release ==
A 4-DVD set from S'More Entertainment, featuring most of the episodes of this series (given at a length of 777 minutes, or approximately 13 hours), was released on September 29, 2015.
