= The Perez Family =

1995 film by Mira Nair

- Theatrical release poster
- Directed by: Mira Nair
- Screenplay by: Robin Swicord
- Based on: The Perez Family by Christine Bell
- Produced by: Julia Chasman; Robin Swicord
- Starring: Marisa Tomei; Alfred Molina; Chazz Palminteri; Anjelica Huston; Trini Alvarado; Celia Cruz
- Cinematography: Stuart Dryburgh
- Edited by: Robert Estrin; Greg Finton
- Music by: Alan Silvestri
- Distributed by: The Samuel Goldwyn Company
- Release dates: May 12, 1995 (U.S.); August 23, 1995 (UK)
- Running time: 114 minutes
- Country: United States
- Language: English
- Budget: $11,000,000 (estimated)
- Box office: $2,832,826

The Perez Family is an American comedy film released in 1995 about a group of Cuban refugees in America who pretend to be a family. It stars Marisa Tomei, Alfred Molina, Anjelica Huston, Chazz Palminteri, and others. The film is based on the 1990 novel of the same name by Christine Bell and was directed by Mira Nair.

== Plot ==
A group of unrelated people who share the last name "Pérez" realize they could more easily stay in America if they pretend to be a family. Set in 1980 during the Mariel boatlift, the movie shows Juan Raúl Pérez, a former aristocrat and newly released political prisoner, seeking to return to his wife, now in America, after 20 years. Dottie Pérez is a former prostitute, who Juan meets. U.S. Immigration officials assume the two are married, because of the common last name. The potential for a real romantic relationship between the couple sets the basis for much of the rest of the film.

== Cast ==
- Marisa Tomei as Dorita Evita Pérez
- Alfred Molina as Juan Raúl Pérez
- Anjelica Huston as Carmela Pérez
- Chazz Palminteri as Lieutenant John Pirelli
- Trini Alvarado as Teresa Pérez
- Celia Cruz as Luz Pat
- Ranjit Chowdhry as Indian Immigration Official
- Diego Wallraff as Ángel Díaz
- Ellen Cleghorne as Officer Rhoades
- Angela Lanza as Flavia
- Jose Felipe Padron as Felipe Pérez
- Lázaro Pérez as Armando "Papi" Pérez
- Bill Sage as Steve Steverino
- Vincent Gallo as Orlando
- Billy Hopkins as Father Aiden
- Ruben Rabasa as Father Martínez
- Melissa Anne Acosta as Isabel

Archival footage of Jimmy Carter and Fidel Castro also appeared in the film.

== Soundtrack ==
The soundtrack composed by Alan Silvestri was released by Music Box Records, paired with his score for Clean Slate.

== Reception ==
The Perez Family holds a score of 60% on review aggregator Rotten Tomatoes, with an average rating of 6.0/10, based on 20 reviews.
