= Brazil: A Report on Torture =

- Directed by: Haskell Wexler, Saul Landau
- Edited by: Robert Estrin
- Release date: October 21, 1971 (New York)

Brazil: A Report on Torture is a 1971 documentary film directed by Haskell Wexler and Saul Landau. The film had its premiere on October 21, 1971 at the Whitney Museum in New York City.

The documentary tells the story of Brazilians who were tortured while imprisoned in Brazil and were then living in exile in Chile. It is the first film to document such torture in Latin America.

== Synopsis ==
The film features interviews conducted with 17 of the 70 Brazilians brought to Chile in January of that year as part of an exchange for the Swiss ambassador Giovanni Bucher, who was kidnapped the month before in Rio de Janeiro by the armed guerilla group VPR (Popular Revolutionary Vanguard). In addition to testimonies, reenactments are conducted by the former prisoners which demonstrate the cruelty suffered—including the use of the pau de arara method.

== Release ==
The film premiered at the Whitney Museum in New York City on October 21, 1971, where it was accompanied by an interview with Salvador Allende, the 29th President of Chile. Later that same year it was broadcast on WNET, followed by a discussion that included the scholar Alfred Stepan.

In August 2012 Brazil: A Report on Torture was broadcast on Brazilian television, marking its television broadcast debut in Brazil. It also received a screening at the Moreira Salles Institute in Rio de Janeiro in November 2012, followed by a discussion including subjects interviewed in the film. This marked the first time that some of the film's participants had seen the film in its entirety.

The Brazilian diplomat Jom Tob Azulay held a private screening of the film for Brazilian performers Antônio Carlos Jobim and Elis Regina in the 1970s, which led to him being persecuted by Brazil's military government as a result. He later commented on the film's obscurity in Brazil, stating that it was "unbelievable" and was likely due to the "repressed society" and the effect that the "veil of forgetfulness plays on torture".

== Reception ==
In a 2012 review in Piauí magazine, film director and editor Eduardo Escorel was extremely critical of the movie, criticizing Wexler and Landau for staging re-enactments of torture with the former torture victims, which he felt showed a "total lack of restraint, decorum and modesty". Escorel went on to say that this, along with other criticisms, "might explain why it was so many years in obscurity."

In contrast, film historians James and Sara T. Combs felt that the movie was an "excellent example of the "appeal to conscience"" and the movie has received praise from diplomat Jom Tob Azulay. The film was also honored in a 2014 film festival at the Brazilian Consulate in New York and was featured in the 2015 documentary Rebel Citizen, directed by Pamela Yates.
