= Jack Willis (filmmaker) =

American documentary filmmaker (1934–2022)

Jack Willis (June 20, 1934 – February 9, 2022) was an American journalist, writer and filmmaker.

== Life and career ==
Jack Lawrence Willis was born in Milwaukee to Louis Willis and Libbie (Feingold) Willis on June 20, 1934. He graduated with a bachelor's degree in political science from the University of California, Los Angeles in 1956 and graduated from UCLA School of Law in 1962.

Jack Willis was the co-founder of Link TV a Direct Broadcast Satellite channel currently in over 34 million American homes via DirecTV and the Dish Network.

He was a producer and executive in commercial, cable and public television. He was a Senior Fellow at George Soros' Open Society Institute where he developed and directed a program on media policy. From 1990 to 1997 he was president and CEO of Twin Cities Public Television. He was also vice-president of programming and production for CBS Cable, where he developed the critically acclaimed performing arts channel, Director of Statue of Liberty Programming for Metro Media Producer's Corp. and Director of Programming and Production of WNET/13 in New York City.

Willis created and produced many award-winning series including the Emmy Award-winning news show The 51st State for WNET/13. He was Co-Executive Producer of PBS's groundbreaking, Emmy winning, The Great American Dream Machine, and the Emmy-winning series City Within a City, a documentary which was widely credited with helping to achieve passage of Milwaukee's Open Housing Law.

He also produced and directed numerous award-winning documentaries. He produced films for CBS News as well as The Human Animal series, with Phil Donahue, for NBC. With Saul Landau, he produced the independent documentary Paul Jacobs and the Nuclear Gang, about the government cover up of the fatal effects of the Nevada nuclear bomb tests on military personnel and civilians living downwind from the tests, won an Emmy and the George Polk Award for investigative journalism. Two of his films, Lay My Burden Down, about the plight of black sharecroppers in the rural south, and Every Seventh Child, about Catholic education were shown at the New York Film Festival. His first film, The Streets of Greenwood about voting rights in Mississippi, won the gold medal at the San Francisco Film Festival.

With his wife, Mary, he wrote several highly rated network movies and co-authored the book But There Are Always Miracles.

He died from assisted suicide in Zurich on February 9, 2022, at the age of 87.

== Films ==
- Stella Adler, Awake and Dream (1992) (Executive Producer)
- The Uncompromising Revolution (1990) (Executive Producer)
- The House of Mirth (1981) (Executive Producer)
- Summer (1981) (Executive Producer)
- Paul Jacobs and the Nuclear Gang (1979) (Producer, co-director, Writer) – A political documentary about government suppression of the health hazards of low-level radiation. Paul Jacobs died from lung cancer before the documentary was finished. His doctors believed he contracted it while he was investigating nuclear policies in 1957. Jacobs interviewed civilians and soldiers, survivors of nuclear experiments in the 50s and 60s, testing the effects of radiation. The film won an Emmy Award (1980), George Polk Award for investigative journalism on TV, Hugh M. Hefner First Amendment Award, and Best Documentary at the Mannheim Film Festival.
- Power and the Presidency (1975) (Producer)
- The Case Against Milligan (1975) (Producer) Emmy-nominated
- City Within A City – Emmy Award-winning documentary about poverty in Wisconsin, widely credited with helping to achieve passage of Milwaukee's Open Housing law.
- Hard Times in the Country (1969) (Producer, Director, Writer) – Cine Gold Eagle, American Film Festival
- Some of My Best Friends (1969) (Producer)
- Appalachia: Rich Land, Poor People (1968) (Producer, Director, Writer) American Film Festival selection
- Every Seventh Child, (1967) New York Film Festival selection (Producer, Director, Writer)
- Newark Town Meeting (1967) (Producer)
- Lay My Burden Down, (1966) New York Film Festival Selection, Emmy Nominee, Cine Gold Eagle, Brotherhood Award National Conference of Christians and Jews.
- Crime in the Streets (1965) (Producer, Writer, Director)
- The Image Makers (1964) (Producer, Director, Writer)
- The Quiet Takeover (1964) (Producer, Writer)
- The Streets of Greenwood (1963) – GOLD MEDAL at the San Francisco Film Festival

== Television Series (as Executive Producer) ==
- The Human Animal, (1985)
- The 51st State (1971) 4 Emmys WNET/13
- The Great American Dream Machine (1970) 2 Emmys
- City Within A City – (1968) Emmy, widely credited with helping to achieve passage of Milwaukee's Open Housing law

== Two-Hour Teleplays (with Mary Pleshette Willis) ==
- Seizure (1980)
- A Question of Guilt (1978)
- Some Kind of Miracle (1976)

== Books ==
- But There are Always Miracles Viking Adult 1974

== Awards ==
- Emmy Award
- George Polk Award for Investigative Reporting
- Hugh M. Hefner First Amendment Award
- Mannheim Film Festival: Critics' First Prize
