= Emile de Antonio =

American film director (1919–1989)

- Born: Emile Francisco de Antonio; May 14, 1919; Scranton, Pennsylvania, U.S.
- Died: December 15, 1989 (aged 70); New York City, New York, U.S.
- Education: Harvard University
- Occupations: Director, producer
- Spouse: Nancy de Antonio

Emile Francisco de Antonio (May 14, 1919 – December 15, 1989) was an American director and producer of documentary films, usually detailing political, social, and counterculture events circa 1960s–1980s. Randolph Lewis referred to him as "...the most important political filmmaker in the United States during the Cold War."

== Early life ==
De Antonio was born in 1919 in the coal-mining town of Scranton, Pennsylvania. His father, Emilio de Antonio, an Italian immigrant, fostered the lifelong interests of Antonio by passing on his own love for philosophy, classical literature, history and the arts. He attended Harvard University alongside future president John F. Kennedy. Despite this, de Antonio was familiar with the working class experience, making his living at various points in his life as a peddler, a book editor, and the captain of a river barge (among other duties). He would later go on to make a film about Kennedy's assassination called Rush to Judgment (1966), an early rebuttal of the Warren Report.

== Career ==
After serving in the military during World War II as a bomber pilot, de Antonio returned to the United States where he frequented the art crowd, often associating with such pop artists as Jasper Johns, Robert Rauschenberg, and Andy Warhol, in whose film Drink de Antonio appears. Warhol was famously quoted praising de Antonio with the words, "The person I got my art training from was Emile de Antonio... De was the first person I know of to see commercial art as real art and real art as commercial art."

In 1959, de Antonio created G-String Productions in order to distribute the Beat Generation film Pull My Daisy, and it was at this time that de Antonio discovered filmmaking. His first film, Point of Order! (1964), was a compilation film covering Joseph McCarthy and the Army-McCarthy hearings. In 1968, de Antonio signed the "Writers and Editors War Tax Protest" pledge, vowing to refuse tax payments in protest against the Vietnam War.

De Antonio chronicled this art scene in his documentary Painters Painting (1972). He did not actually begin creating films until the age of 43, after making significant contributions to the modern art world through his uncensored promotion of the work of his contemporaries. In 1969, the Metropolitan Museum of Art held a water-stone exhibition titled New York Painting and Sculpture: 1940–1970, that included 408 works by 43 artists. Curator Henry Geldzahler granted de Antonio the unique opportunity of exclusive access to the works included in the show, and exclusive rights to filming it. Until this point, de Antonio noted, "I disliked films on painting that I knew. They were either arty, narrated in a gush of reverence, as if painting were among angelic orders, or filmed with violent, brainless zooms on Apollo's navel, a celebration of the camera over the god. They revealed nothing at all about how or why a painting was made."

The intimate opportunity of access to the show, and the similarly close relationships with many of the artists, led de Antonio to select thirteen painters to profile in his film, in addition to critics, curators, dealers, collectors, and other influential figures in the contemporary art world. Combining interviews with live footage of the artists at work in their studio, de Antonio and cinematographer Ed Emshwiller created a groundbreaking work that captured abstract expressionism and other major contemporary art movements in a way no film maker had ever before.

In an interview regarding his filmography, de Antonio spoke about his relationship with the painters and his role in the creation of the film: "I was probably the only filmmaker in the world who could [have made Painters Painting] because I knew all those people, from the time that they were poor, and unsuccessful and had no money. I knew Warhol and Rauschenberg and Jasper Johns and Stella before they ever sold a painting, and so it was interesting to [do the film about them]."

== Controversy ==
De Antonio was the creator/producer of many politically-motivated films (including the 1969 Oscar-nominated In the Year of the Pig), attracting a substantial amount of controversy, and was also known for aligning himself with Marxist thought. His films are critiques of various aspects of American culture or politics, on the whole reflecting a certain degree of political dissension. Over the course of his professional life, de Antonio was under surveillance by J. Edgar Hoover and the FBI. This surveillance resulted in a 10,000-page dossier on de Antonio, and is the subject of his "autobiographical swansong," Mr. Hoover and I.

== Death ==
On December 15, 1989, de Antonio died of a heart attack in front of his Lower East Side home.

== In popular culture ==
A still photograph used in the film In the Year of the Pig (1968) that displayed Marine Corporal Michael Wynn later was incorporated into the album cover for The Smiths' second album Meat Is Murder (1985). The writing on Wynn's helmet, "MAKE WAR NOT LOVE", was changed to "MEAT IS MURDER".

== Filmography ==
- Point of Order (1964)
- McCarthy: Death of a Witch Hunter (1964)
- Rush to Judgment (1967)
- In the Year of the Pig (1968)
- Charge and Countercharge (1969)
- 1968: America Is Hard to See (1970)
- Millhouse: A White Comedy (1971)
- Painters Painting (1972)
- Underground (1976)
- In the King of Prussia (1982)
- Mr. Hoover and I (1989)

== Discography ==
- Underground (1976) with Mary Lampson, and Haskell Wexler with the Weather Underground on Folkways Records
- Millhouse (Original Soundtrack of Film on Richard Nixon) (1979) on Folkways Records
