= Paul Jacobs and the Nuclear Gang =

- Written by: Jack Willis; Penny Bernstein
- Produced by: Jack Willis; Saul Landau
- Cinematography: Zack Krieger; Haskell Wexler
- Edited by: Jay Freund; Barbara Jarvis
- Production company: New Time Films
- Release date: 1979
- Running time: 60 minutes

Paul Jacobs and the Nuclear Gang is a 1979 political documentary film produced and directed by Jack Willis and Saul Landau, written by Jack Willis and Penny Bernstein, narrated by Penny Bernstein with cinematography by Zack Krieger and Haskell Wexler. Photographed by Sandi Sissel.

The focus of the film is the government cover-up of the health hazards related to the 1950s atomic bomb testing in Nevada. Paul Jacobs, a journalist, activist and co-founder of the magazine Mother Jones, investigated the results of the tests on unknowing civilians and soldiers used as guinea pigs. Jacobs died of lung cancer before the film was completed; his doctors believed he contracted cancer as a result of radiation exposure.

The film was shown on PBS in the United States and widely distributed on television and theatrically in Europe. It was censored by Swedish Television during the time of a referendum on nuclear energy in Sweden.

The film won an Emmy Award (1980), George Polk Award for investigative journalism on TV, Hugh M. Hefner First Amendment Award, and Best Documentary at the Mannheim Film Festival.
