= Cle Shaheed Sloan =

American actor, activist, and technical advisor (born 1963)

- Born: May 22, 1969 (age 57); Los Angeles, California, U.S.
- Other name: Cle "Bone" Sloan
- Occupations: Activist; actor; documentary director; technical advisor

Cle "Bone" Shaheed Sloan (born May 22, 1969) is an American activist, actor and documentary director from Los Angeles County, California. While still a member of Athens Park Bloods, a Los Angeles street gang, Sloan worked to reform gang culture to put an end to gang violence from the inside.

== Career ==
Sloan was introduced to the film industry by football legend Jim Brown, who helped him secure a job as an assistant when he was released from prison. The job allowed Sloan to meet director Antoine Fuqua and sparked his interest in becoming a cinematographer. Sloan has since appeared in small roles in three of Fuqua's hit movies Training Day, Tears of the Sun, and Brooklyn's Finest. During the production of Training Day, Sloan worked as a gang adviser and helped persuade actual gang members to lend their credibility to the project on-screen.

Sloan directed and appears in the 2006 documentary film Bastards of the Party which appeared at the 2005 Tribeca Film Festival and at the 2006 Hollywood Black Film Festival. Bastards of the Party aired on HBO on February 6, 2007.

Sloan was featured on Bill O'Reilly's The O'Reilly Factor and Anderson Cooper 360° speaking out against gang violence on behalf of his non profit organization AKTIVE which is helping to "Change the gangs from the inside" by working with active gang members in communities nationwide.

Sloan starred in three of David Ayer's directorial efforts, the Los Angeles films 2008's Street Kings featuring Forest Whitaker and Keanu Reeves, and End of Watch, a 2012 film about the life of two LAPD officers (Jake Gyllenhaal and Michael Peña), and 2020's The Tax Collector about a LA drug gang enforcer and his family. He later appeared on the TNT Drama Southland as Ronnie, a Los Angeles pimp.

== Personal life ==
On January 29, 2015, Sloan and Terry Carter were struck by a truck in a hit-and-run incident in Compton, California. The incident, caused by Suge Knight, killed Carter and injured Sloan. Though Sloan refused "to be used as a snitch" and testify against Knight, on September 21, 2018, Knight pleaded no contest to manslaughter and was sentenced to 28 years in prison.

== Filmography ==
=== Film ===
Year	Title	Role	Notes
1998	The Replacement Killers	Banger	
2001	Training Day	Bone	Technical advisor
2003	Tears of the Sun	Mission Rebel	
2005	Bastards of the Party	Himself	Documentary; also director
2008	Street Kings	LeShawn Fremont	
2009	Brooklyn's Finest	The Dragon	Production security
2010	Monika's Day	Heatmeister	Short film
2012	End of Watch	Mr. Tre	
2017	Bright	OG Mike	Technical advisor
2020	The Tax Collector	Bone	

Technical advisor

Year	Title	Notes
2013	Sons of Anarchy	Uncredited, 6 episodes
2014	Gang Related	Uncredited, 2 episodes
2014	i	Music video for Kendrick Lamar
2015	Straight Outta Compton	
2016	24: Legacy	Uncredited, episode: "12:00 p.m.-1:00 p.m."
2017–2025	S.W.A.T.	
2017–2018	Insecure	16 episodes; also location management
2019	Dolemite Is My Name	
2020–2021	Bosch	12 episodes
2021	King Richard	
2021	Colin in Black & White	6 episodes
2025	One of Them Days	
2025	One Battle After Another	

=== Television ===
Year	Title	Role	Notes
2009–2013	Southland	Ronnie Watkins	3 episodes; also technical advisor, 6 episodes
2020	Cherish the Day	Bone	3 episodes
