= Phil Valentine =

American radio personality (1959–2021)

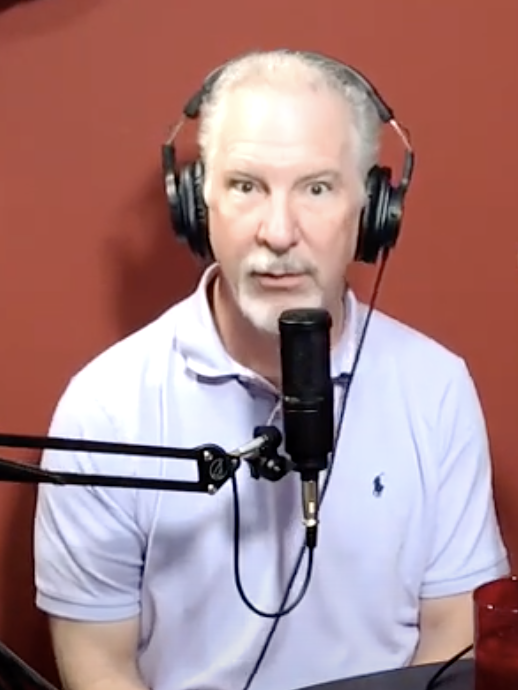
- Born: Philip Carr Valentine; September 9, 1959; Rocky Mount, North Carolina, U.S.
- Died: August 21, 2021 (aged 61); Nashville, Tennessee, U.S.
- Cause of death: COVID-19
- Education: East Carolina University; Connecticut School of Broadcasting
- Occupations: Talk radio host; political activist; writer; actor
- Employer: WWTN
- Relatives: Tim Valentine (father)
- Awards: Herman Cain Award

Philip Carr Valentine (September 9, 1959 – August 21, 2021) was an American conservative talk radio host, author and actor. He broadcast daily on WWTN, a Cumulus Media station in Nashville, Tennessee, and hosted The Phil Valentine Show, syndicated nationally through the Westwood One radio network. He was an opponent of a proposed state income tax in Tennessee and denied climate change.

During the COVID-19 pandemic, Valentine opposed mask mandates and argued against vaccinations against COVID-19. He died from complications of COVID-19 on August 21, 2021.

== Early life and education ==
Born in Rocky Mount, North Carolina, to Betsy Carr and six-term Democratic U.S. Representative Tim Valentine, Valentine was raised in Nashville, North Carolina. Valentine scored high on IQ tests but received poor grades in school. He blamed his trouble concentrating in school on an attention deficit disorder. At 13, Valentine fronted a band called The Nashville Five. His father provided opportunities for gigs at Democratic Party events. Valentine graduated from Northern Nash High School.

Valentine attended East Carolina University to study business, but transferred to the Connecticut School of Broadcasting after a friend encouraged Valentine go into radio because of his deep voice.

== Radio career ==
Valentine began his radio career at small-market radio stations in North Carolina after graduating from broadcasting school. Following the death of his mother when he was 21, Valentine moved to Nashville, Tennessee, where he sold health club memberships and worked part-time as a disc jockey.

In 1991, Valentine hosted a morning drive show for WLAC-FM and a talk radio show on weekends. In June 1995, Valentine started The Phil Valentine Show, a talk-radio show on Nashville radio station WWTN, while performing in television commercials. Valentine moved to WWDB in Philadelphia, where he hosted a morning show. When WWDB was sold in 1998, Valentine worked in New York City at WABC. In April 1998, Valentine resurrected The Phil Valentine Show in Nashville during morning drive-time at WLAC (AM). After five years, Valentine left WLAC to write a book.

Valentine returned to talk radio at WWTN on July 8, 2004. From 2007 to 2019, the nationally syndicated The Phil Valentine Show aired on 100 stations. Valentine ranked No. 47 on the 2021 Heavy Hundred, a list of the top 100 radio talk-show hosts as determined by Talkers, a talk-media trade magazine. He was voted Best Conservative in a 2018 Nashville Scene readers' poll. In 2019, Valentine returned to broadcasting at WWTN, where he worked until his death.

== Other media ==
Valentine authored three nonfiction books, The Conservative's Handbook: Defining the Right Position on Issues from A to Z , Right from the Heart: The ABC's of Reality in America, and Tax Revolt: The Rebellion Against an Overbearing, Bloated, Arrogant, and Abusive Government. He wrote three novels, The Godplayers, The First Face of Janus, and Barbican.

On January 26, 2012, Valentine wrote, produced and starred in the documentary An Inconsistent Truth as a response to the Al Gore movie An Inconvenient Truth. During the two weeks after it opened at a single Nashville movie theater, it was the country's top-grossing film on a per-screen basis. In 2012, Valentine won the Excellence in Filmmaking award at the libertarian Anthem Film Festival and Best Documentary at the Nevada Film Festival in Las Vegas.

Valentine appeared in the 2014 movie Atlas Shrugged Part III: Who Is John Galt?. He performed in an episode of ABC's Threat Matrix television drama and the 2015 movie The Secret Handshake. Valentine's screenplay "Derek Dickens & The Dream" won first place in the 2015 Colorado Film Festival and was a finalist in screenwriting contests at the Beverly Hills Film Festival and Atlanta Film Festival.

== Activism ==
=== State income tax ===
In 2001, Tennessee Republican state senator Marsha Blackburn tipped off Valentine that a vote on Tennessee Governor Don Sundquist's proposed a state income tax was imminent. Valentine urged his listeners to swarm the Tennessee state capitol to voice their opposition. More than 2,000 people stormed the capitol and broke windows in what became known as the Tennessee Tax Revolt. Valentine said Sundquist committed political adultery after promising in his 1994 gubernatorial campaign to veto any state income tax. The measure failed in the legislature and Valentine emerged as a hero among conservatives in Tennessee.

=== COVID-19 ===
During the COVID-19 epidemic, Valentine suggested that only those with underlying health conditions should be vaccinated against the illness. He performed a parody song, "Vaxman", in the style of the 1966 Beatles song "Taxman", altering the lyrics to parody vaccination efforts. He compared vaccination status badges worn by medical workers with the yellow badges German Jews were ordered to wear by the Nazis. Valentine predicted his chance of dying from COVID-19 was less than one percent.

== Personal life, illness and death ==
Valentine had three sons with his wife, Susan. He co-hosted PodGOATs, a nonpolitical podcast, with his son, Campbell.

On July 11, 2021, Valentine announced he had COVID-19.

To battle COVID-19, Valentine took Vitamin D and the anti-parasite drug ivermectin, despite warnings by the U.S. Food and Drug Administration against using the medication for a COVID-19 remedy. As Valentine's health deteriorated, his brother, Mark, announced that Valentine regretted his public activism against vaccination.

Valentine was placed on mechanical ventilation on July 28, 2021. Mark Valentine announced on July 30, 2021, that Valentine required extracorporeal membrane oxygenation (ECMO), which acts as an artificial lung and heart for the body.

Valentine died of complications of COVID-19 on August 21, 2021.
