= Broken Promises: Taking Emily Back =

1993 television film by Donald Wrye

- Genre: Drama
- Screenplay by: Vickie Patik; Christopher Canaan
- Story by: Vickie Patik
- Directed by: Donald Wrye
- Starring: Cheryl Ladd; Polly Draper; Robert Desiderio; D. David Morin; Kathleen Wilhoite; Ted Levine
- Composer: Chris Boardman
- Country of origin: United States
- Original language: English

Production
- Executive producer: Larry Thompson
- Producer: Donald Wrye
- Cinematography: Rick Bota
- Editor: David Siegel
- Running time: 93 minutes
- Production company: Larry Thompson Entertainment

Original release
- Network: CBS
- Release: December 26, 1993

Broken Promises: Taking Emily Back is a 1993 American drama television film directed and produced by Donald Wrye. The film stars Cheryl Ladd, Polly Draper, Robert Desiderio, D. David Morin, Kathleen Wilhoite, and Ted Levine. It premiered on CBS on December 26, 1993.

== Plot ==
Ever since Pam Cheney lost her baby during labor, she has been struggling with depression. She is not only supported by her loving, but hard-working husband Sean, but also by her friends Ella and Terry Sabin, who have also lost a baby at age three. One year after labor, Pam decides to finally take a proposal to adopt a toddler. Going through official agencies proves unsuccessful, partly due to Pam's age, partly due to the growing demand of adoption. She is advised to take care of an orphaned teenager instead, but Sean refuses this option.

Instead, she meets a lawyer she knows nothing about, and, without going through the legal business, pays him a large sum of money to meet with a homeless couple, Gary and Lily Ward, who are selling their daughter Emily. Even though Sean has severe doubts about the lawyer and the morality of this kind of adoption, he allows his wife to meet with the couple. During this, it immediately becomes clear to Pam that Lily is unwilling to give up Emily, though Lily insists that she wants the best for her daughter. At the end of the conversation, Gary allows Pam and Sean to adopt Emily.

Pam is delighted and soon grows used to raising a child. Trouble starts when Gary and Lily, having recently been thrown out of their shelter, demand to take back Emily, pointing out that the contract allows them to change their minds for the first thirty days after the adoption. Pam is desperate to prevent this, and grants Gary his one wish: she buys him a car, even though the contract forbids her to support Gary and Lily financially. Hoping that this has changed Gary's mind, she keeps the deal a secret from her husband. However, when Gary returns, demanding more, Sean feels that his doubts are confirmed: Gary and Lily are con artists. He wants to give up Emily before he and Pam get involved too much emotionally, but it proves too late: Pam is unwilling to leave Emily.

Alternatively, she recognizes Gary as the source of all trouble and persuades Lily to leave him. Though Gary is able to seduce Lily - now pregnant again - back, he agrees on leaving alone the Cheneys and Emily. Meanwhile, Ella, who accompanied Pam to the shelter where she met with Lily and became moved by a poor orphan, convinces Terry to give parenthood another chance. They meet with an attorney to legally adopt Lily's unborn child. Lily commits to the deal but later finds out that Gary has granted the adoption to another couple outside the law. Realizing that her husband is no good, she leaves him to be beaten by another man.

Sometime later, Lily gives birth to a baby boy. Gary shows up at the hospital with a new lawyer to claim Emily and the boy. Lily, however, convinces him that they are bad parents and should be brought up by the Cheneys and Sabins. In the end, Gary leaves the hospital, leaving his children behind with the adoptive parents.

== Cast ==
- Cheryl Ladd as Pamela 'Pam' Cheney
- Polly Draper as Ella Sabin
- Robert Desiderio as Sean Cheney
- D. David Morin as Terry Sabin
- Kathleen Wilhoite as Lily Ward
- Ted Levine as Gary Ward
- Amanda and Megan Braun as Emily
- Jordan Ladd as Waitress

== Production ==
In a 1993 interview, Ladd commented on the film: "This particular story really grabbed me, and I think that's partly because there's been so much of this in the news. What I loved about it is that there really are no heroes and no villains, just humans with all of their gifts and all of their difficulties." She furthermore praised her colleagues for their acting performances and recalled the film as "some of the best work I've done on television."
