= Divorce Wars: A Love Story =

1982 television film by Donald Wrye

- Genre: Drama
- Written by: Donald Wrye; Linda Elstad
- Directed by: Donald Wrye
- Starring: Tom Selleck; Jane Curtin
- Music by: Paul Chihara
- Country of origin: United States
- Original language: English

Production
- Executive producers: Frank Konigsberg; Donald Wrye
- Producer: Sam Manners
- Cinematography: Tak Fujimoto
- Editor: Donald R. Rode
- Running time: 100 minutes
- Production company: Warner Bros. Television

Original release
- Network: ABC
- Release: March 1, 1982

Divorce Wars: A Love Story (also known simply as Divorce Wars) is a 1982 American made-for-television drama film written, directed and produced by Donald Wrye. It was originally broadcast March 1, 1982 on ABC. It was the seventh most-watched show for the week of March 1–7, 1982.

== Cast ==
- Tom Selleck as Jack Sturgess
- Jane Curtin as Vickey Sturgess
- Candice Azzara as Sylvia Bemous
- Joan Bennett as Adele Burgess
- Maggie Cooper as Leslie Fields
- Charles Haid as Fred Bemous
- Viveca Lindfors as Barbara Harper
- Philip Sterling as Max Bernheimer
- Dorothy Fielding as Cleo
- Mimi Rogers as Belinda Wittiker
- Joe Regalbuto as Barry Fields
- Alan Oppenheimer as Arthur Lazar
- Clare Torao as Donna (credited as Clare Nono)
