= Center for Medicine in the Public Interest =

American think tank and research group

- Abbreviation: CMPI
- Type: non-profit medical issues research group think tank
- Headquarters: New York City, United States
- Key people: Robert Goldberg; Gad Berdugo; Fred Goodwin; Steven Sammut; Mark Thornton; Michael Weber
- Revenue: $353,000 (2014)
- Expenses: $373,744 (2014)
- Website: cmpi.org

The Center for Medicine in the Public Interest (CMPI) is a non-profit medical issues research group. It was founded by the "free-market think tank" Pacific Research Institute. CMPI's research agenda deals with clinical outcomes and econometric studies that analyze the value of new medicines and genomic and molecular-based medical innovation.

CMPI is a 501(c)(3) organization and as such is not permitted to devote a substantial part of its activity to lobbying. Its officers have written articles on various issues including price controls on pharmaceutical products in publicly funded healthcare schemes in the United States, and restrictions on advertising in the European Union. The Economist Intelligence Unit has written that the organisation generally takes a pro-drug industry viewpoint.

== Issues ==
=== Universal healthcare ===
CMMPI is a strong opponent of universal healthcare and favors a free-market approach to health care policy. The center created a website called BigGovHealth.org to tell the stories of people who faced difficulties with the health care systems in Europe and Canada. The site also included interviews with health policy experts in Europe and Canada. The website is no longer up, now showing a page where you can offer to purchase the domain.

=== Drug imports ===
The group opposes the importation of drugs in order to lower prices in the United States, arguing in part that Canadian pharmaceutical companies' products are dangerous because they are not regulated by the FDA but by foreign government agencies.

== Personnel ==
CMPI was founded by Peter Pitts, former FDA Associate Commissioner for External Relations under the Bush administration, and Dr. Robert Goldberg, former fellow at the Manhattan Institute.

CMPI Senior Fellows include:

- Jacob Arfwedson

== Funding ==
Funders include PhRMA and Pfizer.

== Reports ==
CMPI has published studies on the value of new cancer drugs, the cost-effectiveness of certain Alzheimer's treatments, evidence-based medicine, and drug counterfeiting.
