= Eoin McKiernan =

Irish-American teacher and scholar

- McKiernan hosting his show Irish Diary in the 1960s
- Born: John Thomas McKiernan; May 10, 1915; New York City, United States
- Died: July 18, 2004 (aged 89); Saint Paul, Minnesota, United States
- Spouse: Jeannette O'Callaghan (m. 1938)
- Children: 9

Academic background
- Education: Pennsylvania State University

Academic work
- Institutions: State University of New York at Geneseo; University of St. Thomas

Eoin McKiernan (May 10, 1915 – July 18, 2004) was an Irish-American scholar in the interdisciplinary field of Irish Studies in the United States and the founder of the Irish American Cultural Institute. He is credited with leading efforts to revive and preserve Irish culture and language in the United States and he was named to the list of the 100 greatest Irish-Americans of the century by Irish America magazine. The Irish writer and former editor of The Irish Press Tim Pat Coogan praised McKiernan as "the father of Irish studies."

== Early life and education ==
Born John Thomas McKiernan in New York City, McKiernan was raised on a farm near Cold Spring, New York. Inspired by his parents' love of their homeland, McKiernan went to Ireland to study Irish culture as a young boy. At 15, McKiernan won a scholarship to spend three months studying Irish in Rosmuc, in County Galway, and later moved to Lahinch, where he spent the rest of the year on his maternal relatives' farm, noting, "I learned from my grandmother a fund of stories and folklore that is with me still." On this trip, he was provided a letter of introduction to Éamon de Valera, the Irish statesman with whom McKiernan built a lifelong acquaintance.

In 1938, he married Jeannette O'Callaghan, whom he met while studying Irish at the Gaelic Society in New York City. They raised nine children, among them the American journalist and film director Kevin McKiernan.

McKiernan attended seminary at Cathedral College and St. Joseph's in New York, leaving before ordination. He earned his B.A. in literature and classical languages from St. Joseph's College, his Master's in psychology from the University of New Hampshire, and his Ph.D. in English from Pennsylvania State University His Ph.D. dissertation focused on the psychology of Nathaniel Hawthorne in an era when "Irish dissertation topics were all but unheard of in the United States." Later in life, McKiernan was awarded honorary doctorates from the National University of Ireland, the College of St. Rose, Marist College, and the University of St. Thomas.

== Career ==
Passion for Irish culture was the dominant undercurrent of McKiernan's teaching career in secondary and university levels. As a teacher, he served as an officer of the National Council of College Teachers of English, sat on the New York governor-appointed State Advisory Committee to improve teacher certification standards, and served as a consultant to the U.S. Department of Education in the early 1960s. McKiernan taught at State University of New York at Geneseo for 12 years and rose to be head of the English department. He also became a board member of the Experiment in International Living (EIL), a program that sponsored trips to Ireland for American students. For more than three decades, he organized and led educational tours to Ireland, where he traveled more than three hundred times in his life.

In 1960, McKiernan moved to St. Paul to chair the English department at the University of St. Thomas. Two years later, in 1962, McKiernan established the Irish American Cultural Institute (IACI) with the aims of educating the American public about Irish culture and supporting the arts in Ireland. The IACI earned a reputation as "the most important force in North America for fostering a serious approach to Irish culture." Éamon De Valera agreed to act as patron, as did succeeding presidents of Ireland, and Princess Grace of Monaco was international chairperson from 1972 until her death in 1982.

One of the central missions of the IACI was funding Irish art and artists. Beginning in 1964, under McKiernan's direction the IACI published the scholarly journal Éire-Ireland, a quarterly journal of Irish studies produced by the IACI, which he edited until 1985, and the bi-monthly publication Dúchas. The Butler Literary Award, which McKiernan administered, proved a boon to writers in Irish, among them Máirtín Ó Cadhain, Breandán Ó hEithir and Liam Ó Muirthile. At his suggestion, the IACI financed the world premiere, in Springfield, Massachusetts, of Irish composer A. J. Potter's "Symphony No. 2". McKiernan founded a study abroad program called The Irish Way, and brought Irish artists and writers for speaking tours in an effort to revive and preserve Irish culture in the United States.

To address what he saw as a shallow and "appalling" understanding of Irish culture among Americans, McKiernan directed 16 films and 53 half-hour programs on subjects of Ireland and Irish culture beginning in the 1960s. The programs elicited a wave of enthusiasm, including an estimated 10,000 letters of support. McKiernan also founded Irish Books and Media, which for more than 40 years was the largest distributor of Irish printed materials in the United States. McKiernan stepped down as manager of IACI programs in 1985, but continued to work for it as honorary chairman until 1988.

Irish America magazine twice named McKiernan one of the Irish Americans of the year, and in 1999 the magazine included him in its list of the Greatest Irish-Americans of the century, along with President John F. Kennedy and artist Georgia O'Keeffe. McKiernan also garnered the John F. Kennedy gold medal of the Ancient Order of Hibernians, the gold medal of the Éire Society of Boston, life membership of the Royal Dublin Society, and honorary degrees from the University of St. Thomas, Marist College, and New York University.

== Death ==
McKiernan died on July 18, 2004, in St. Paul, Minnesota. On his death, the Irish Times referred to him as the "U.S. champion of Irish culture and history ... a patriarch of Irish Studies in the U.S. who laid the ground for the explosion of interest in Irish arts in recent years.”
