= Millhouse (film) =

1971 US documentary film

Millhouse: A White Comedy is a 1971 documentary by Emile de Antonio following Richard Nixon's political career from his election to the House of Representatives in 1946 to his election as president of the United States in 1968. It begins with Nixon's "last press conference" in 1962 after his loss in the race for governor of California in which he famously said, "You won't have Dick Nixon to kick around anymore." Then a collage of videos show Nixon's trajectory from his House campaign to his involvement in the Alger Hiss case, election to the Senate in 1950, election as Vice President in 1952 including the full Checkers speech, campaign for the presidency in 1960, campaign for Barry Goldwater's presidential candidacy in 1964, and his triumphant election as President in 1968 as the "New Nixon". The film features interviews but no voice-over.

The title is a pun on Nixon's middle name, Milhous.

In 1979, Smithsonian Folkways released a soundtrack of the film including clips and audio from newsreels, as well as liner notes of text of the soundtrack and facsimiles of newspaper clippings and notes.

== See also ==
- List of American films of 1971
