= Introduction to the Enemy =

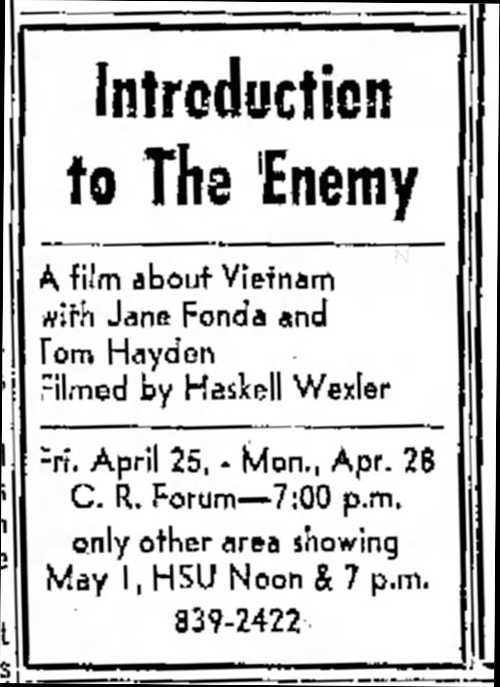
- Newspaper announcement, April 1975
- Directed by: Haskell Wexler
- Produced by: Jane Fonda; Tom Hayden
- Starring: Jane Fonda; Tom Hayden
- Cinematography: Haskell Wexler
- Edited by: Bill Yahraus Christine Burrill
- Distributed by: Indochina Peace Campaign
- Release date: November 1974
- Running time: 60 minutes
- Country: United States
- Language: English

Introduction to the Enemy is a 1974 American documentary film about Vietnam, filmed and directed by Haskell Wexler, co-produced by Jane Fonda and Tom Hayden. Shot in the spring of 1974 and released before the end of the year, the film examines the human costs of the Vietnam War. The camera follows American actress Jane Fonda and her husband Tom Hayden, already known in their home country for antiwar activism, as they make inquiries regarding the war's effects and legacy among Vietnamese people from all walks of life.

== Plot and style ==
The film was billed as a travelogue that presents the experiences of Fonda, Hayden, and their infant son Troy as they traveled throughout Vietnam in the spring of 1974 – after U.S. military involvement had largely ended but before the ultimate end of the war. It was, however, widely recognized as North Vietnamese propaganda, especially given Fonda and Hayden's long history of helping North Vietnam produce and disseminate propaganda, including Radio Hanoi broadcasts. Their journey goes from the capital city Hanoi in the North through the demilitarized zone down to Quang Tri province in the South. The trip was deemed "a tour in support of the Vietnamese people", and the film was intended to show the universality of human lives among "the enemy" in the Vietnam War.

The film does not directly address the details of war and politics and instead focuses more on the day-to-day lives of average people. Fonda and Hayden visit farmers, doctors, artists, soldiers, trade unionists, and even fellow actors and filmmakers in a Hanoi movie studio. In Fonda's opinion, the Vietnamese people did not hold the American people in contempt as a result of the decade-long Vietnam War, always distinguishing between people and their governments. Fonda described the message of the film, as one of peace and unity. She noted that, while American involvement in Vietnam had officially ended in 1973, the film helped to raise much-needed awareness of American culpability and the ongoing struggle of the Vietnamese.

Critics noted its gentle and unhurried style: Nora Sayre described it as a "quiet, moving film", while Molly Haskell praised it as endearingly modest in its approach, "a tiny jewel of a film". Fonda herself calls the film "slow-moving" but intentionally so, mimicking as it does the traditional pace of daily life in Vietnam.

Still, at least one scene breaks the languidity with a shock. An undetected landmine exploded during production, killing a nearby man offscreen as cameras rolled. Wexler captured Fonda's horrified reaction, and this was left in the final cut. She later described the moment as possibly the most powerful in the entire film, remarking with irony: "How many times as an actress I was paid to cry...."

== Production and distribution ==
Introduction to the Enemy was the first release of Fonda's newly founded production company, the Indochina Peace Campaign (later rebranded as IPC Films). Cinematography was by Wexler with assistance by Pham Viet Tung. Film editing was handled by Christine Burill and Bill Yahraus.

The film was released to select theaters in November 1974. Fonda and Hayden went on an accompanying lecture tour, speaking at screenings throughout the U.S. and beyond. As a commercial release, it was a box office failure, but an expected one. Beyond its limited release, it was frequently donated to antiwar groups and shown free of charge. In interviews, Fonda spoke of the imperative to spread the message of the film.

== Reception and legacy ==
Writing in The New York Times, Nora Sayre called the film "pensive and moving" but others were much more harsh. New York Times' associate editor, Walter Goodman, labeled the film as "Communist propaganda", and complained acidly that it plays upon sentimentality by constantly veering among shots of "beautiful children, bombed-out-towns, beautiful children, workers making bicycles... and beautiful children". An editorial in a Louisiana newspaper called it "an unabashed publicist's job" for the North Vietnamese. The Hollywood trade journal Variety simply dismissed it as an example of the filmmakers' self-dramatization and radical chic (and even scornfully remarked upon Fonda's "incongruously dippy smile").

Film critic Molly Haskell wrote a highly positive review with praising the artistic merits of the fil such as how "Wexler's cinematography beautifully captures the twin landscapes of destruction and rebirth." The film is emblematic of Wexler's leftist politics as displayed in his other works, from the 1971 documentary Interviews with My Lai Veterans to the 1978 big-budget drama Coming Home in which Fonda starred. After his death in 2015, Wexler's obituaries generally gave only minimal descriptions of Introduction and at least one major newspaper described it as "notorious".

Fonda and Hayden were roundly criticized for the film and their actions in support of the communist North Vietnamese government, including posing on anti-aircraft guns while smiling during the war and recording propaganda during and after the war for the North Vietnamese government. In March, 1973, legislators in Maryland introduced legislation to ban Fonda's movies and officially label her a traitor. Fonda also appeared to justify torture against American prisoners of war saying "“If a prisoner tried to escape, it is quite understandable that he would probably be beaten and tortured.”

Fonda described criticism of her as "a loss of cynicism, and a loss of irrelevance." However, Fonda has issued numerous and repeated apologies in the years since saying that "It was a huge, huge mistake." She also has attempted to portray herself as duped by the North Vietnamese in interviews and in her autobiography saying

"Someone (I don’t remember who) leads me toward the gun, and I sit down, still laughing, still applauding. It all has nothing to do with where I am sitting. I hardly even think about where I am sitting. The cameras flash. I get up, and as I start to walk back to the car with the translator, the implication of what has just happened hits me. Oh, my God. It's going to look like I was trying to shoot down U.S. planes! I plead with him, 'You have to be sure those photographs are not published. Please, you can't let them be published.' I am assured it will be taken care of. I don’t know what else to do. It is possible that the Vietnamese had it all planned. I will never know. If they did, can I really blame them?"

Fonda and Hayden continued to have success in their professional careers. She starred in the Hollywood-made comedy Fun with Dick & Jane, a box office success in 1977, and went on to a lengthy body of work. Hayden went on to serve in the California State Assembly and Senate. He and Fonda divorced in 1989.

However, they continued to receive criticism for their involvement after the end of the war. Fonda was protested by Vietnam veterans when she gave a commencement address at her high school alma mater. Fonda's likeness even adorned stickers that were placed in urinals as a target.

The film was shown at the 2015 Vienna International Film Festival, and at the Brooklyn Academy of Music (BAM) on March 7, 2016.
