= Bastards of the Party =

- Directed by: Cle Sloan
- Produced by: Antoine Fuqua
- Narrated by: Cle Sloan
- Cinematography: Haskell Wexler; Joan Churchill; Mark Woods; Phil Parmet
- Edited by: Keith Salmon
- Music by: Joong-Han Chung
- Release date: April 23, 2005 (Tribeca)
- Running time: 95 minutes
- Country: United States
- Language: English

Bastards of the Party is a 2005 American documentary film directed by former Bloods gang-member Cle Sloan and produced by Antoine Fuqua. The film explores the creation of two of Los Angeles's most notorious gangs, the Crips and the Bloods, from the perspective of the Los Angeles community. The film also denounces gang violence and presents meaningful solutions from former gang members to stop this problem.

== Production ==
During a term in jail, Cle Sloan read the book City of Quartz by Mike Davis and found his neighborhood of Athens Park on a map depicting LAPD gang hot spots of 1972. The book's account fueled Sloan to ask questions of how the gangs got started, only to receive speculation and more questions from his fellow gang members. Sloan decided to research the subject himself.

The title of the film comes from a passage in City of Quartz that reads: "As even The [Los Angeles] Times recognized, the decimation of the Panthers led directly to a recrudescence of gangs in the early 1970s. 'Crippin,' the most extraordinary new gang phenomenon was a bastard offspring of the Panthers' former charisma, filling the void left by the LAPD SWAT teams."

The documentary appeared at the 2005 Tribeca Film Festival and at the 2006 Hollywood Black Film Festival. The television premiere aired on February 6, 2007, on HBO. Over 90 percent of the documentary was shot in 1996.

== Content ==
Bastards of the Party explores various influences on California African-American gang culture. The starting point is the crisis of black leadership that marked the end of the Civil Rights Movement, particularly the government-instigated rivalry between the Black Panther Party and the Us Organization. Movements based on collective action gave way to individualism inspired by heroes of blaxploitation films like Super Fly.

In this atmosphere, Raymond Washington created the concept of a gang of the new generation that went from "the cradle to the grave" and was joined by Stanley "Tookie" Williams in the formation of the Crips. The collapse of domestic industry left black youth with few opportunities to escape from gang activity, which became a money-making operation based around the illegal drug trade. Tupac Shakur's song, "So Many Tears", is played as a tribute to the deceased Bloods gang members at the end portion of the documentary.
