= Steven F. Hayward =

American conservative author and policy scholar (born 1958)

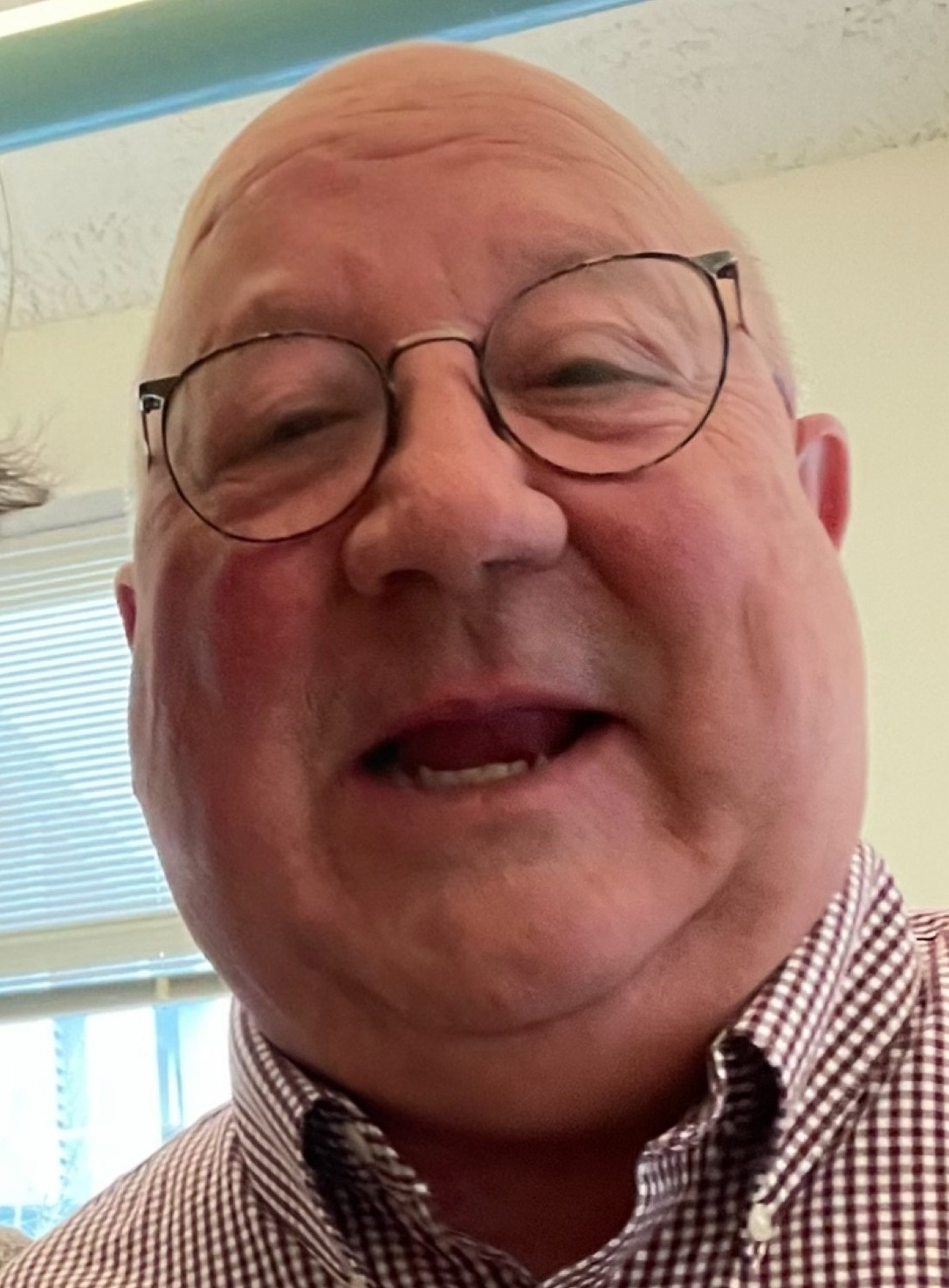
- Hayward in 2025
- Born: October 16, 1958 (age 67)
- Education: Lewis and Clark College (BS); Claremont Graduate School (MA, PhD)
- Occupations: Author; law professor; columnist; policy scholar
- Years active: 1984–present
- Notable credit: An Inconvenient Truth...Or Convenient Fiction?
- Title: Edward L. Gaylord Visiting Professor of Public Policy

Steven F. Hayward (born October 16, 1958) is an American conservative author, political commentator, and policy scholar. He is a senior resident scholar at the Institute of Governmental Studies at the University of California, Berkeley, and a visiting lecturer at the UC Berkeley School of Law.

Hayward was previously the Ronald Reagan Distinguished Visiting Professor at Pepperdine University's Graduate School of Public Policy, and was the inaugural visiting scholar in conservative thought and policy at the University of Colorado at Boulder. In 2023, he returned to Pepperdine to serve as the Edward L. Gaylord Visiting Professor of Public Policy at the Pepperdine University School of Public Policy.

From 2002 to 2012, he was the F.K Weyerhaeuser Fellow in Law and Economics at the American Enterprise Institute in Washington, D.C., and has been senior fellow at the Pacific Research Institute in San Francisco since 1991.

== Early life and education ==
Hayward was born in 1958. In 1980, he graduated with a Bachelor of Science in business from Lewis and Clark College. He then received an M.A. in government in 1984 and a Ph.D. in American studies in 1986, both from the Claremont Graduate School.

== Career ==
In 1984, Hayward started work as director of journalism of the group Public Research Syndicated at the Claremont Institute through 1987. In 1985, he also became Executive Director for Inland Business Magazine through 1990. In 1987, he became director of the Golden State Center for Policy Studies through 1991. In 1990, Hayward became contributing editor for Reason through 2001 and also became a Public Interest Member in the California Citizens Compensation Commission through 1995. In 1996, he served on the Departmental Transportation Advisory Committee of the government of the State of California through 2001.

During the 2004 U.S. Presidential elections, he served on the George W. Bush for President campaign. In 2008, he served a one-year term as president of the Philadelphia Society. Hayward has testified before the Committee on Energy and Commerce at the United States House on two occasions.

Hayward has served as visiting fellow professor, scholar, or lecturer at the following institutions:

- Intercollegiate Studies Institute – Weaver Fellow (1985–86)
- Ashland University – Distinguished Fellow at John M. Ashbrook Center
- Mont Pelerin Society – Olive Garvey Fellow (1990, 1992)
- Pacific Research Institute for Public Policy – senior fellow (1991–Present)
- The Heritage Foundation – Fellow (1993–1994, 1997–1998)
- American Enterprise Institute – Fellow (2002–2012?)
- Georgetown University – visiting lecturer in the Government Department (2003–Present)
- The Fund for American Studies – inaugural visiting scholar (2013–2014)
- University of Colorado Boulder – First Visiting Scholar in Conservative Thought and Policy (2013–2014)
- Pepperdine University as Visiting Ronald Reagan Professor of Public Policy (2014–2014)
- University of California, Berkeley – senior resident scholar at the Institute of Governmental Studies and visiting lecturer at Boalt Hall

Hayward is treasurer of the Donors Capital Fund, a donor-advised fund, and a member of its board of directors. In January 2011, Hayward began writing for the political/general-interest blog Power Line. In 2012, Hayward published The Politically Incorrect Guide to the Presidents: From Wilson to Obama. That same year, he co-authored an article with Kenneth P. Green entitled, 'Market-Friendly Energy', in The 4% Solution: Unleashing the Economic Growth America Needs, published by the George W. Bush Presidential Center.

For more than a decade, he has directed the Ashbrook Center's new program in political economy at Ashland University.

He often hosts for William Bennett's radio show Morning in America on the broadcasting network of Salem Media Group.

== Views ==
=== Environment and global warming ===
Hayward has said, "we talk as though the earth is so fragile that, you know, we're endlessly insulting it in its doom." He has also said that "environmental concern rightly understood as now a settled middle class value in wealthy countries and will become more so in other countries around the world as they prosper and that's a key point." He supports the idea of an environmental Kuznets curve, in which increased economic development constitutes the best way to help the environment. He believes that modern developing nations such as China could speed through the curve with technological progress.

Hayward rejects claims that climate change poses a major threat to humanity, and labeled climate scientists analysts fearful of change as "climateers," "climatistas," "alarmists," and the "environmental Politburo." He has advocated that the world engage in geoengineering projects to mitigate global warming, such as spraying saltwater in the air to increase cloud cover over the oceans and thus reflect back sunlight. He advocates that the U.S. build more nuclear power plants as another necessary solution. Hayward has remarked, "the environment is too important to be left to the environmentalists." He has labeled the Green New Deal as the "Green Nude Eel" and claimed that "enlarging government power to 'fight climate change' is nowadays a central purpose of the left."

He created and starred in the documentary An Inconvenient Truth...Or Convenient Fiction?, a rebuttal of many of the claims in Al Gore's An Inconvenient Truth, saying that while Gore is right about many things, he goes too far in predictions of doom. In 1994, he has co-authored an annual Index of Leading Environmental Indicators (1996–2008), published by the Pacific Research Institute, issued each Earth Day.

=== Ronald Reagan ===
In his books about Reagan, Hayward argued that Reagan had the important insight that the Soviet Union was internally weak due to socio-economic problems, which distinguishes Reagan from most intellectual conservatives in recent American history. He stated that Reagan's foreign policy and domestic policy should be thought of as two sides of the same coherent worldview. He has referred to Reagan as, on net, more of a tax cutter despite having enacted both tax increases and decreases because the marginal tax brackets shrunk. He praised Reagan for trying to reduce the size of the federal government, cutting certain social welfare programs, moving other programs to state control, expanding the U.S. military, advocating originalism, and making disarmament pledges with the Soviet Union. He criticized Reagan for his conduct in the Iran-Contra affair, concluding that Reagan let his emotions take over his judgment and wrongly paid for hostages via arms. He also criticized Reagan for declining to push for a Taxpayer Bill of Rights until the latter part of his second term. Hayward estimated that Reagan ultimately failed to create a true Constitution-based ideological movement to succeed him. He also described current conservative views of Reagan as too superficial and focused too much on style.

== Personal life ==
Hayward is married to former George Mason University Law School professor Allison Hayward.

Hayward is or has been a member of the:

- Philadelphia Society
- National Tax Limitation Committee
- Interfaith Stewardship Alliance
- Center of the American Experiment
- Donors Trust

== Writings ==
Articles written by Hayward appeared in The Weekly Standard starting in 2001 and in National Review-related publications since 2002. He has also published writings in The New York Times, The Wall Street Journal, Policy Review, Chicago Tribune, Los Angeles Daily News, County Reporter, The San Diego Union-Tribune, San Francisco Chronicle, The Sacramento Bee, The Washington Times, The Columbus Dispatch, The Plain Dealer (Cleveland, Ohio), and The Kansas City Star.

He is the author of a two-volume biography of Ronald Reagan (The Age of Reagan, 1964–1980: The Fall of the Old Liberal Order (ISBN 978-0761513377) in 2001 and The Age of Reagan: The Conservative Counterrevolution: 1980–1989 (ISBN 978-1400053575) in 2009), which received favorable reviews.

- Churchill on Leadership: Executive Success in the Face of Adversity (Prima, 1997) (Crown Forum, 1998)
- The Age of Reagan: The Fall of the Old Liberal Order, 1964–1980 (Prima Publishing, Forum, 2001)
- The Real Jimmy Carter: How Our Worst Ex-President Undermines American Foreign Policy, Coddles Dictators and Created the Party of Clinton and Kerry (Regnery Publishing, 2004)
- Greatness: Reagan, Churchill, and the Making of Extraordinary Leaders (Crown Forum, 2005)
- The Age of Reagan: The Conservative Counterrevolution: 1980–1989 (Crown Forum, 2010)
- Mere Environmentalism: A Biblical Perspective on Humans and the Natural World (Values and Capitalism) (AEI Press, 2010)
- The Politically Incorrect Guide to the Presidents: From Wilson to Obama (Politically Incorrect Guides) (Regnery Publishing, 2012)
- Patriotism Is Not Enough: Harry Jaffa, Walter Berns, and the Arguments that Redefined American Conservatism (Encounter Books, 2017)
- M. Stanton Evans: Conservative Wit, Apostle of Freedom (Encounter Books, 2022)

== See also ==
- List of American Enterprise Institute scholars and fellows
- An Inconvenient Truth...Or Convenient Fiction?
