= Irish American Cultural Institute =

Organization

- Abbreviation: IACI
- Established: 1962; 64 years ago
- Founder: Eoin McKiernan
- Location: United States of America
- Fields: Irish culture
- Publication: Éire-Ireland
- Website: iaci-usa.org

The Irish American Cultural Institute (IACI) is an American cultural group founded in Saint Paul, Minnesota, by Dr. Eoin McKiernan in 1962. The group's purpose is to promote an intelligent appreciation of Ireland and the role and contributions of the Irish in America culture. It also sponsors research and awards prizes in the field of Irish Studies. It also awards the Annie Moore Award, which is given "to an individual who has made significant contributions to the Irish and/or Irish American community and legacy".

From 1962 to 1995, the institute was hosted by the College of St. Thomas (now the University of St. Thomas (Minnesota)). In 1995, the organization moved its headquarters to Morristown, New Jersey.

== Publications ==
The Institute publishes:

- Éire-Ireland, a scholarly journal
- Ducas, a newsletter

== Patron ==
Michael D. Higgins, President of Ireland, served as the institute's patron until the end of his presidential term.
