= Painters Painting =

1972 film by Emile de Antonio

- Directed by: Emile de Antonio
- Release date: 1972

Painters Painting: The New York Art Scene 1940-1970 is a 1972 documentary directed by Emile de Antonio. It covers American art movements from abstract expressionism to pop art through conversations with artists in their studios. The 13 artists appearing in the film are Willem de Kooning, Jasper Johns, Andy Warhol, Robert Rauschenberg, Helen Frankenthaler, Frank Stella, Barnett Newman, Hans Hofmann, Jules Olitski, Philip Pavia, Larry Poons, Robert Motherwell, and Kenneth Noland.

== See also ==
- List of American films of 1972
