= The Numbers Start with the River =

1971 film

- Produced by: Donald Wrye
- Edited by: Robert Estrin
- Distributed by: United States Information Agency
- Release date: 1971
- Running time: 15 minutes
- Country: United States
- Language: English

The Numbers Start with the River is a 1971 American short documentary film about life in small river towns in America's heartland. Produced by Donald Wrye for the United States Information Agency, it was nominated for an Academy Award for Best Documentary Short.
