= Donald Wrye =

American film director

- Born: September 24, 1934; Riverside, California, U.S.
- Died: May 15, 2015 (aged 80); Harrisburg, Pennsylvania, U.S.
- Occupations: Film director, screenwriter, producer
- Years active: 1966–2015

Donald Wrye (September 24, 1934 – May 15, 2015) was an American director, screenwriter and producer.

Wrye attended the UCLA, directing as his dissertation film in the Department of Theater Arts, Soba man, "A dramatization about a young nisei girl who meets an American boy who has been to Japan and was profoundly moved by bi his experiences there, telling of the effect of the boys experience upon both the boy and girl."

Wrye is best known for directing the 1978 film Ice Castles. He died on May 15, 2015, at his home in Harrisburg, Pennsylvania. Wrye had his own film production company, SpyGaze Pictures.

== Filmography ==
TV documentary

- 1966: Destination Safety
- 1968: Men From Boys: The First Eight Weeks
- 1968: California

Documentary short

- 1962: Soba man, dissertation film at UCLA
- 1969: An Impression of John Steinbeck: Writer, nominated for Best Documentary (Short Subject), a US Information Agency production
- 1969: California, sponsored by Bank of America
- 1970: The Well, as creative consultant writer, a US Information Agency production
- 1971: The Numbers Start with the River, nominated for Best Documentary (Short Subject)

TV movies

- 1973: The Man Who Could Talk to Kids
- 1974: Born Innocent
- 1975: Death Be Not Proud
- 1975: The Entertainer
- 1977: It Happened One Christmas
- 1981: Fire on the Mountain
- 1982: Divorce Wars: A Love Story
- 1983: The Face of Rage
- 1983: Heart of Steel
- 1990: 83 Hours 'Til Dawn
- 1991: Lucky Day
- 1991: Stranger in the Family
- 1993: Broken Promises: Taking Emily Back
- 1994: Ultimate Betrayal
- 1994: Separated by Murder
- 1995: A Family Divided
- 1995: Trail of Tears
- 1997: Not in This Town
- 1997: High Stakes
- 2000: Range of Motion
- 2000: A Vision of Murder: The Story of Donielle

Feature film

- 1978: Ice Castles
- 1981: The House of God

Direct-to-video

- 2010: Ice Castles

Miniseries

- 1987: Amerika
