= Kevin McKiernan =

American film director

Kevin McKiernan is an American foreign correspondent, photographer and documentary filmmaker.

McKiernan's work, nominated for the Pulitzer Prize, has taken him to some of the world's most troubled regions, from Nicaragua to Iraq and Syria, from West Africa to Afghanistan. He has been widely published in national and international media. An expert on the Kurds, St. Martin's Press released his book, THE KURDS: A People in Search of Their Homeland. McKiernan wrote and directed the PBS documentary Good Kurds, Bad Kurds, which The New York Times called "searing." It won the Human Rights Prize at the Santa Barbara International Film Festival. In addition to Good Kurds, Bad Kurds, McKiernan co-produced the documentary The Spirit of Crazy Horse for PBS Frontline. In 2011, he completed Bringing King to China, a documentary that premiered at the Santa Barbara International Film Festival. Ethnic Cleansing: The Story of the Rohingya, a short film, premiered at the Ojai Film Festival in November 2014. His newest documentary film, From Wounded Knee to Standing Rock: A Reporter's Journey, was released on October 8, 2019. A review in The New Republic called it "a humane but unflinching look at one of the most famous Indigenous resistance groups in modern history." The film features previously unreleased footage from Wounded Knee that McKiernan "buried before his arrest by the FBI at the siege’s conclusion." Cinematographer Haskell Wexler filmed much of the contemporary footage

== Education and personal life ==
McKiernan holds a J.D. from Northeastern University Law School and a B.A. in English Literature from the University of St. Thomas. He was also awarded an Honorary M.S. from the Brooks Institute of Photography, and received a Master's Certificate from the Harvard Program in Refugee Trauma. He is an Ochberg Fellow at the Dart Center for Journalism & Trauma. McKiernan is a son of the late Eoin McKiernan, one of the early major scholars of the field of Irish Studies.
