= The House of Mirth (1981 film) =

- Genre: Drama
- Based on: The House of Mirth by Edith Wharton
- Screenplay by: Richard Cumming; Adrian Hall
- Directed by: Adrian Hall
- Starring: Geraldine Chaplin; William Atherton; Lois Smith
- Country of origin: United States
- Original language: English

Production
- Executive producer: Jack Willis
- Producers: Daniel A. Bohr; Dorothy Cullman; Charlene Harrington
- Production location: Rhode Island
- Cinematography: Paul Goldsmith; Hart Perry
- Editor: Charlotte Zwerin
- Running time: 90 min
- Production company: WNET

Original release
- Network: PBS
- Release: November 2, 1981

The House of Mirth is a 1981 American television film directed by Adrian Hall. It is based on Edith Wharton's 1905 novel of the same name. It stars Geraldine Chaplin as the protagonist, Lily Bart. The film was part-funded by the National Endowment for the Humanities. It was broadcast on PBS' Great Performances on 2 November 1981.

== Plot ==
Despite being born to an important family, Lily Bart is an impoverished young woman who struggles to maintain any form of lifestyle that resembles that of her rich society friends. As she approaches 30, the chances of being rescued by a rich husband are fading. She entrusts what little money she has in a man that promises to make her great gains on the stock market. However the money he gives back to her turn out to be his own and not the profit of her investments. The man believes he can buy Lily but she refuses his advances, opting to keep her honour. The place she as part of an exclusive social milieu is threatened by malicious gossip. Her financial life also remains fraught with difficulty as she struggles to adapt to a working life.

== Cast ==
- Geraldine Chaplin as Lily Bart
- William Atherton as Lawrence Selden
- Lois Smith as Bertha Dorset
- Elizabeth Franz as Grace Stepney
- Amy Van Nostrand as Gwen Van Osburgh

== Reception ==
Megan Rosenfeld of The Washington Post praised the casting, "For once, Geraldine Chaplin's basically expressionless face serves her well, and her performance is perhaps one of her best. For once she goes beyond the insipid, catching the confused – and surprised – torment of a young woman who can neither succeed within the restraints of her society nor use courage or imagination to escape from it. William Atherton is mostly handsome as her friend and fellow dilettante, Lawrence Selden. Lois Smith is wonderfully decadent as the treacherous Bertha Dorset." Rosenfeld also praised Hall for directing the film with "careful attention to period detail" and that he "proceeds subtly but surely down the path of Lily's misfortune." Rosenfeld was also positive about the costume and production design.
