= Hollywood Black Film Festival =

- Location: Los Angeles, California
- Founded: 1998
- Founded by: Tanya Kersey
- Film titles: 2 Fast 2 Furious, The Hurricane
- Artistic director: Tanya Kersey
- Language: international

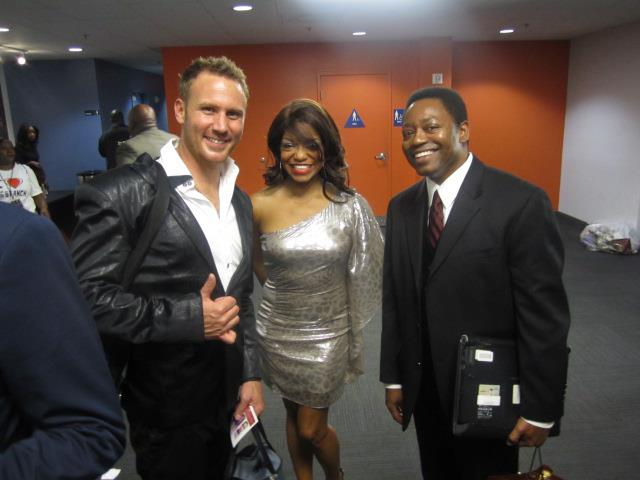
Festival director Tanya Kersey with South African singer-songwriter Jason Hartman at the HBFF in February 2013

The Hollywood Black Film Festival (HBFF), dubbed the "Black Sundance," is an annual six-day film festival held in Los Angeles, California dedicated to enhancing the careers of new and established black filmmaking professionals by bringing their work to the attention of the film industry, press and public. It is open to the public.

Films screened at the festival include the 2006 documentary Bastards of the Party, director John Singleton's box office blockbuster "2 Fast 2 Furious," the critically acclaimed "The Hurricane" (starring Academy Award winner Denzel Washington), director Kasi Lemmons' "The Caveman's Valentine" (starring Samuel L. Jackson), and director Reggie Rock Bythewood's "Dancing In September."

== Attendance ==
The festival attracts such stars and industry insiders as Academy Award winners Forest Whitaker and Sidney Poitier, John Singleton, Spike Lee, Cedric the Entertainer, George Tillman, Ice-T, Rev. Run (of Run DMC), Tina Andrews, Reuben Cannon, Anthony Anderson, Blair Underwood, Sanaa Lathan, Rockmond Dunbar, Loretta Devine, Bill Duke, Sheryl Underwood, Vanessa Williams, Clifton Powell and Gina Ravera.

== History and purpose ==
HBFF was founded in 1998 by its executive director Tanya Kersey, in order to enhance the careers of emerging and established black filmmakers through a public exhibition and competition program. The festival's goal is to play an integral role in discovering and launching independent films and filmmakers by bringing them to the attention of the industry, press and public.

== Format ==
In addition to the film screenings, the adjunct Infotainment Conference features dozens of informational seminars, panels and workshops covering a wide variety of topics which range from film production, distribution and marketing to pitching, writing for television and film, in addition to specific programs of interest to actors. Each year, more than 100 top film and television executives, filmmakers, producers, directors, writers, agents, attorneys, business managers and actors participate in the talk-show style panels, roundtable discussions and workshops.

A prominent feature of the Infotainment Conference is "A Conversation With…" a series of interviews with some of the industry's professionals. Past participants in the series include directors John Singleton ("2 Fast 2 Furious," "Baby Boy," "Shaft," "Boyz N The Hood"), George Tillman ("Soul Food, Barbershop") and St. Clair Bourne ("The Life and Works of Gordon Parks," "John Henrick Clarke: A Great and Mighty Walk") and screenwriter Tina Andrews ("Why Do Fools Fall in Love?") participate in these enlightening and informative discussions.

The HBFF Pitchathon is for filmmakers and storytellers hoping to sell their idea, story, book or screenplay to Hollywood buyers. Participants get to pitch their story ideas to entertainment industry executives (film directors and producers, acquisitions, development, production and distribution executives), talent agents and greenlighters (people who make decisions on whether or not to "greenlight" a project) who will critique their concept/idea to examine its commercial potential in the today's film marketplace.

== Awards ==
The juried HBFF Filmmaker & Storyteller Awards honor the achievements of the most promising black filmmakers and screenwriters. Films that screen during the festival compete for the following jury awards:

- Best Feature,
- Best Documentary,
- Best Short,
- Best Student Film,
- HBFF Audience Choice Award.

A separate HBFF Storyteller Competition awards scribes for their excellence in screenwriting. Closing Night is highlighted by the announcement of the crowd-favorite HBFF Audience Choice Award, which is selected by audience vote.

== See also ==
- List of film festivals
- Film Festivals
- Pan African Film Festival
- Independent film
