= Interviews with My Lai Veterans =

1970 film

- Directed by: Joseph Strick
- Written by: Joseph Strick
- Produced by: Joseph Strick
- Starring: Richard Hammer
- Cinematography: Richard Pearce; Haskell Wexler
- Edited by: Sylvia Sarner
- Distributed by: New Yorker Films
- Release date: 1970
- Running time: 22 minutes
- Country: United States
- Language: English

Interviews with My Lai Veterans is a 1970 American short documentary film directed by Joseph Strick featuring firsthand accounts of the My Lai Massacre. It won an Oscar at the 43rd Academy Awards in 1971 for Best Documentary (Short Subject). The Academy Film Archive preserved Interviews with My Lai Veterans in 2002.

== Cast ==
- Richard Hammer as himself, interviewer (voice)
