= An Inconsistent Truth =

- Poster
- Directed by: Shayne Edwards
- Written by: Phil Valentine
- Produced by: Phil Valentine
- Starring: Phil Valentine
- Music by: Michael Thomas Benoit
- Production company: ExtryGood Productions
- Distributed by: Rocky Mountain Pictures
- Release date: January 27, 2012
- Running time: 89 min
- Country: United States

An Inconsistent Truth is a 2012 documentary film written, produced, and featuring, nationally syndicated conservative talk radio host Phil Valentine and directed by Shayne Edwards. Valentine, who denied climate change and disagreed with the scientific consensus on global warming, interviewed people who deny that there is a consensus on the issue of global warming or climate change, some of which are scientists, about the validity of Al Gore's film An Inconvenient Truth and the facts presented within. The film argues that global warming proponents keep changing its label, basing their argument on what Valentine claims is shaky scientific ground.

== Synopsis ==
An Inconsistent Truth is Valentine's investigation into man-made global warming. The title alludes to Al Gore's documentary An Inconvenient Truth. Valentine talks with scientists and politicians who reject the scientific consensus on climate change, and explores the culture of the global warming movement; often in a satirical way.

The topics covered include CO_{2} being called a pollutant, Gore's contention that polar bears are dying off and the global ice is melting, among others. Valentine also delves into the motivation behind the movement.

== Production ==
The film features a 1985 Mercedes 300D, named Bennie the BioBenz, Valentine bought with the purpose of running it on biodiesel. Valentine makes his own biodiesel by collecting used vegetable oil and running it through a machine called the Fuelmeister. Bennie the BioBenz underwent a facelift prior to its close-ups in the movie from Vogely & Todd Paint and Body Shop in Nashville, TN. When Valentine bought Bennie it had a crushed right front fender, and then the car delivery service damaged Bennie's hood. Valentine purchased a used fender from a junk dealer in Memphis, and the hood was replaced. The car was stripped down to the metal and repainted as well as having its interior restored. Additionally, the famous Mercedes "Turbo Diesel" badging on the car was replaced with a custom "Biodiesel" badge. Bennie can be seen throughout the movie and can be seen on some of the movie's posters.

== Theatrical release ==
An Inconsistent Truth held its world premiere in Nashville at the Regal Hollywood 27 Theaters on January 26, 2012. It opened to the public the next night and was the top-grossing movie per screen in the country for its first two weeks, grossing a total of US$20,733 on the one screen it played on. When it closed as of 15 March 2012, it had made a total of $69,394.

On September 23, 2013, the film was released on DVD. As of January 2020, it is the 27th top-grossing English-language nature documentary of all time at the box office.

== Soundtrack ==
The movie score was written and performed by Michael Thomas Benoit.

The soundtrack features original music from Pacific Heat, Willie B. Green, Chadwick Station, and Phil Valentine & The Heartthrobs. Green's "Dirt People" plays as the end credits roll.

== People appearing in the film ==
- Phil Valentine, narrator
- Newt Gingrich
- Jim DeMint
- James Inhofe
- Fred Singer
- John Christy
- Roy Spencer
- Ken Green
- Greg Walden
- Steven Milloy
- Drew Johnson

== Reception ==
John Beifuss, writing in The Commercial Appeal, noted the tiny release of the film, but still found the opening box office to be "extraordinarily impressive." He observed similarities between the film's producer, Phil Valentine, and another documentary filmmaker, Michael Moore, particularly the way in which Valentine hounds Al Gore for an interview.

== See also ==
- An Inconvenient Truth...Or Convenient Fiction?
- Global warming controversy
