= Bringing King to China =

- Directed by: Kevin McKiernan
- Written by: Kevin McKiernan
- Produced by: Kevin McKiernan
- Cinematography: Kevin McKiernan; Haskell Wexler
- Edited by: Paul Alexander Juutilainen
- Music by: Bronwen Jones
- Release date: January 2011 (USA)
- Running time: 85 minutes
- Language: English

Bringing King to China is a 2011 documentary film by Kevin McKiernan. The cinematographers include three-time Oscar-winner Haskell Wexler.

The documentary is "a father's 'love letter' to his adult daughter, a young American woman's year-long attempt to produce the international premiere of the American Clayborne Carson's play Passages of Martin Luther King on the stage of the National Theatre Company of China. Her life is thrown into turmoil when she learns, mistakenly, that her father, a journalist covering the war in Iraq, has been killed by a suicide bomber."

Bringing King to China conveys the lead character's "dream to build a bridge between the societies by talking about peaceful struggle and universal rights." An American student who first studied in China in high school and later lived there on a Fulbright Scholarship, the lead character chronicles her struggle to interpret and adapt King's message for Chinese society, preserve the historical accuracy of the U.S. civil rights movement, clear bureaucratic hurdles before opening night and raise funds to pay the theater company. The film takes American viewers backstage at the National Theatre Company of China, as Chinese actors rehearse with African-American gospel singers.

The film premiered at the Santa Barbara International Film Festival and won best documentary at the Ventura International Film Festival and the Tulsa International Film Festival. It was also nominated for the Viewfinders Grand Jury Prize at the 2011 DOC NYC Film Festival.

Commentators called the film timely, noting it premiered in the lead-up to the unveiling of the Martin Luther King Jr. Memorial in Washington, D.C.
