= Pacific Research Institute =

California-based free-market think tank

Coordinates: 34°08′44″N 118°08′12″W

- Pacific Research Institute for Public Policy
- Abbreviation: PRI
- Formation: 1979 (47 years ago)
- Founders: Antony Fisher; James North
- Tax ID no.: 94-2528433
- Legal status: 501(c)(3)
- Headquarters: Ste 180; 680 E Colorado Blvd; Pasadena, California 91101-6144; United States (Note: IRS Form-990 yr2020 shows corporate address in Pasadena)
- Location: Sacramento, California, Pasadena, California
- President: Sally C. Pipes (Note: Pipes became president in 1991)
- Chairman: Clark S. Judge (Note: Judge became chairman in 2005)
- Revenue: $7.62 million (2024)
- Expenses: $5.77 million (2024)
- Staff: 8 (2023)
- Website: pacificresearch.org

The Pacific Research Institute for Public Policy (PRI) is a California-based free-market think tank which promotes "the principles of individual freedom and personal responsibility" through policies that emphasize a free economy, private initiative, and limited government. PRI was founded in 1979 by British philanthropist Antony Fisher and San Francisco businessman James North. The organization is headquartered in Pasadena, California, with an additional office in Sacramento.

== Policy areas ==
PRI is active in the policy areas of education, economics, health care, the environment, and water supply. It operates the Center for California's Future, which has a goal of "reinvigorating California's entrepreneurial, self-reliant traditions" and the Laffer Center, which is "focused on educating people on free-markets and supply-side economics."

From 1996 through 2009, the organization published an annual Index of Leading Environmental Indicators, which tracked environmental trends worldwide. PRI started the Center for Medicine in the Public Interest, a New York-based think tank focusing on health policy.

In 2022, PRI president Sally C. Pipes opposed federal efforts to cap copayments at $35 for insulin, and PRI opposed plans by California to back generic manufacturing of the drug.

PRI is a member of the advisory board of Project 2025, a collection of conservative and right-wing policy proposals from the Heritage Foundation to reshape the United States federal government and consolidate executive power should the Republican nominee win the 2024 presidential election.

== Staff ==
Pipes has been president of the institute since 1991. Inspired by Margaret Thatcher, she writes a regular column for Forbes, focusing on health care in the United States. In 2008, she founded the Benjamin Rush Institute as a conservative association for medical students with 20 chapters at medical schools across America. Pipes is originally from Canada and became a U.S. citizen in 2006. She opposes single-payer health care systems.

The current chairman of the board of trustees Clark S. Judge (since 2005) is also a co-founder of the White House Writers Group.

== Finances ==
PRI's total revenues in 2020 were $5.6 million, according to ProPublica's Nonprofit Explorer database. The Lilly Endowment, connected to Eli Lilly and Company, is a donor, contributing $175,000 a year in grants to PRI since 2015, according to The Intercept.

== See also ==
- American Enterprise Institute
- Cato Institute
- State Policy Network
