= Paul Jacobs (activist) =

American journalist (1918–1978)

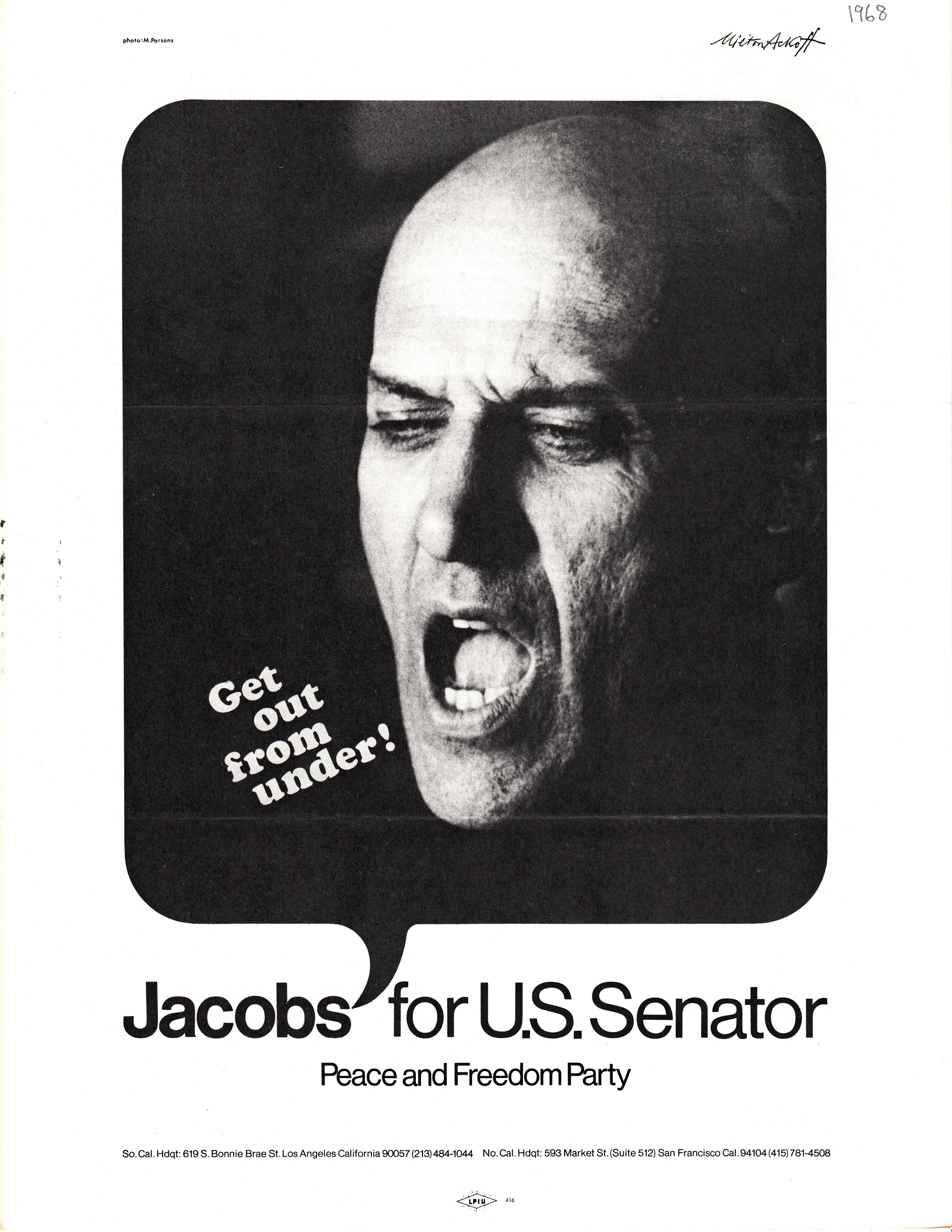
Campaign poster, 1968

Paul Jacobs (August 24, 1918 – January 3, 1978) was a left-wing populist activist, journalist, and co-founder of Mother Jones magazine. In 1966, he signed a tax resistance vow to protest the Vietnam War.

In 1968, Jacobs was the nominee of the Peace and Freedom Party for the U.S. Senate from California. He received 1.31% of the vote.

He is the subject of the 1980 political documentary Paul Jacobs and the Nuclear Gang, which details his investigation into government cover-up of the health hazards related to nuclear weapons testing in 1950s Nevada.
