= Mumtaz Hussain (filmmaker) =

Pakistani-American filmmaker and artist

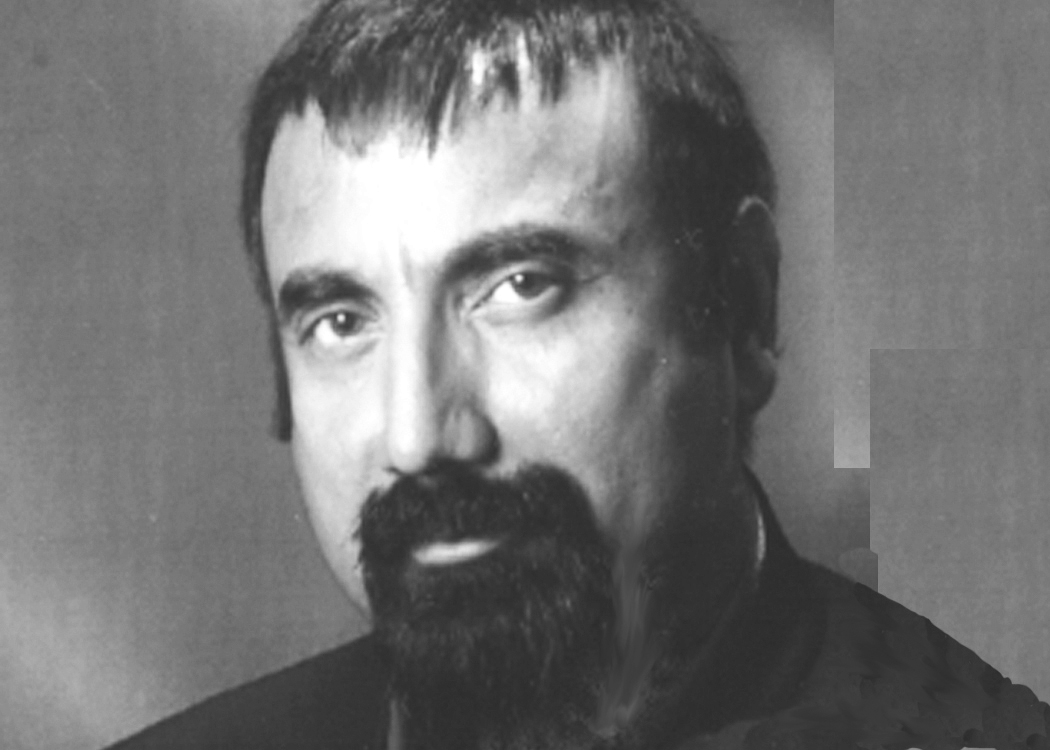
- Born: 1954 (age 71–72); Jhang, Punjab, Pakistan
- Education: National College of Arts, Lahore; School of Visual Arts, New York
- Occupations: Filmmaker; painter; writer; graphic designer
- Notable work: Art=(Love)²; Soul of Civilization; Push Button For

Mumtaz Hussain (born 1954) is a Pakistani-American filmmaker, painter, graphic designer and writer based in New York City. A graduate of the National College of Arts in Lahore, he later studied graphic design and film-making in New York. He is known for the feature film Art=(Love)² (2012) and the short films Soul of Civilization (2003), Inside You (2004), Push Button For (2006) and Butterfly Screams (2007), and has also authored several collections of Urdu short stories.

== Early life and education ==
Hussain was born in 1954 in Jhang, Punjab. In 1979, he was admitted to the National College of Arts (NCA) in Lahore. While at NCA, he was commissioned to paint a seventy-foot mural in central Lahore and to work on the interior of the Sheikh Zayed bin Sultan Palace in Karachi. In 1983, he moved to London to study European art, and in 1984 he relocated to New York, where he enrolled at the School of Visual Arts to study graphic design and film-making.

== Career ==
=== Art and graphic design ===
In New York, Hussain worked as an art director for Calvin Klein, Ralph Lauren and Simon & Schuster. His paintings combine South Asian art and calligraphy with motifs drawn from the Indus Valley civilisation and influences from Cubism and Impressionism, and have been exhibited at galleries and universities in the United States, including under the Indo-American Arts Council's "Erasing Borders" diaspora exhibitions.

=== Film ===
Hussain began making films in the early 2000s, working as writer, director and producer of both short films and animations. His short documentary Soul of Civilization (2003), on the art of the Indus Valley, was screened at the Metropolitan Museum of Art in New York as part of its 2003 exhibition Art of the First Cities, and was later shown at the Queens Museum, Stony Brook University, the University of Wisconsin–Madison and the University of Connecticut. His short film Push Button For (2006), adapted from Ghulam Abbas' Urdu classic Overcoat, was screened at the 6th Karachi International Film Festival in 2006. Other early works include Inside You (2004), based on the poetry of Rumi, Yeh Mera Pakistan Hai (2005), produced for the Pakistani television channel Geo, and Butterfly Screams (2007), a short inspired by the September 11 attacks.

His debut feature, Art=(Love)² (2012), a love story framed by spiritual philosophy, received a merit award at the Lucerne International Film Festival in Switzerland, a cinematography award at the Jaipur International Film Festival in India, a platinum reel award at the Nevada Film Festival and a gold award at the Prestige Film Festival in the United States. It was also an official selection at the Delhi International Film Festival and the Vegas CineFest. Hussain also directed thirteen episodes of the public-affairs talk show Ask a Lawyer on a New York-based Channel 9.

In 2013, his unproduced English-language screenplay The Kind Executioner, a fictionalised account of the relationship between former Pakistani prime minister Zulfikar Ali Bhutto and his hangman Tara Masih, was named a finalist at the Hollywood Screenplay Contest. In 2025, the Department of Graphic Design at the Punjab University College of Art & Design hosted a seminar titled Film as a Social Statement, which featured a screening of Push Button For and a talk by Hussain.

=== Theatre ===
Hussain has written and staged three plays in New York: The Barking Crow, Legal Alien and Virus Bomb. Legal Alien, a satirical piece on capitalism and migration, was performed in New York in 2015. Virus Bomb, which dramatises the experience of victims of the COVID-19 pandemic, was staged at the Baruch Performing Arts Center in Manhattan in October 2022.

=== Literary works ===
Hussain has published four collections of short stories in Urdu, Gool Ainak ke Peechay (2010), Lafzon Main Tasweerain (2014), Peli Patti Chuna Kum (2020) and Mumtaz Hussain Dian Chuwian Kahinian (2021, in the Gurmukhi script), and an English-language collection, Portrait in Words (2023). Reviewing Lafzon Main Tasweerain in Dawn, the critic described the stories as "surreal Kafkaesque experiences uncommon in Urdu literature", rooted in social, cultural and historical concerns. Portrait in Words received an Honorary Mention at the 2023 New England Book Festival.

== Awards and recognition ==
In October 2024, the J. Luce Foundation also named him an Artist-in-Residence. An M.Phil thesis on his work has been completed at the University of the Punjab.

== Filmography ==
Year	Title	Role	Notes
2003	Soul of Civilization	Director, writer	Short
2004	Inside You	Director, writer	Short
2005	Yeh Mera Pakistan Hai	Director	Short
2006	Push Button For	Director, writer	Short
2007	Butterfly Screams	Director, writer	Short
2012	Art=(Love)²	Director, writer, producer	Feature film

== Selected bibliography ==
- Gool Ainak ke Peechay (Urdu short stories, 2010)
- Lafzon Main Tasweerain (Urdu short stories, 2014)
- Peli Patti Chuna Kum (Urdu short stories, 2020)
- Mumtaz Hussain Dian Chuwian Kahinian (Punjabi short stories in Gurmukhi, 2021)
- Portrait in Words (English short stories, 2023)
