= Edgy Lee =

Hawaii-born filmmaker

- Born: 1957 (age 68–69)

Edgy Lee (born 1957) is an independent Hawaii-born filmmaker. Lee’s filmmaking career reflects a dedication to telling authentic and underrepresented stories, especially from the Hawaii and Pacific Islander perspectives.

== Early years ==
Her early career included on-camera work as a model, in TV commercials, series, and films including The Last Married Couple in America and Magnum Force, as co-host of the popular children's series Bill Cosby's Picture Pages, and more.

Lee's music credits include co-compositions with Wayne Shorter (CBS Records, "Atlantis"), film composers Joseph Vitarelli and Robert Wehrman.

In 1999, Lee produced a CD for the Office of Tibet – a compilation of the Dalai Lama's symposia in Hawaii, with rare traditional Tibetan music performed by artists living in exile around the world, Hawaiian chants, and remarks by the late Reverend Abraham Akaka and kumu hula John Lake.

Lee's films include Papakolea – Story of Hawaiian Land (Academy Award-winning cinematographer, Haskell Wexler; Emmy winning writer/producer, Saul Landau); Paniolo O Hawai'i – Cowboys of the Far West; Waikiki – In the Wake of Dreams; and The Hawaiians – Reflecting Spirit, among others. These documentary films were made in the hope of bringing a deeper awareness of the Hawaiian culture to a national public whose image of Native Hawaiians may have been shaped by stereotypes. Waikiki – In the Wake of Dreams contains an original production of the Hawaiian classic "Waikiki", performed and arranged by Grammy winners Take 6. Warner Bros. Records released a companion soundtrack CD to the film Paniolo O Hawaii, produced by former Warner Bros. Records President Jim Ed Norman with Hawaiian kumu and performer, Nani Lim, and a Public Radio International one-hour program incorporated excerpts and music from the film.

Waikiki premiered at the National Geographic Society and received the 2002 New York International Independent Film Festival awards for Best Cinematography and Best Editing. Its Hawaii premiere was held on Kuhio Beach, the first open air public screening of a film in Waikiki, which initiated the City and County of Honolulu's successful tourism event that now attracts thousands to Waikiki every month to the "Sunset on the Beach" film screening event. At the Chicago International Film Festival it received an Intercom Gold Plaque.

Other Lee films have premiered at the Smithsonian Institution, City Museum and Hirshhorn Museum in Washington DC, the Asian Art Museum of San Francisco, the Heard Museum in Phoenix, the Autry National Center and the Museum of Natural History in Los Angeles, at other U.S. museums and small theatres, and at special film screenings and events held on Waikiki Beach and New York's waterfront. In 2005 Lee's film, The Hawaiians – Reflecting Spirit (title sponsor, Office of Hawaiian Affairs) opened festivities at the Smithsonian's Museum of the American Indian in Washington, D.C.

Lee also co-produced and directed Life or Meth and ICE: Hawaii's Crystal Meth Epidemic, two independently produced films on the methamphetamine epidemic in Hawaii. Both films were simulcast across the state of Hawaii on eleven TV stations and continue to garner national acclaim. Utilized by several Native American communities where meth addiction is on the rise, these films were the first in-depth documentaries on the subject. In 2005, Lee produced "Unprescribed - Prescription for Addiction", an overview of America's prescription drug epidemic and turn toward heroin use across the U.S. The film intro by former US Attorney General Eric Holder; ONDCP Director Michael Bottecelli, SAMHSA Dir. Dr Nora Volkow, other national experts appear.

In 2008 Lee founded PacificNetwork.tv, an Internet network streaming high quality HD video, original films, cultural news, a "Hawaiian - Pacific portal to the world". Pacific Network aka Pure Pacific, is known as an early example of "new media" aligning with traditional media and bridging the gap between competitive media platforms. Pacific Network studios are located in Honolulu and Papeete, Tahiti. Edgy Lee was also the U.S. representative of the Honotua Project, the submarine cable connecting French Polynesia to the U.S. via Hawaii.

== Awards, special presentations and exhibits ==
- 2024 - Co-composition with Wayne Shorter (1985), “When You Dream” performed by Esperanza Spalding and Milton Nascimento, Concord Records. Tribute to Wayne Shorter, a creative mentor to Spalding
- 2024 - Producer, The Womenʻs Prison Project Mural], Hawaii Women’s Community Correctional Center
- 2023 - Paris Short Film Festival selected short, “Our Culture is Our Strength”
- 2022 - Telly Award, Gold Winner for "Ute Mountain Ute Tribe - We Are Nuchu" - Categories: General-Remote Production, Craft-Use of Music, Craft-Directing
- 2022 - Telly Award, Silver Winner for "Ute Mountain Ute Tribe - We Are Nuchu" - Categories: General-Social Video, Craft-Use of Archival Footage, Craft-Voiceover, General-Cultural, General-History, Craft-Editing, General-Public Service & Activism, General-Not For Profit
- 2021 - (2) Gold Telly Awards (Director, Social Issues; Editor, Cultural Non Broadcast); (2) Silver Telly Awards 2021 (Co Writing, various), 4 Bronze Telly Awards 2021 for “Culture is our Strength” short film, Ute Mountain, Ute Tribe of Colorado
- 2018 - National Telly Silver Award Non-Broadcast, Best History, “Liliuokalani Reflections of Our Queen”
- 2018 - National Tell Bronze Award Non-Broadcast, Biography, “Liliuokalani Reflections of Our Queen”
- 2015 - National Telly Award Bronze, Documentary Film, Social Issues Category, “Unprescribed” produced for the White House Office of National Drug Control Policy (ONDCP), The High Intensity Drug Trafficking Areas (HIDTA) Program
- 2015 - Telly Award (Bronze, documentary film, Social issues category)
- 2013 - Hawaii State Senate Special Artist’s Recognition
- 2013 - Paniolo Preservation Society – First Honorary Director for Life
- 2011 - TEDx Honolulu, Featured Speaker
- 2008 - Molokai Film Festival, Filmmaker of the Year
- 2002 - New York International Independent Film and Video Festival – Best Cinematography (Jiri Dvorsky)
- 2002 - New York International Independent Film and Video Festival – Best Editing, Documentary Film (Edgy Lee)
- 2001 - Chicago International Film Festival – INTERCOM Gold Plaque
- 2001 - Kahili Award, Literary Category (Edgy Lee / Paul Berry)
- 2000 - Kahili Best of Show Award and Kahili Award for Media Broadcasting
- 1998 - Chicago International Film Festival – INTERCOM Silver Plaque
- 1998 - Chicago International Film Festival – Individual Achievement Award, Writing (Edgy Lee)
- 1995 - Silver Award, National Educational Media Network
- 1994 - Silver Award, Excellence in TV Programming, Independent, Corporation for Public Broadcasting
- 1993 - CINE Golden Eagle Award, Papakolea: Story of Hawaiian Land - Edgy Lee, Producer, Director, and Writer
