= Loma Linda (disambiguation) =

Loma Linda (Spanish for "beautiful hill") may refer to:

- Loma Linda, California
  - Loma Linda Academy
  - Loma Linda University
  - Loma Linda University Church
  - Loma Linda University Medical Center
- North Loma Linda, San Bernardino
- Loma Linda, Missouri
- Loma Linda East, Texas
- Loma Linda Foods
