= Bryn Mawr, California =

Bryn Mawr
- District of Loma Linda; Former unincorporated community
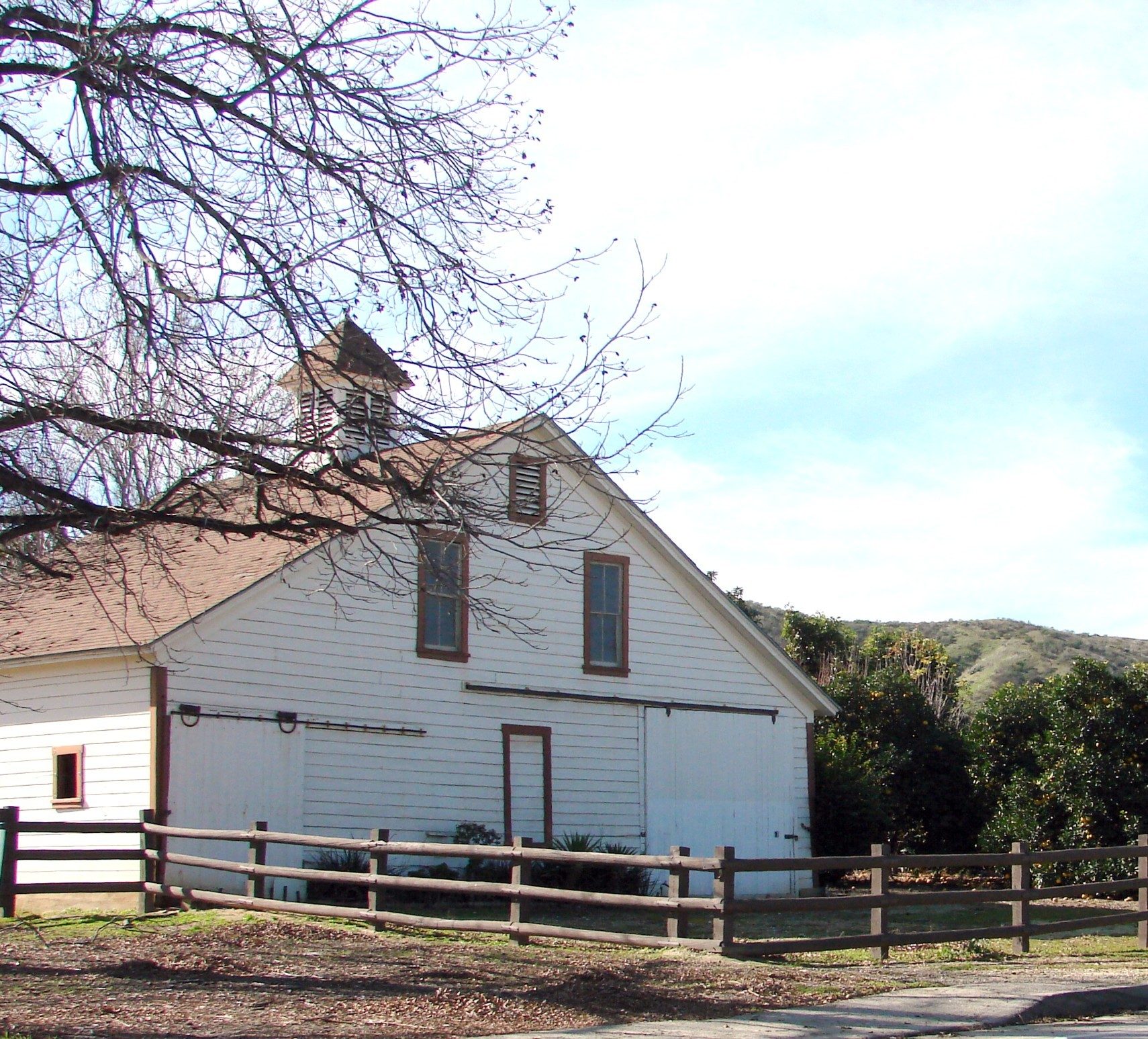
- A barn in Bryn Mawr

- Location within the state of California
- Coordinates: 34°02′54″N 117°13′51″W
- Country: United States
- State: California
- County: San Bernardino
- City: Loma Linda
- Elevation: 1,049 ft (320 m)

Population (2000)
  - Total: 213
- Time zone: UTC-8 (Pacific (PST))
  - Summer (DST): UTC-7 (PDT)
- ZIP code: 92318
- GNIS feature ID: 255377

Bryn Mawr (/brɪn ˈmɑːr/ brin MAR; from Welsh for 'big hill'), formerly Nahant, Redlands Junction and West Redlands, is a formerly unincorporated community in San Bernardino County, California, United States, annexed mostly by the city of Loma Linda and a small portion by Redlands. As of 2000, its population numbered 213.

== History ==
Originally named Nahant in the 1880s, the community was renamed Redlands Junction after a Southern Pacific Railroad depot was built in the town, accompanying the railroad through nearby San Timoteo Canyon. the community's name was changed to Bryn Mawr, and the depot added a post office in 1895. In the 1900s, the town was prosperous along with the local citrus industry, and four packing houses were built in the area. Before the first packing house was built in 1902, citrus fruit was packed at the railroad depot. Local amenities included a general store, blacksmith's shop, pool room, service station, market, restaurant and workers' cabins.

The town slowly blended into nearby cities after the citrus industry was no longer an economic force in the area; a post office built in 1971 remains but the train depot was demolished. Parts of the town were incorporated into the city of Loma Linda when it incorporated in 1970, and the remaining area was controversially annexed by the city in 2008 at the suggestion of the county's Local Agency Formation Commission. The area is now mostly a suburban residential neighborhood.

== Education ==
The Redlands Unified School District serves Bryn Mawr.

== Landmarks ==
San Timoteo Creek flows through the community, and San Timoteo Canyon is nearby. Bryn Mawr Elementary School, the Loma Linda Broadcasting Network, and a historic Native American mission school and former Catholic church (now the Loma Linda Romanian Seventh-day Adventist Church) are located in the community, and Barton Villa in neighboring Redlands is just east of the area.

Two parks are located in the neighborhood: Leonard Bailey Park, named after the heart surgeon who operated on Baby Fae at the nearby Loma Linda University Medical Center, and Bryn Mawr Veterans' Memorial Park, built by the city of Loma Linda after the 2008 annexation in order to mollify local residents.
