= VDC =

VDC may refer to:

== Military ==
- Volunteer Defence Corps (Australia)
- Volunteer Defense Corps (Thailand)

== Technology ==
- Vehicle Dynamics Control, a means of increasing vehicle stability through a combination of throttle restriction and braking
- Voltage direct current, a contraction often found in electronics when specifying voltage in a mixed AC/DC environment
- Video display controller, a computer graphics chip
- Virtual design and construction, modeling software and techniques to design and evaluate possible construction processes
- Virtual DataCine, a digital image processing technique for converting motion picture film to video

== Other uses ==
- Valletta Design Cluster, a culture and creativity centre in Malta
- Valve Developer Community, the official wiki for developers of games and mods based on the computer game Half-Life 2
- Velocity : Design : Comfort, the 2nd studio album by Sweet Trip
- Vietnam Day Committee, an anti-war group formed at Berkeley, California in 1965 by activist Jerry Rubin
- Violations Documentation Center in Syria, a Syrian organisation documenting deaths, detentions, missing persons and kidnappings due to the Syrian civil war
- Vitória da Conquista Airport (IATA airport code VDC), Vitória da Conquista, Brazil
- Virtual Digital Cable, a defunct media and technology company that delivered television to desktop computers and mobile devices
- Virtual Dining Concepts, American company specializing in virtual restaurants

== See also ==
- Village development committee (disambiguation)
