= Coom =

Coom may refer to:

- Pippa Coom, a New Zealand politician
- Coom Wedge Tomb, a wedge tomb on the Iveragh Peninsula

== See also ==
- Coomer (disambiguation)
