= Ryan Fien =

Profile
- Position: Quarterback

Personal information
- Born: c. 1974

Career information
- High school: Royal (Simi Valley, CA)
- College: UCLA (1992, 1994–1995): Idaho (1996)

Ryan Fien (born c. 1975) is a former American football quarterback. Born in Loma Linda, California, and raised in Corona, California, he played high school football at Royal High School in Simi Valley, California. He played college football as a backup for the UCLA Bruins in 1992, 1994, and 1995, and as a starter for the Idaho Vandals in 1996. As a senior in 1996, he ranked among the leading quarterbacks in major-college football with 3,675 passing yards (3rd), 334 yards gained per game played (2nd), 27 passing touchdowns (7th), and 21 passing interceptions (1st).
