= LLA =

LLA may stand for:

- Latitude, longitude, and altitude, in a geographic coordinate system
- Irish Land and Labour Association
- La Liga Argentina de Básquet, 2nd-division Argentinian basketball league
- Lady Literate in Arts, qualification formerly awarded by St Andrews University, Scotland
- Licensed Landscape Architect, a postnominal qualification for Landscape Architects in the USA
- Liga Latinoamérica, a professional esports league for the MOBA PC game League of Legends
- Link-local address, a type of computer network address
- Llanaber railway station, Gwynedd, Wales (National Rail station code)
- Löfbergs Lila Arena, former name of Löfbergs Arena
- Loma Linda Academy, school in California, USA
- London Luton Airport, also known as Luton Airport, England
- Louisiana Library Association, a professional association for librarians in Louisiana
- Luleå/Kallax Airport, Sweden, IATA airport code
- La Libertad Avanza, a libertarian conservative Argentine political coalition
