= Loma Linda Broadcasting Network =

Seventh-day Adventist Christian television network

- Headquarters: Loma Linda, California

Ownership
- Owner: Loma Linda Broadcasting Network Inc

History
- Launched: 1996

Links
- Website: LLBN.tv

Availability

Streaming media
- VDC: Channel 320

Loma Linda Broadcasting Network (LLBN) is a non-profit, community and variety television, Christian broadcasting network in Loma Linda, California founded in 1996. Broadcast can be received via GloryStar Satellite Systems - Galaxy 19, Internet video streaming on each website, IPTV services such as Roku and Roku devices, Joozoor TV and many more, and Verizon FiOS and cable/low and high power TV stations in select areas. LLBN English broadcasts on Glorystar channel 105, along with LLBN Arabic on Glorystar channel 405 and LLBN Latino on Glorystar channel 505. It is located in Loma Linda which is known as one of only five blue zones worldwide from the surrounding Seventh-day Adventist community from which it draws for its programs, with values and lifestyle centered on the Seventh-day Adventist Church and from the Loma Linda University and Hospital nearby.

== Programming ==
LLBN broadcasts programs such as talk shows, interview features, church services, preaching programs, musical concerts, sing-along programs and others, in multiple languages. LLBN can be viewed on every inhabited continent via satellite and the Internet. LLBN has also spawned two additional ethnic channels, LLBN Arabic and LLBN Chinese.

It features programming from the Loma Linda University Church of Seventh-day Adventists as a part of their weekly programs.

== Guests Speakers ==
It has had special guest speakers such as James Burr who is recognized throughout the world for his achievements in telescope design and manufacturing and his design patents for astronomy accessories and lectures on Astronomy from a biblical perspective, and Shawn Boonstra, speaker/director for It Is Written. LLBN's Christian Connections had Ted Wilson, president of the Seventh-day Adventist world church. It had Drs. Lawrence Geraty and Douglas Clark of The Center for Near Eastern Archaeology at La Sierra University and archaeologists Kent Bramlett and Chang Ho Ji, looking at the contributions of Middle Eastern archaeology to our understanding of the Bible and also Dr. Lynn Martell with inspirational stories of people who have confronted and overcome personal medical challenges.

== See also ==
- Media ministries of the Seventh-day Adventist Church
- Seventh-day Adventist Church
- Religious broadcasting
