= Libertador San Martín =

- Municipality and village
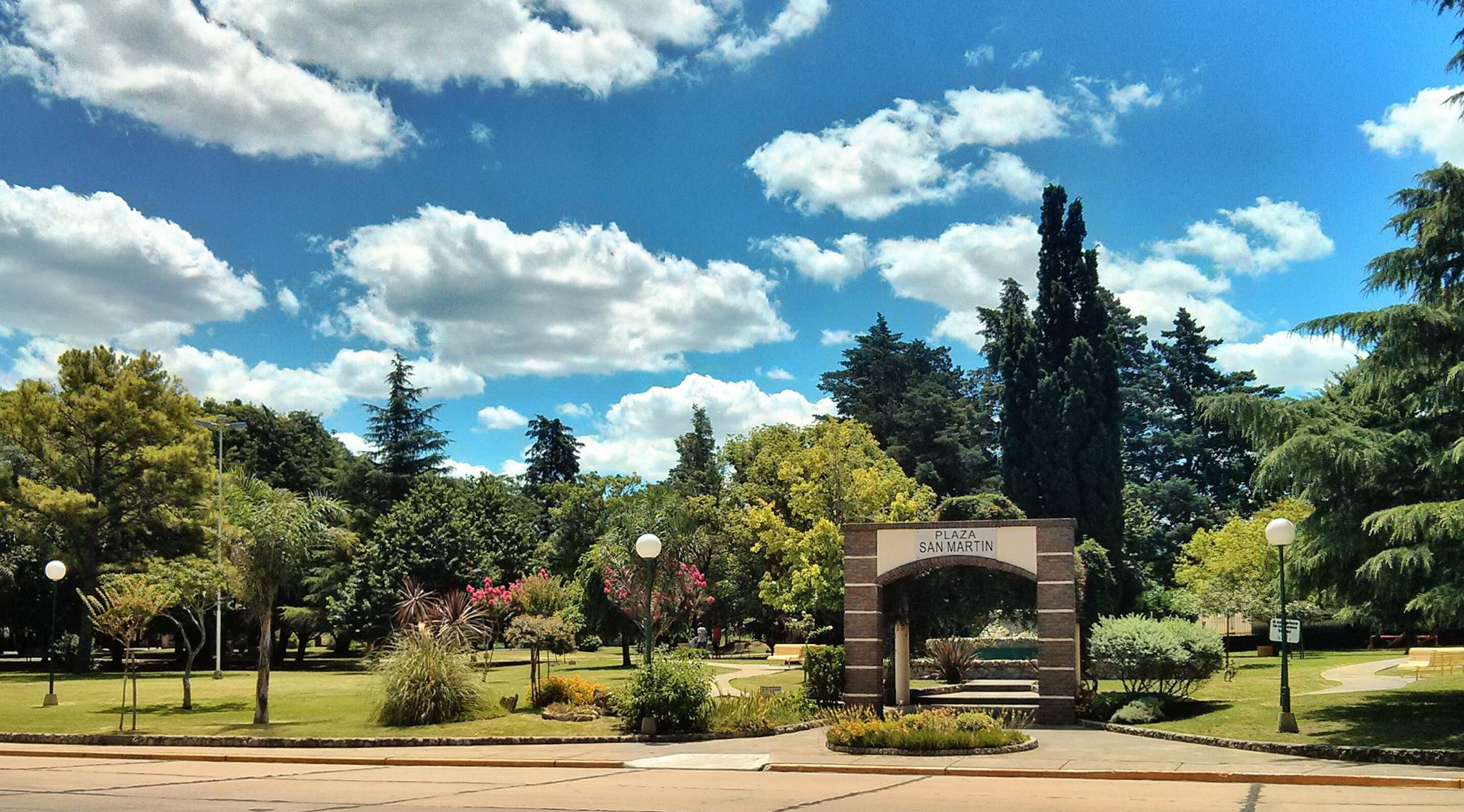
- A view of San Martín square as seen from the local bus station.

- Location within Argentina
- Coordinates: 32°04′00″S 60°28′00″W
- Country: Argentina
- Province: Entre Ríos
- Elevation: 23 ft (7 m)

Population (2010)
  - Total: 6,545
- Time zone: UTC−3 (ART)

Libertador San Martín is a municipality in Entre Ríos Province, central Argentina. It is located alongside National Route 131, near the city of Crespo, and about 60 km from provincial capital Paraná.

The town is home to the Universidad Adventista del Plata (founded in 1898) and the Sanatorio Adventista del Plata (founded in 1908). The majority of its residents are Seventh-day Adventists.

== History ==
The town had its beginnings in 1898, when a group of Christian, Seventh-day Adventist immigrants arrived in Entre Ríos province with the aim of opening a new school to teach agriculture and theology. From 1909 until the late 1960s, trains were an important means of transport, with the Puiggari train station being the main hub used by people travelling to and from Libertador. This is the reason Libertador San Martín is known today also as "Puiggari".

In 1971, Libertador earned official city status.

== Gallery ==
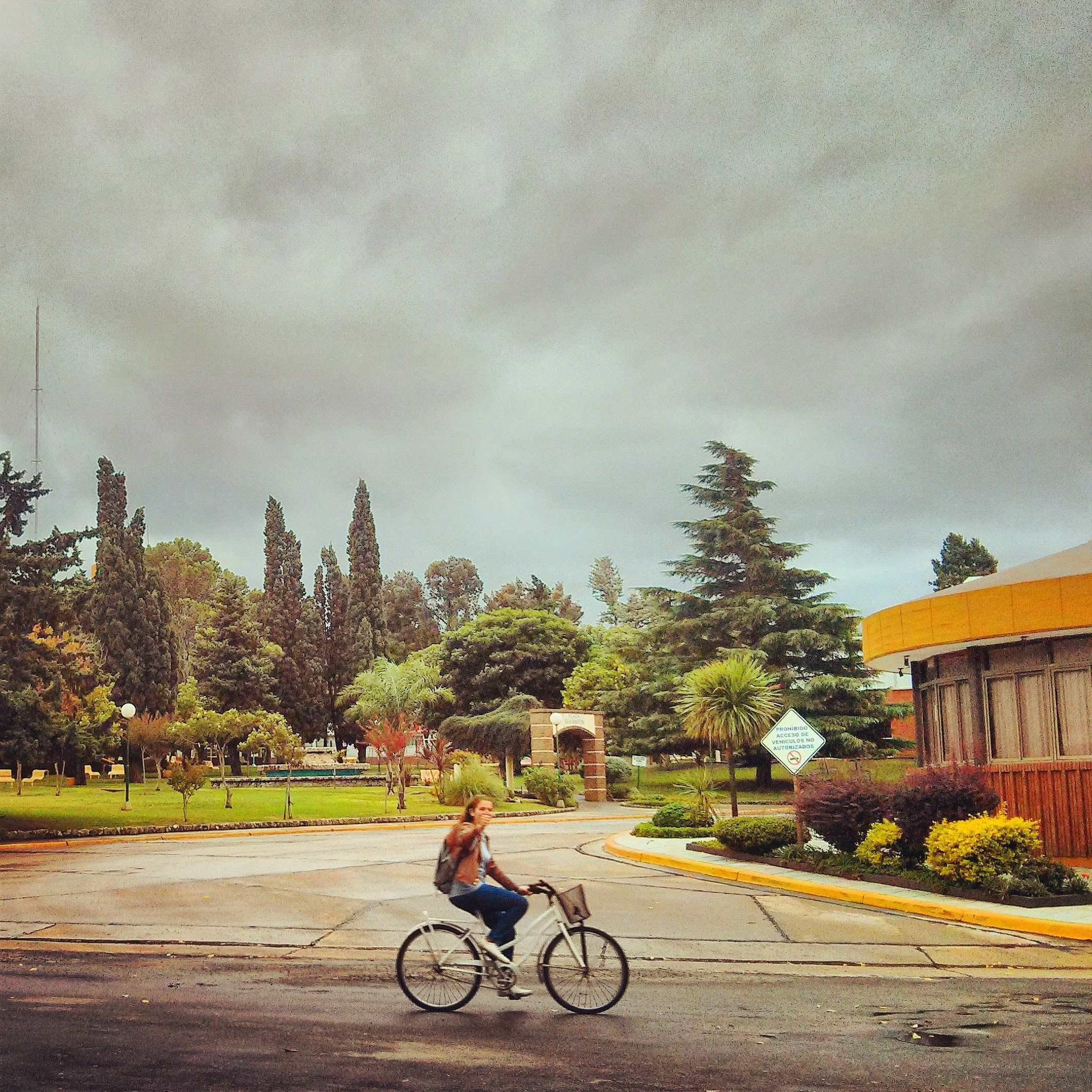
View of Plaza San Martín on a rainy day

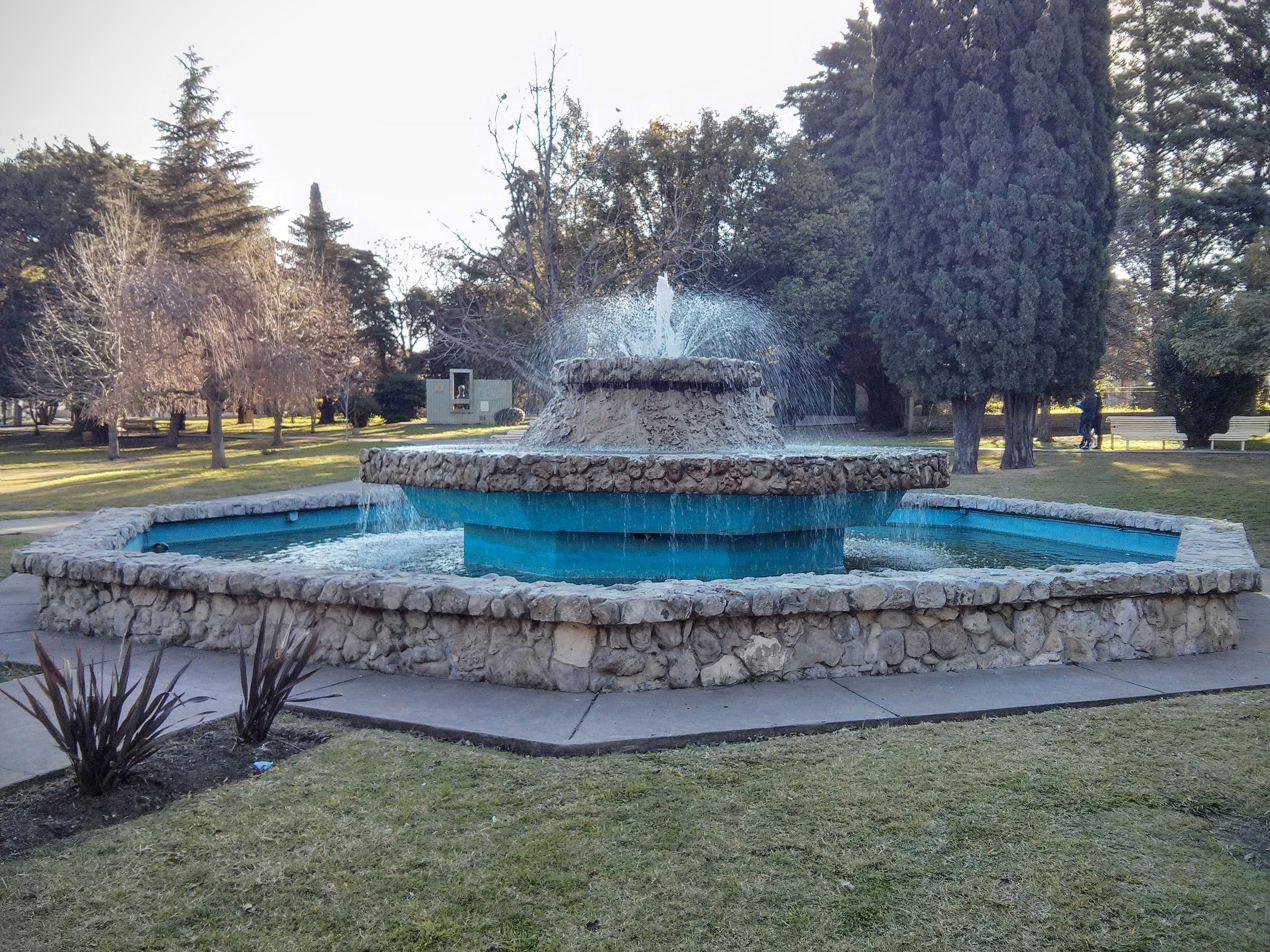
Fountain at Plaza San Martín

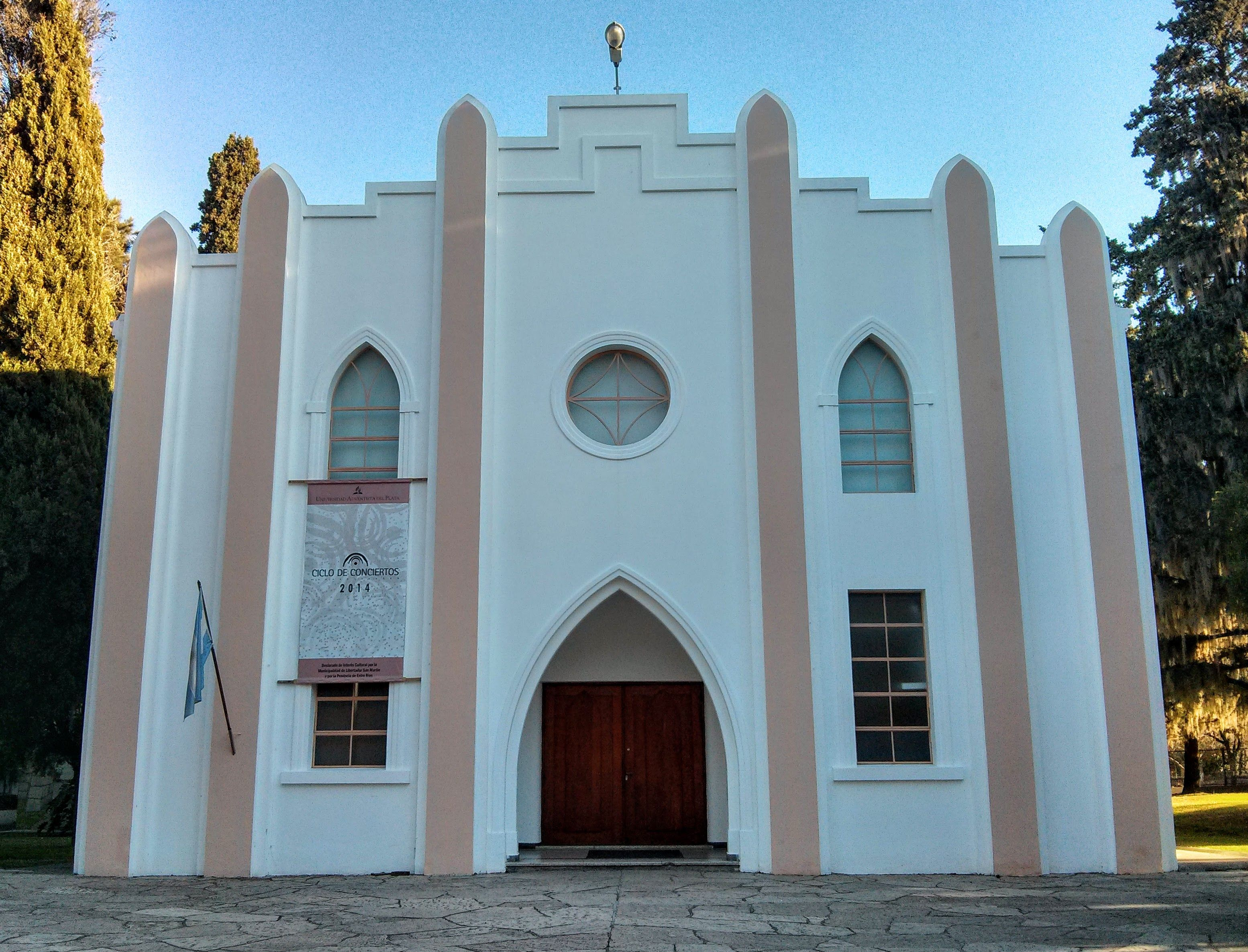
Iglesia de los Pioneros, church and oldest building in town

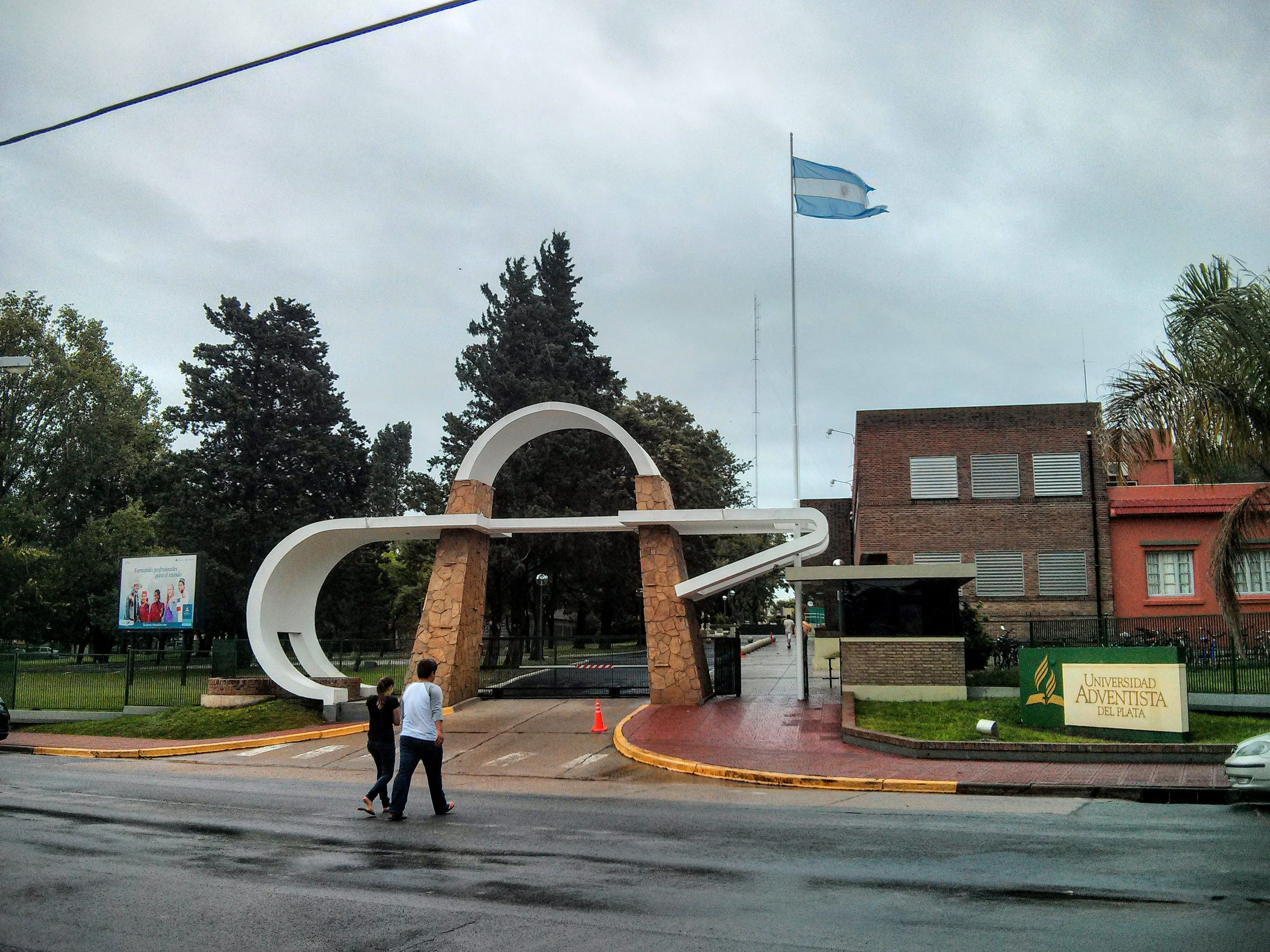
A view of the entrance to Universidad Adventista del Plata on a rainy day

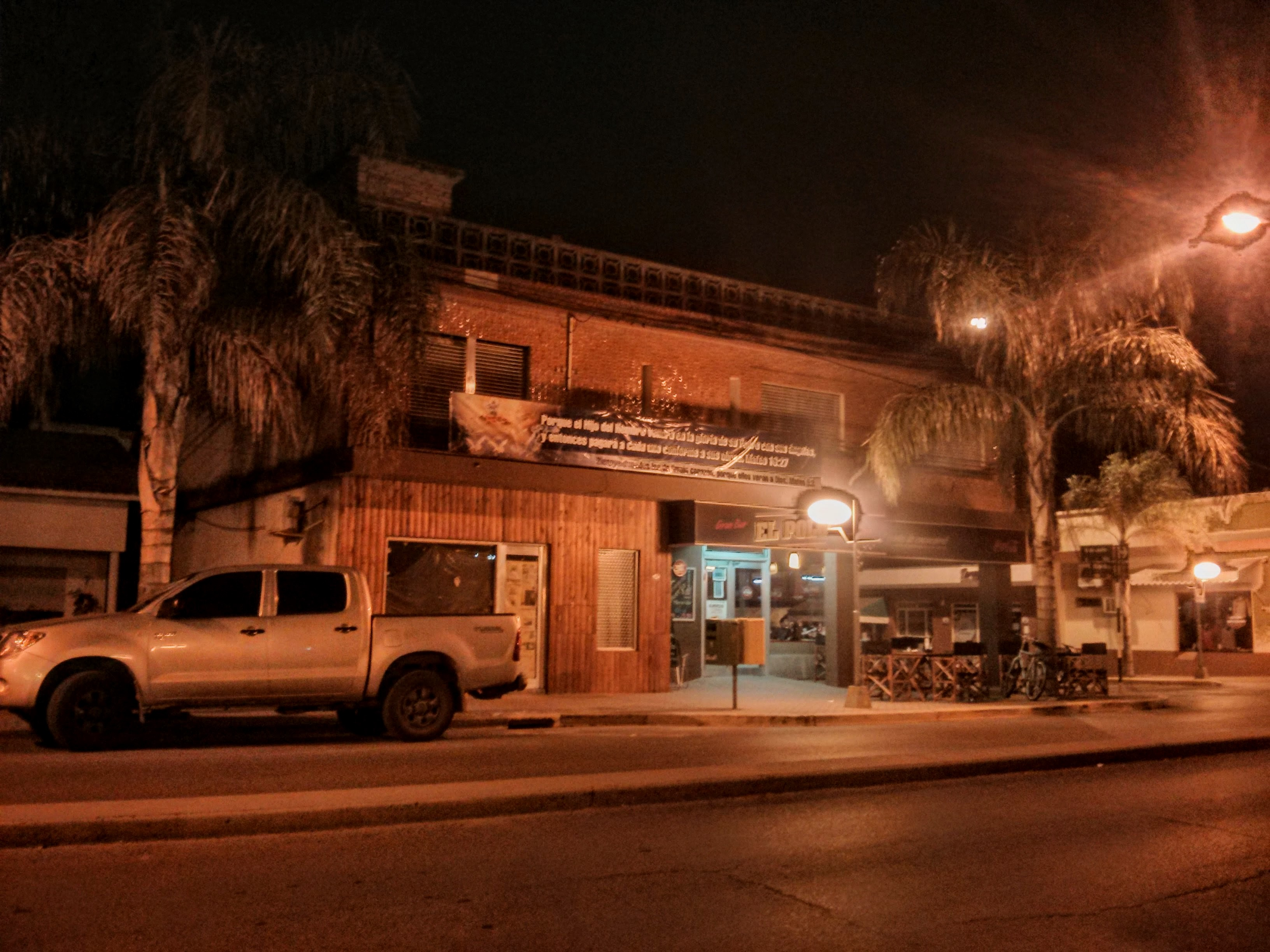
Restaurant at night

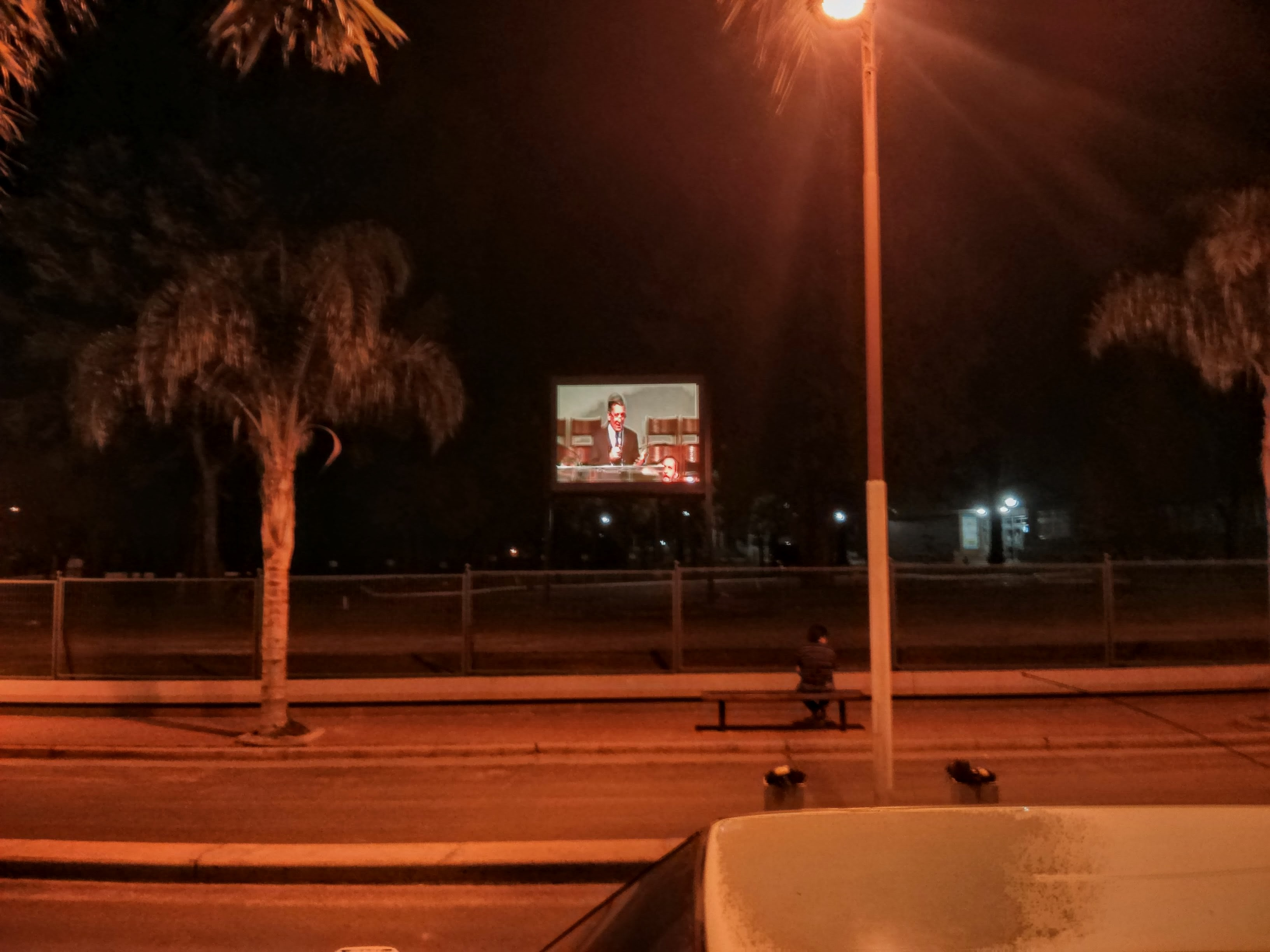
Main street, 25 de mayo, at night

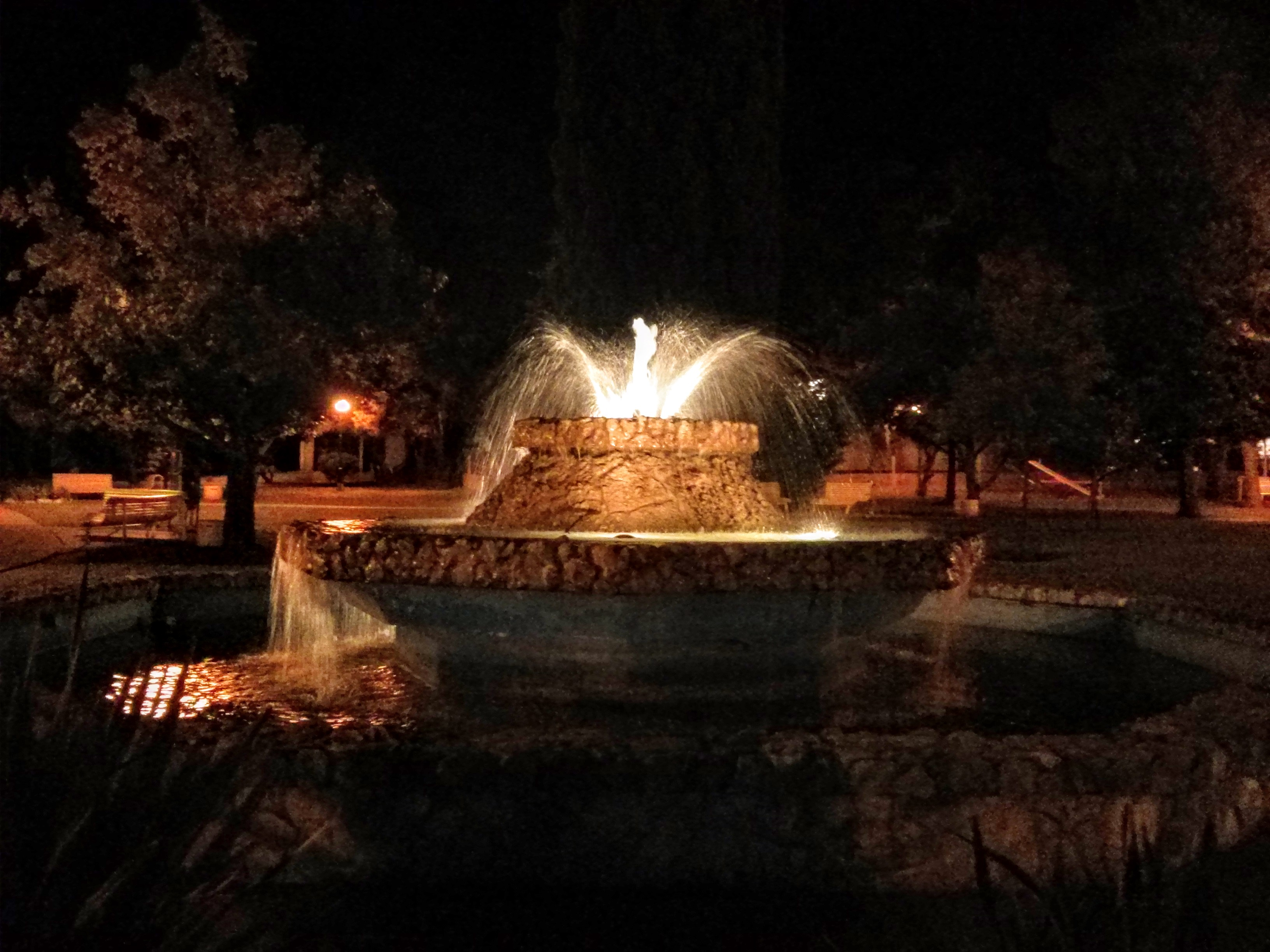
Fountain at Plaza San Martín at night

== Twin towns ==
- Loma Linda, California
