= Loma Linda Academy =

Location
- 10656 Anderson Street; Loma Linda, California 92354-2199; United States; 34°03′36″N 117°15′41″W

Information
- School type: Private college preparatory school
- Denomination: Seventh-Day Adventist
- Established: 1906
- Status: Open
- Authority: Southeastern California Conference of Seventh-day Adventists
- CEEB code: 051445
- NCES School ID: 00094474
- High School Principal: Robin Banks
- Head of Schools: Iveth Valenzuela
- Grades: Children's Center–12
- Gender: Co-ed
- Enrollment: 1146
- Campus type: Suburban
- Colors: Maroon and white
- Athletics: Men's and women's varsity and junior varsity
- Athletics conference: CIF - Southern Section
- Mascot: Roadrunner
- Accreditation: Western Association of Schools and Colleges
- Newspaper: The Mirror
- Yearbook: Lomasphere
- Website: http://www.lla.org

Loma Linda Academy (LLA) is a Seventh-day Adventist K-12 college preparatory coeducational school in Loma Linda, California, United States. It is the largest Seventh-day Adventist K-12 school in the United States. LLA is one of the Adventist institutions located in the town, including Loma Linda University and Loma Linda University Church.

== History ==
The school was founded on January 13, 1906, with six students in a pitched tent on Sanitarium Hill, Loma Linda. It was previously named Loma Linda Union Academy. In 1921, as the school continued to grow, LLA had its first graduated class. In the 1930s, a building, now known as Franz Hall, was constructed in an effort to continue as a thriving school.

Forty-two years later after the school was founded, the main building of the school was burned down in a fire, resulting in multiple records and documents being lost.

In 1969, San Timoteo Creek, which forms the northern boundary of the school's property, flooded the entire school and parts of the city, causing hundreds of thousands of dollars in damage to the school.

== Accreditation ==
Loma Linda Academy is accredited by the Accrediting Commission for Schools, Western Association of Schools and Colleges, and the Adventist Accrediting Association.

== Campus ==
The Loma Linda Academy campus is located in the north western portion of the city of Loma Linda. It is bordered on the east by Anderson St. and lies between San Timoteo Creek on the north and the Union Pacific tracks on the south. The campus is split by Academy St. which separates the elementary (LLE) on the south from the junior high, high school, and their athletic fields on the north side. LLA does not provide busing for students, but the school can be reached by public transit via Omnitrans fixed-route service and sbX. There is also a Class I path planned for the banks of San Timoteo Creek.

== Student life ==
The academy publishes a student newspaper, The Mirror, as well as an annual yearbook, Lomasphere.

=== Athletics ===
The LLA athletics department is dedicated to helping students in "developing a Christ-like character through teamwork, sportsmanship, integrity, honesty, and respect." The school mascot is the roadrunner and the Roadrunners compete in the California Interscholastic Federation (CIF). LLA's varsity teams include cross-country, flag football, volleyball, basketball, soccer, golf, baseball, softball, swimming, and badminton. Junior varsity teams consist of volleyball, basketball, soccer, baseball, badminton, and flag football.

== See also ==
- List of Seventh-day Adventist secondary schools
- Seventh-day Adventist education
