= Adventist University of the Plata =

Christian university in Entre Ríos, Argentina

Coordinates: 32.1308°S 60.78°W

River Plate Adventist University
- Universidad Adventista del Plata
- Former name: Colegio Adventista del Plata (Adventist School of the Plata)
- Motto: Janua ad excellentiam et operam
- Motto in English: Gate to excellence and service
- Type: Private
- Established: 1898
- Affiliations: Seventh-day Adventist Church
- President: Darío Caviglione
- Rector: Horacio Rizzo
- Students: 3000 (2019)
- Location: Libertador San Martín, Entre Ríos, Argentina
- Colours: White and Blue
- Website: www.uap.edu.ar
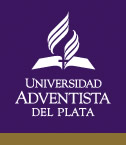

River Plate Adventist University (Spanish: Universidad Adventista del Plata) is a private Christian coeducational university in Libertador San Martín, Entre Ríos, Argentina, founded in 1898.

The University began as a small rural training school which later became known as Colegio Adventista del Plata (Adventist School of the Plata). After being given official recognition by CoNEAU in the 1990s and the signing of a decree by President Eduardo Duhalde in 2002, it became the Universidad Adventista del Plata. In 1994, its medical school was founded.

The Adventist University of the Plata is part of the Seventh-day Adventist education system, the world's second largest Christian school system. Academic activities take place on a campus covering 18 hectares. It operates mainly from March to December, with post-doctoral theology courses offered during January–February of each year.

The facilities include laboratories, classrooms, multimedia services and conference rooms that are used both for classes and in the summer courses. The University has a large library that includes more than 60,000 volumes, Internet access and a special library with magazines (mostly scientific journals). The University runs an exchange program with partners in several national and foreign universities. The Library also hosts the Centre for Educational Technology and Self-learning, equipped for research work, plus an auditorium that can seat 200 guests, and the Ellen White Research Center.

The sports complex includes a tennis court, a beach volleyball court, a swimming pool and an indoor gymnasium in which organised recreational activities are carried out. The institution also has an FM transmitter, a TV studio and recording studios, part of the Communications Department.

Enrollment for the year 2019 totaled 3000 students. Since the Argentine economic crisis (1998–2002), the number of foreign students has increased abruptly owing to the devaluation of the Argentine peso, making UAP one of the most culturally diverse universities in South America, totalling 36% in 2019.

On May 7, 2015, it was announced that UAP had begun accreditation procedures before the CoNEAU with the aim of opening a School of Dentistry by the year 2017.

== History ==
The first Seventh-day Adventist institution in South America was School of the Plata, in the province of Entre Rios, thirteen miles from the city of Diamante, near the Paraná River.

In 1898, a group of Adventists were living in the area of Crespo with the missionary Francisco Westphal. They were having a meeting to discuss the scope of the Adventist work in Argentina. The harvest had been reduced in the last few years due to a locust plague and they were not planning to found a school. The situation changed on September 26; just when the meetings were about to end, a young man from Uruguay, Luis Ernst, arrived to study at the "Adventist School", an institution that did not yet exist. By the time the meetings were to end, the group had decided to found a school. Ernst helped Westphal with his missionary work until the first building had been erected. Classes in grammar and theology were the first ones to be offered.

The school started out in Las Tunas (Santa Fe) where there was an established Adventist community, until buildings could be constructed in Entre Ríos. In Las Tunas, the first teacher was Nelson Town; over time the school was moved to land donated by the Lust family.

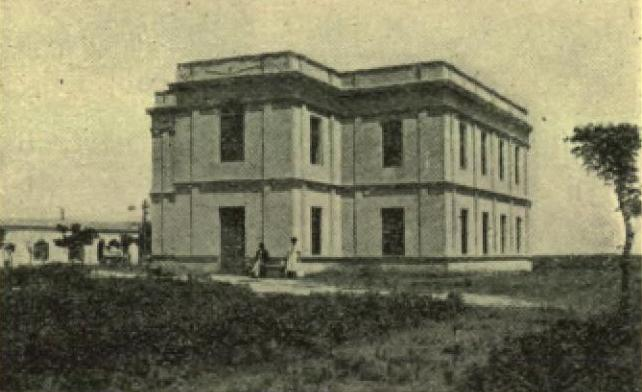
School of the Plata, 1909.

=== The Fourth Quarter Thirteenth Sabbath Offering of 1912 ===
J. W. Westphal, brother to Francisco Westphal and president of the South American Union Conference, wrote to the General Conference of Seventh-day Adventists: " ... Brother Spicer, you have just visited us, and are acquainted with the situation in our Argentine school. You know what buildings we have, their condition, and the great needs. We are limping along as best we can; yet we cannot offer to our students and to the teachers in the matter of room what they ought to have. In the large schoolroom [the chapel] three classes have to recite at the same time, because the class-rooms above are used as living-rooms for the students. One teacher has his class-room in the vestibule [by the stairway] and the others have to help themselves as best they can; and the whole equipment is far from desirable." (p. 5)

In response to Westphal's letter, the General Conference included the Colegio del Plata (School of the Plata) in the fledgling Thirteenth Sabbath Offering plan. This Offering plan began in 1912. In the first quarter of 1912, the first Thirteenth Sabbath Offering helped establish the mission work of G. W. Pettit and J. M. Comer in India. In the second quarter the offering helped build a school in eastern Africa; now the Adventist University of Eastern Africa in Kenya." The fourth quarter of 1912 focused on Colegio Adventista del Plata in Argentina and the Pua Training-school in Chile.

The Thirteenth Sabbath Offering has helped the School of the Plata on at least one other occasion. In the third quarter of 1961, the Thirteenth Sabbath Offering focused on a new Boys' Dormitory for School of the Plata.

=== Sanatorium of the Plata ===
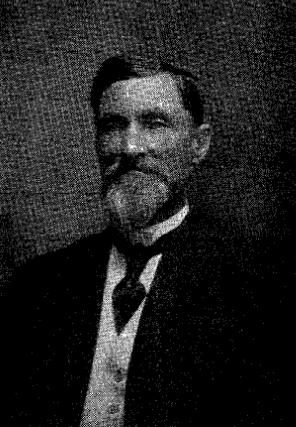
Ole Oppegard, Adventist nurse and colporteur, 1895

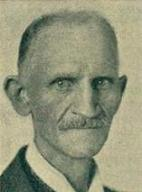
R. H. Habenicht, Founder of Sanatorium of the Plata, 1908

The close proximity of the Sanatorium of the Plata to the School has benefited the development of the Seventh-Day Adventist Church in South America. Graduates from the Sanatorium's nursing program have served all of South America.

Early Adventists referred to their health activities as Medical Missionary Work. This work began in South America when Ole Oppegard, a nurse trained in Battle Creek Sanatorium, arrived in Argentina as a self-supporting missionary and began preaching the health message with the gospel in 1895.

Dr. Robert Habenicht, the first Adventist doctor to serve in South America, arrived in 1901. He began seeing patients in the neighbourhood of the School. A great share of his time was spent travelling in the horse-drawn carts of the Russian immigrant farmers whose homes were far out in the country in the province of Entre Rios.

Soon the patients began arriving at his house in search of competent medical help. Many times Dr. Habenicht had to perform operations on his kitchen table in order to save the life of a patient. After the surgery, he would put them in the beds of his own children, who then had to sleep on the floor.

Dr. Habenicht founded the Sanatorium of the Plata in 1908, with accommodations for six inpatients. This was the beginning of the first Adventist medical institution in South America.

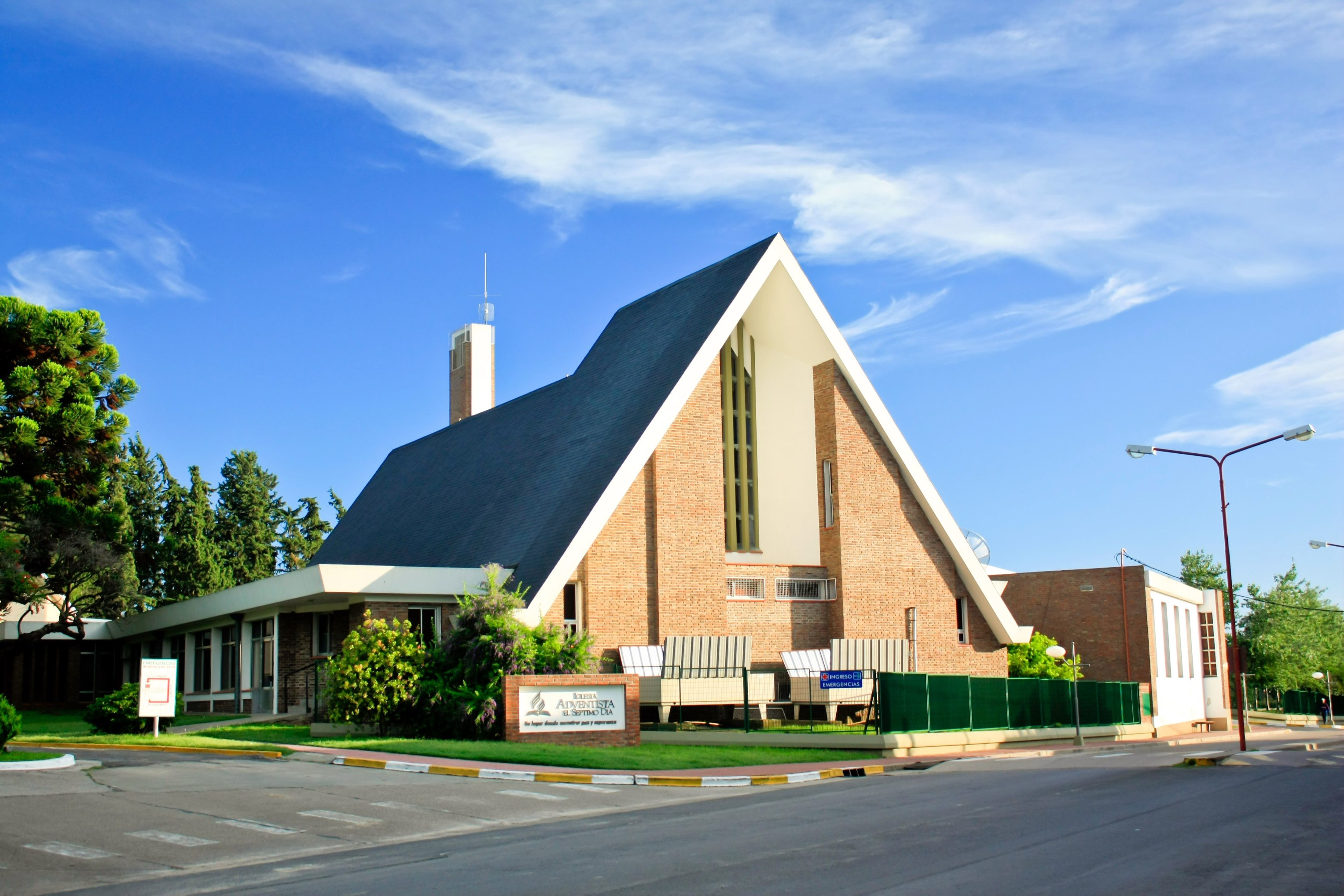
Photo of the church in front of the Sanatorium of the Plata

Over the years, the sanatorium's fame increased greatly, in part as a result of the efficiency and dedication of missionary doctors Habenicht, Westphal, and Hammerly. Patients then came from far and near, giving foot to the enlarging of the facilities and the addition of young doctors, graduated from universities in South America, and nurses, graduated from the School of the Plata nursing program.

=== The Presidents ===
N. Z. Town,
Arthur Fulton,
Dr. R. H. Habenicht,
Walton C. John, 1909
Dr. H. U. Stevens,
Jess S. Marshall,
J. M. Howell,
J. T. Thompson,
Ellis R. Maas,
Dr. Thomas W. Steen,
Fernando Chaij.
(Up to 1949)

== From School to University ==
On December 7, 1990, the Colegio Adventista del Plata transformed into the Universidad Adventista del Plata (UAP), being officially recognised by the National Ministry of Culture and Education (Ministerio de Cultura y Educación de la Nación) via Resolution Nº 2241/90. The UAP is the oldest Adventist educational institution in South America. It has more than 2500 students and offers more than 30 degree programs including theology, social work, psychology, and medicine. The UAP is also a member of Adventist Colleges Abroad and offers a one-year intensive Spanish-speaking program with a diploma of "Spanish as a Second Language" while also providing a variety of cultural tours throughout South America for its program participants.

== Academic divisions ==
The University is composed of the following Schools:

- School of Health Sciences (Facultad de Ciencias de la Salud)
- School of Economic Sciences and Business Administration (Facultad de Ciencias Económicas y de la Administración)
- School of Humanities, Education and Social Sciences (Facultad de Humanidades, Educación y Ciencias Sociales)
- School of Theology (Facultad de Teología)
- Theology Graduate Studies

== Library ==
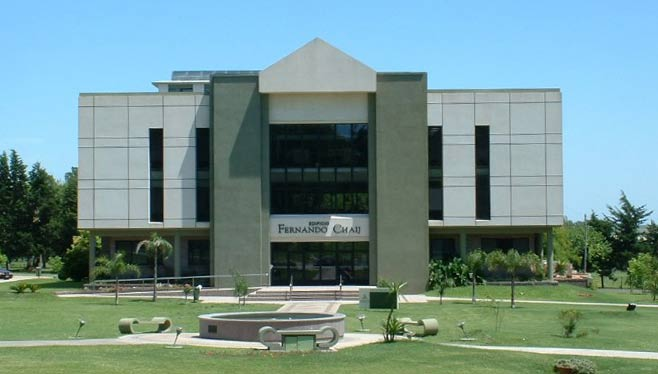
The library at the UAP

The university has the largest and most modern library in the province. It was named in honor to Dr. Fernando Chaij, PhD in Philosophy, who wrote several important books leaving a legacy of humble wisdom, Christian message and example to all generations to come.

== Publications ==
- La Agenda
- Davar Logos
- Signos
- La Voz
- Enfoques
- Sumando

== See also ==
- List of Seventh-day Adventist colleges and universities
- Seventh-day Adventist education
