= Elisabeth Larsson =

Swedish-American obstetrician and gynecologist

Elisabeth Larsson (5 November 1895 – 18 November 1997) was a Swedish-American obstetrician/gynecologist known for her work as a pioneering member of the Medical Women's International Association, her research on cervical cancer and the care of premature infants, and her mentorship of and advocacy for other women physicians.

== Early life and education ==
Larsson was born and raised in Grönviken, Bräcke community, Jämtland west of Sundsvall Municipality, Sweden, the fourth child and first girl raised on her parents' farm. She studied for her high school degree at the Adventist Academy in Jarnboas; she graduated in 1920 and immigrated to the United States. She earned her undergraduate degree at Broadville College in 1926. She studied at Loma Linda University School of Medicine, at the time called the College of Medical Evangelists, and received her M.D. in 1931.

== Career and research ==
Larsson was one of the first women to achieve a three-year residency in obstetrics and gynecology, which she served at the Los Angeles County General Hospital. After her residency, in 1935, she joined the faculty of Loma Linda and began practicing in private practice. She also earned board certification in surgery and obstetrics/gynecology. She left her professorship and became professor emerita in 1963, at the age of 68, though she practiced as a physician until the age of 75, at which point she estimated she had delivered 16,000 babies. She noted that at her final delivery, she had also delivered the mother, father, and anesthesiologist.

== Honors and legacy ==
Larsson was a fellow of the American College of Obstetricians and Gynecologists from 1952 to 1963, a fellow of the American College of Surgeons, an honorary fellow of the Swedish Medical Society in 1958, and a fellow of the Swedish Gynecological Society in 1965.
