= San Timoteo Creek =

River in the southern California, US

San Timoteo Creek San Timoteo Wash
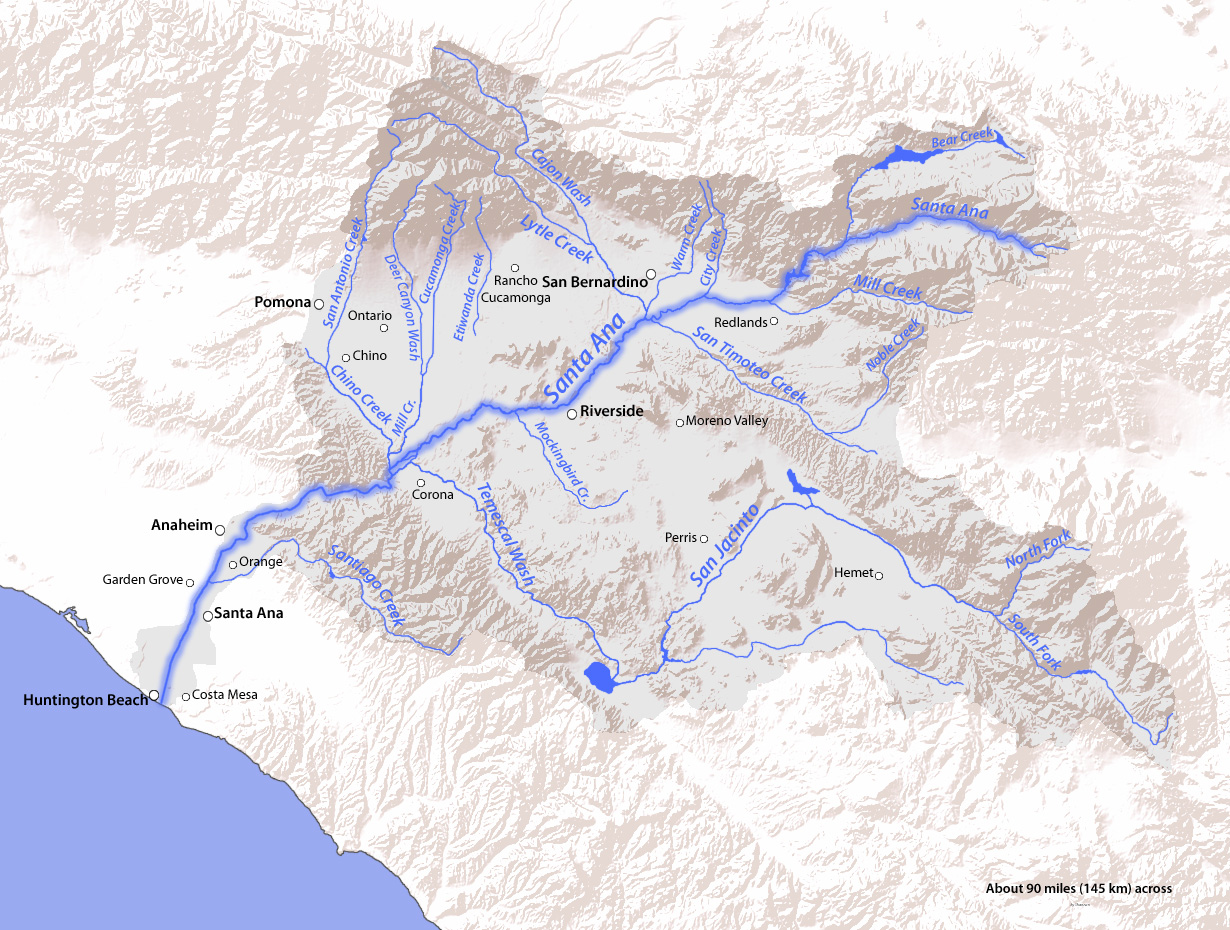
- Map of the Santa Ana River drainage basin

Location
- Country: United States
- State: California
- Counties: San Bernardino, Riverside

Physical characteristics
- Source: Confluence of Little San Antonio Creek and Noble Creek
  - location: San Bernardino Mountains
  - coordinates: 33°56′28″N 117°0′22″W
  - elevation: 2,430 ft (740 m)
- Mouth: Santa Ana River
  - location: Near Loma Linda
  - coordinates: 34°04′10″N 117°16′50″W
  - elevation: 1,004 ft (306 m)
- Basin size: 125 sq mi (320 km^{2})
- Discharge
  - location: near Loma Linda
  - average: 4.29 cu ft/s (0.121 m^{3}/s)
  - minimum: 0 cu ft/s (0 m^{3}/s)
  - maximum: 15,000 cu ft/s (420 m^{3}/s)

Basin features
- Tributaries
  - left: Coopers Creek
  - right: Noble Creek, Little San Gorgonio Creek, Yucaipa Creek

San Timoteo Creek (also called San Timoteo Wash, colloquially known as San Tim) is a stream in Riverside and San Bernardino counties in southern California, United States. A tributary of the Santa Ana River, it flows through San Timoteo Canyon. San Timoteo Creek has a drainage basin of about 125 square miles (320 km^{2}). The creek receives most of its water from headwater tributaries flowing from the San Bernardino Mountains near Cherry Valley, as well as Yucaipa Creek, which flows from Live Oak Canyon.

In the past the creek was intermittent. Today it flows year-round due to agricultural runoff and secondary treatment discharge from a water treatment plant in Yucaipa.

The name "San Timoteo" was given to the creek and canyon around 1830. It is Spanish for Saint Timothy.

== Course ==
San Timoteo Creek is formed by the confluence of Little San Antonio Creek and Noble Creek west of Beaumont. Coopers Creek joins from the southeast just before the San Timoteo enters the San Timoteo Canyon. The San Timoteo flows northwest through San Timoteo Canyon, north of The Badlands in the southern hills of Redlands. Yucaipa Creek, flowing from Live Oak Canyon, joins San Timoteo Creek in San Timoteo Canyon. After the creek leaves the canyon it flows through Bryn Mawr and Loma Linda to its mouth on the Santa Ana River, near the I-10 and I-215 interchange.

== History ==
Historically, San Timoteo Canyon was used as a travel corridor by Native Americans and Spanish ranchers. San Timoteo Canyon Road was used by stage coaches from the 1880s through the 1920s. By the 1910s the road was being used by cars.

A large Native American village used to exist near the mouth of San Timoteo Canyon. Its inhabitants were ultimately incorporated into the Mission San Gabriel Arcángel.

In the 19th century the village of Saahatpa was established in San Timoteo Canyon by Chief Juan Antonio and his band of Cahuilla Indians. The village was abandoned after a devastating smallpox epidemic in 1862–63.

In May 1877 the Southern Pacific Railroad Company completed tracks through San Timoteo Canyon, over San Gorgonio Pass and east to Yuma, Arizona.

During the great Los Angeles flood of 1938, the creek flooded, causing damage and destruction. In 1969, the creek overflowed its banks again, causing damage in Redlands and inundating two-thirds of Loma Linda. Many of the bridges over the creek washed away, and Loma Linda Academy was completely flooded. These floods led to controversial calls for flood control on the creek. The federal government made appropriations for channelization of the entire creek in 1988, but local opposition to the measure was strong. Eventually, a compromise measure was reached, in which the creek was only partially channelized in 2008 by the US Army Corps of Engineers. In 2010, the creek again flooded parts of Loma Linda. In 2013, the Corps of Engineers completed a flood control mitigation project which included maintenance and revegetation.

The creek is a popular local venue for hiking and mountain biking.

=== Flood control and environmental projects ===
Urbanization is occurring rapidly in the San Timoteo watershed, resulting in an increased potential for floods. The United States Army Corps of Engineers has built flood control structures along most of the lower reaches of the creek. A concrete-lined channel runs from the confluence of the Santa Ana River 3.1 mi (5.0 km) upstream. Due to public opposition regarding extending the concrete channel in more upstream portions of San Timoteo Creek, flood control upstream of the concrete section uses a soft-bottom channel through most of the project.

The Environmental Protection Agency, in cooperation with San Bernardino County, Redlands, and Loma Linda, are working to restore sections of San Timoteo Creek's riparian ecosystem to a close approximation of its natural state, while recognizing it is not possible to restore certain reaches to a pristine condition. San Timoteo Creek is one of the few remaining functional wildlife corridors linking the Santa Ana River and Prado Basins on the west with the San Bernardino, San Gorgonio, and San Jacinto Mountains to the east. San Timoteo is one of the last major drainage systems in the inland area of Southern California with some significant remnants of riparian vegetation and habitat.

== See also ==
- Rancho San Jacinto y San Gorgonio
- List of rivers of California
- List of tributaries of the Santa Ana River
