= Leonard Lee Bailey =

American surgeon (1942–2019)

- Born: Leonard Lee Bailey; 28 August 1942; Takoma Park, Maryland, United States
- Died: 12 May 2019 (aged 76); Redlands, California, United States
- Education: Columbia Union College; Loma Linda University
- Known for: transplanting the heart of a baboon into a dying infant in 1984
- Medical career
- Profession: Surgeon
- Institutions: Loma Linda University Medical Center
- Sub-specialties: Cardiothoracic surgery Heart transplantation

Leonard Lee Bailey (1942–2019) was an American surgeon who garnered international media attention in 1984 for transplanting a baboon's heart into a human infant.

Bailey was born on August 28, 1942, in Takoma Park, Maryland. In 1964, he graduated from Columbia Union College, and he earned a medical degree from Loma Linda University, School of Medicine in 1969. During the 1970s, during his residency at Toronto's Hospital for Sick Children, Bailey observed that many children died from congenital heart diseases. This led him to return to Loma Linda University in 1976 as assistant professor at the School of Medicine. There he performed more than 200 experimental heart transplants on young mammals so he could see if there was the possibility of transplantation in young humans.

On October 26, 1984, Bailey and his team at Loma Linda University Medical Center transplanted a baboon's heart into Baby Fae, as she became known to the media. Baby Fae died 21 days later, at age 32 days. Her case is still discussed to this day. Though supported by many, the procedure caused a lot of controversy because it was considered unethical. When asked why he had picked a baboon over a primate more closely related to humans in evolution, Bailey replied, "I don't believe in evolution."

Bailey became recognized for transplantation and all types of pediatric and infant-open heart surgeries. Bailey died on May 12, 2019, of neck and throat cancer.
