= Coomer =

Coomer may refer to:

== People ==
- Amy May Coomer, the birth name of Evelyn West, vedette and burlesque performer
- Christian A. Coomer (born 1974), American lawyer
- Cynara Coomer, Zimbabwean surgeon
- Eric Coomer, a director at Dominion Voting Systems
- James C. Coomer (born 1939), American political scientist
- Joe Coomer (American football) (1917–1979), American football player
- Joe Coomer (author) (born 1958), American author
- Ken Coomer, American drummer
- Ron Coomer (born 1966), American baseball player
- Sven Coomer (1940-2025), Australian modern pentathlete

== Places ==
- Coomer Lake, Rhode Island, US
- Coomer, Wisconsin, US

== Other ==
- Coomer, an internet meme satirizing pornography addicts
- Dr. Coomer, a character in Half-Life VR but the AI Is Self-Aware

== See also ==
- Michael Coomers, American musician and member of Harlem
