= John Burden =

American missionary (1862–1942)

John Allen Burden

Personal details
- Born: 1862 Wisconsin, US
- Died: 1942 (aged 79–80) Loma Linda, California, US
- Occupation: Pastor, missionary, administrator

John Allen Burden (1862 – June 10, 1942) was an American Seventh-day Adventist minister, administrator, and medical missionary instrumental in founding sanitariums, restaurants, and health food factories. He was the founder and first administrator of what is now Loma Linda University.

== Early life ==
Burden was born in Wisconsin in 1862. At the age of nine, Burden attended Seventh-day Adventist meetings for the first time and was introduced to the writings of Ellen G. White, which left a lifelong impression upon him. Five years later, he was baptized. At the age of eighteen in 1880, he moved with his family to Oregon.

== Career ==
Burden became a Seventh-day Adventist minister in Oregon. In 1888, Burden helped establish the Rural Health Retreat (later St. Helena Sanitarium) in Napa, California, becoming its manager in 1891. In 1901, he went to Australia where he helped Merritt G. Kellogg who was founding the Wahroonga Sanitarium (now Sydney Adventist Hospital) in Wahroonga, Sydney.

By March 1904, Burden returned to the United States. Ellen G. White, co-founder of the Seventh-day Adventist Church, encouraged him not to unite with John Harvey Kellogg in Battle Creek, Michigan. Instead, he sought to establish a sanitarium near Los Angeles. Eight miles from the city, he discovered the Glendale Hotel that had cost $60,000 to build in 1886. However, because of local business failures, property value had declined so that he was able to purchase it for $12,500. When it opened in 1905, Burden was the manager of the sanitarium, with his wife as its bookkeeper. The sanitarium prospered under Burden's careful management.

In 1904, Ellen G. White urged for the establishment of another sanitarium in southern California. A resort hotel at Loma Linda was found that was available for $110,000, a price too high. On May 4, 1905, White met with the Burdens and others at the railroad station in Los Angeles on her way to the General Conference Session in Washington, D.C. Burden told her of the property, and she expressed definite interest in it, asking him to write her about it after his next visit to the property. When Burden's letter arrived in Washington, she urged him by telegram to, "secure the property by all means. . . . This is the very property we ought to have. Do not delay; for it is just what is needed".

Borrowing the down payment, Burden succeeded in purchasing the property for $40,000 and was put in charge of the new sanitarium. The final price, with discounts for early payment, came to $38,900. Founded as the College of Medical Evangelists, now Loma Linda University. Burden managed the facilities at Loma Linda until 1915. He was the manager of Paradise Valley Sanitarium from 1916 to 1936.

After his wife died, Burden retired. In 1939, he returned to Loma Linda to serve as chaplain, counseling young medical missionaries and the staff of the College of Medical Evangelists.

== Personal life ==
Burden met Eleanor A. Baxter (1865–1933) as a student at Healdsburg College (now Pacific Union College). They were married in 1888. She served as the matron of the Paradise Valley Sanitarium.

Burden died on June 10, 1942 in Loma Linda, after being hit by a car. He was buried in Glen Abbey Park Cemetery in San Diego, California.

== Legacy ==
The College of Medical Evangelists remains as Loma Linda University. A building on campus, Burden Hall, was named for John Burden.

Burden's personal collection of some 650 pages of Ellen White's letters (half of them addressed to him) was published as Loma Linda Messages (Loma Linda, CA: College of Medical Evangelists, 1934).

== See also ==
- Adventistism
- History of the Seventh-day Adventist Church
- Seventh-day Adventist eschatology
- Seventh-day Adventist theology
- Prophecy in the Seventh-day Adventist Church
