= Untamed Heart =

1993 film by Tony Bill

- Theatrical release poster
- Directed by: Tony Bill
- Written by: Tom Sierchio
- Produced by: Tony Bill; Helen Buck Bartlett
- Starring: Christian Slater; Marisa Tomei; Rosie Perez
- Cinematography: Jost Vacano
- Edited by: Mia Goldman
- Music by: Cliff Eidelman
- Distributed by: Metro-Goldwyn-Mayer
- Release date: February 12, 1993
- Running time: 102 minutes
- Country: United States
- Language: English
- Budget: $6 million
- Box office: $24 million

Untamed Heart is a 1993 American romantic drama film directed by Tony Bill, written by Tom Sierchio, and starring Christian Slater, Marisa Tomei and Rosie Perez. It tells the story of an unlikely romance between a young woman unlucky in love and a shy young man who has a heart defect. The original music score was composed by Cliff Eidelman, and includes a classical arrangement of "Nature Boy". A remix of the 1987 Suzanne Vega song "Tom's Diner" is featured in the opening scene.

== Plot ==
Caroline is a young woman living in Minneapolis. She is a beauty school student and a part-time waitress at a diner. She works with her best friend Cindy, and Adam, a busboy and dishwasher who keeps to himself. One night at work, after Caroline's latest boyfriend breaks up with her, she and Cindy find themselves talking about Adam, whom Cindy confesses is "kinda cute."

Walking home from work one night, Caroline is accosted by two men who attempt to rape her, but Adam shows up and fights them off. Unbeknownst to Caroline, Adam had been following her from a distance every night to make sure she got home safely. The next evening at work, Caroline thanks Adam for coming to her rescue, and he quietly begins to open up about himself to her, bringing the two closer. Caroline later confides in Cindy that she was almost raped and that Adam saved her life, and thus she is now interested in Adam, which Cindy supports.

Things begin looking up for Caroline as she and Adam become a couple: Caroline buys a used car, and Adam is beginning to overcome his shyness. One night the same two men who tried to rape Caroline attack and stab Adam outside the diner. Adam is rushed to the hospital, and Caroline later identifies the perpetrators in a police lineup. While Adam is recovering, Caroline learns that he has a heart defect and will die without a transplant. Adam, claiming that he has a baboon's heart (lovingly told to him by a nun at the orphanage where he grew up), refuses to listen, stating that he is afraid he will no longer be the same person if he gets a transplant. Caroline tries to assure Adam that love comes from a person's mind and soul, but she is deeply touched when Adam asks why it hurts so much "here" (pointing to his own heart) when one's heart is broken.

On his birthday, Caroline visits Adam at his apartment and surprises him by taking him to a Minnesota North Stars hockey game, but Adam surprises her with flowers and a gift that he left for her to be opened only after they return. At the game, Adam catches a stray hockey puck, and on the way home Adam falls asleep next to Caroline, but when they reach his house she discovers to her horror that his heart has given out and he has died in his sleep.

After Adam's funeral, Caroline goes to his apartment and opens his gift for her: a box of his record albums with a handwritten note declaring his love.

== Cast ==
- Marisa Tomei as Caroline
- Christian Slater as Adam
- Rosie Perez as Cindy
- Kyle Secor as Howard
- Willie Garson as Patsy
- Claudia Wilkens as Mother Camilla
- James Cada as Bill #1
- Gary Groomes as Bill #2
- Charley Bartlett as young Adam
- Vincent Kartheiser as orphan boy
- John Beasley as cook
- Steve Cochran as Stromboli
- Tom Sierchio as Ronnie

== Production ==
=== Development ===
Tony Bill discovered Tom Sierchio's screenplay for Untamed Heart during one of his talent searches: he had asked an agent at William Morris to send him screenplays from new writers. Originally, Sierchio's screenplay had been submitted as a writer's sample. Bill showed the screenplay to producer Helen Bartlett who suggested that they option it. Within two weeks of Sierchio handing his script to his agent, MGM had greenlighted the project. The film was originally titled The Baboon Heart in honor of an infant named Baby Fae who received a cross-species heart transplant from a baboon to fix a congenital heart defect.

=== Casting ===
Initially, Bill had not considered Christian Slater for the role of Adam, but he eventually became "the obvious choice" for the director. For the role of Caroline, Bill remembered Marisa Tomei auditioning for his earlier film, 1987's Five Corners. Tomei's newfound success with My Cousin Vinny helped in her casting.

=== Filming ===
Sierchio's screenplay was originally set in New Jersey, but for logistical reasons they could not shoot there. The filmmakers considered finding a location to double for the state, but while Bill, Bartlett, and Sierchio were scouting in Minneapolis, they realized it was an ideal location because of its strong acting community (they cast 35 of the film's 40 roles from it) and a large commercial production community that allowed them to utilize a mostly local crew.

The city's locations were also a strong factor in deciding to shoot there. The centerpiece was Jim's Coffee Shop & Bakery, which actually existed at the time of production but was closed to the public for the duration of shooting the film. Bill said, "It had a wonderful combination of ingredients from every diner you've ever been to; we've done very little to change it for the film. In fact, we changed the original name of the diner in the script to reflect that it is Jim's."

Principal photography began in March 1992 amidst cold temperatures. Because several winter scenes were shot in May, fake snow was used to give the appearance of winter weather. One scene was shot at the Met Center, the home of the then-Minnesota North Stars (now the Dallas Stars) at the time. Tomei wanted to have a believable regional accent and had her driver Craig Kittelson double act as her dialogue coach.

== Reception ==
=== Critical reception ===
Untamed Heart received mixed reviews and has a 58% rating on Rotten Tomatoes based on 26 reviews. On Metacritic, the film has a 59 out of 100 from 26 critics.

In a three-star review, film critic Roger Ebert wrote that the film was "kind of sweet and kind of goofy, and works because its heart is in the right place". Hal Hinson of The Washington Post said that the film "is hopelessly syrupy, preposterous and more than a little bit lame, but, still, somehow it got to me". Vincent Canby of The New York Times said the film "is to the mind what freshly discarded chewing gum is to the sole of a shoe: an irritant that slows movement without any real danger of stopping it".

Many critics opined that the actors saved the film from overwrought sentimentality, leaden dialogue and implausible plotting. Much of the praise in particular went to Marisa Tomei's performance. Owen Gleiberman of Entertainment Weekly gave the film a "B−" rating and wrote, "if Untamed Heart is often too precious for words, there’s one thing in it that feels miraculously fresh…Marisa Tomei, who follows up her rollicking caricature of a streetwise Italian dish in My Cousin Vinny by proving that she’s a major actress…rescues her role through sheer eagerness. She gazes at Slater with such ardor and delight that he’s transformed, and so is the audience."

Peter Rainer of the Los Angeles Times said Tomei "pulls you into Caroline’s spunky despair without ever condescending to the character". In his review for The New Yorker, Anthony Lane praised Tomei for bringing "startling high spirits to a dullish role. She snatches moments of happiness out of the air and shares them out to anyone who's around". Hinson added, “when Slater and Tomei are alone together, their exchanges are so shyly affectionate, so sweet, that they soften the hardest hearts".

Of Slater, Rainer said he "does an impressive job of burying most of his Christian Slater-isms. Gone are the wily Jack Nicholson-ish line readings and smart-aleck scruffiness", while Ebert wrote he "projects the right note of mystery and doomed romance". Rolling Stone's Peter Travers wrote, "The Rain Man-Dying Young elements in Tom Sierchio's script are pitfalls that Slater dodges with a wonderfully appealing performance."

Mike Clark, in his review for USA Today, wrote, "Director Tony Bill (My Bodyguard) is adept both in the yarn's meticulous buildup and in his handling of the actors". Travers concluded "it's Tomei and [Rosie] Perez who give Untamed Heart its buoyant wit. Their friendship could have sustained an entire movie".

=== Box office ===
The film grossed $19 million in the United States and Canada and $5 million overseas for a worldwide total of $24 million.

== Home media ==
Untamed Heart had an original VHS release on May 22, 1993. MGM Home Entertainment released a DVD on June 9, 2001. Kino Lorber released a Blu-ray on March 5, 2019.
