= Donna Franklin =

African-American scholar and author

- Education: University of Southern California
- Occupation: Author
- Known for: Ensuring Inequality

Donna LaVonne Franklin is an African-American social scientist and author, and a nationally recognized scholar on African American families.

== Early life and education ==
Franklin was born to Donald A. Franklin and Helen Kirkpatrick Franklin in Los Angeles, California. When she was young, her parents moved to La Sierra, California (later annexed to the City of Riverside). She attended elementary school and began high school in Riverside.

For her last years of high school Franklin transferred to the co-educational African American boarding school Pine Forge Academy, located in Berks County, Pennsylvania. The campus was built on land once owned by Thomas Rutter, an abolitionist iron miller, and was a terminal for the Underground Railroad during the closing days of the Civil War.

Franklin graduated from Loma Linda University with a BA in sociology, and holds a Master's in social work and a PhD from the University of Southern California.

== Career ==
Franklin was the first African American woman to be appointed at the assistant professor level at the University of Chicago School of Social Administration, in 1982. She was recruited by Dolores Norton, a graduate of Temple University and Bryn Mawr, who was the first African American woman to be tenured at the University of Chicago.

During Franklin's tenure at the University of Chicago, she was a co-investigator on a multimillion-dollar research project that focused on urban poverty and family structure. Primarily, her interests included how social and structural processes interact to influence an adolescent female's decisions regarding sexuality and pregnancy. Six years later, Franklin was promoted to associate professor.

In 1994, Franklin accepted the John Milner Visiting Professor appointment at the University of Southern California. From 1997 to 2008, she taught Advanced Social Theory at Smith College, a required course in the doctoral program at Smith's School for Social Work. Franklin has also held academic appointments at Howard and Tuskegee universities.

Franklin was one of the first national co-chairs of the Council on Contemporary Families, from 1997 to 1999, and has also served on its board of directors. She retired from academic life to focus on writing in 2008.

== Publications ==
=== Books ===
Franklin's first book, Ensuring Inequality: The Structural Transformation of the African American Family, was based on her research at University of Chicago and included a foreword by William Julius Wilson, a Harvard University Professor and recipient of the National Medal of Science. Published by Oxford University Press in 1997, Ensuring Inequality won the American Sociological Association's William J. Goode Distinguished Book Award; She was the first African-American author to win this award.

Franklin's second book, What's Love Got to Do With It: Understanding and Healing the Rift Between Black Men and Women, was published by Simon & Schuster in 2000. It examines the history and tensions of gender relations in the African American community.

Franklin is currently working on a memoir with the working title From Slavery to Freedom: A Memoir of an American Family and Myself.

=== Other publications ===
Franklin has contributed essays to two anthologies. "African Americans and the Birth of the Modern Marriage" is included in Families As They Really Are, a collection penned by an interdisciplinary community of experts who study and work with families.

"The Obama Marriage: A Model for Moving Forward the 'Stalled Revolution'" appears in Obama on Our Minds: The Impact of Obama on the Psyche of America. Published in 2016, the book was written by multicultural theorists and researchers, who delve into President Barack Obama's success and societal impact.

Among other chapters, academic papers, and shorter pieces, Franklin has penned an op-ed published in the New York Times entitled "Black Herstory." Written in the wake of the Million Man March, the piece outlines the distinctive "herstory" of black women's equality with black men (compared to other American women) following their emancipation from slavery and its aftermath, and argues that, consequently, black women should have been included in the march.

== Family background ==
On her father's side, Franklin is descended from one of the first African American families to settle in California's San Gabriel Valley. Approximately 50 members of the Franklin family are buried in the historic Savannah Memorial Park in Rosemead.

Franklin's great-grandfather Lawrence (usually called Harry) was born in the state about 1864. Her paternal great-grandmother, Sabra Ann Hardison, was born a slave in the township of Jamesville, North Carolina, around the beginning of the Civil War. Sabra Ann came to California as a domestic servant to members of the family of Gail Borden Jr. (inventor of condensed milk), and settled in the San Gabriel Valley.

Sabra Ann met Harry shortly after she arrived, a consequence of the two being among the few African Americans in the area. Harry spoke fluent Spanish and was at the time employed by the sheriff in El Monte. Sabra Ann and Harry married on October 2, 1886, and lived out their lives in Alhambra, California.

== Personal life ==
Franklin was married to historian and playwright Bart McSwine from 1971 to 1982. She is the mother of one daughter, Myisha Karimah McSwine, and one grandson, Malo Kagen McSwine.
