= Cynara Coomer =

- Born: Harare, Zimbabwe
- Education: Loma Linda University (M.D.), California Polytechnic University San Luis Obispo (B.S.)
- Occupations: Breast Surgeon, Fox News Channel Medical Contributor
- Spouse(s): Jonathan Deitch, MD

Cynara Coomer is the Chief of Breast Surgery and Director of the Comprehensive Breast Center at Staten Island University Hospital and a Fox News medical contributor. She is also an assistant clinical professor of surgery specializing in breast health and breast cancer surgery at Mount Sinai School of Medicine in New York City. Coomer is the recipient of several awards including the Patient’s Choice Award and America’s Top Surgeons.

== Medical background ==
Coomer is board certified in general surgery and a fellow of the American College of Surgeons. She specializes in performing nipple-sparing and areola-sparing mastectomies with immediate reconstruction. She is also experienced in providing partial breast radiation.

A native of South Africa, Coomer completed her medical school degree in 1996 at Loma Linda University School of Medicine in Southern California. She fulfilled her surgical residency at SUNY Downstate Health Sciences Medical Center. Soon after, she was appointed an Assistant Professor of Surgery there.

Before coming to Staten Island University Hospital, Coomer was a breast surgeon at Mount Sinai Medical Center and Lenox Hill Hospital in New York City. At both hospitals she established a clinical practice devoted to treating breast diseases of all kinds, both benign and malignant.

She is also affiliated with a number of professional societies like the American Society of Breast Surgeons and the Metropolitan Breast Cancer group.

== Journalism ==
Coomer joined Fox News Channel as a medical contributor in May 2009. She provides expertise on a variety of topics in cancer research with a focus on women's health. She also appears as a contributor on WNYW-FOX 5 News and as a medical reporter, host and blogger for FoxNewsHealth.com.

Coomer appears regularly on America Live, America's Newsroom, Fox & Friends, Fox Report with Shepard Smith, Happening Now, Red Eye with Greg Gutfeld, Studio B with Shepard Smith, The O’Reilly Factor and Your World with Neil Cavuto.

== Thyroid cancer ==
Coomer was diagnosed with papillary carcinoma, which is the most common form of thyroid cancer, in December 2010. She underwent a total thyroidectomy where her surgeon, Mark Urken, removed her thyroid gland and several lymph nodes. The prognosis for this type of cancer is quite good with an 80-90 percent survival rate. She wrote several columns about her experience for Fox News. In February 2011 she was treated for thyroid cancer with radioactive iodine.
