= Village development committee =

Village development committee may refer to:

- Village development committee (India)
- Village development committee (Nepal)
