= Baby Fae =

American xenotransplantee (1984)

- Baby Fae, shortly after her transplant. The dark stripe on her torso is the surgical incision.
- Born: Stephanie Fae Beauclair; October 14, 1984
- Died: November 15, 1984 (aged 32 days); Loma Linda, California, U.S.
- Cause of death: Transplant rejection complications
- Known for: First infant subject of a xenotransplant procedure

Stephanie Fae Beauclair (October 14 – November 15, 1984), better known as Baby Fae, was an American infant born in 1984 with hypoplastic left heart syndrome. On October 26, 1984, she became the first infant subject of a xenotransplant procedure and the first successful infant heart transplant, receiving the heart of a baboon. Though she died on November 15, within a month of the procedure, she lived weeks longer than any previous recipient of a non-human heart.

== Procedure ==
The procedure, performed by Leonard Lee Bailey at Loma Linda University Medical Center, was successful, but Fae died 21 days later of heart failure due to rejection of the transplant. The rejection is thought to have been caused largely by a humoral response against the graft, due to Fae's type O blood creating antibodies against the type AB xenograft. The blood type incompatibility was seen as unavoidable: fewer than 1% of baboons are type O, and Loma Linda only had seven young female baboons—all of which were type AB—available as potential donors.

A baboon heart was used as there was no time for a suitable human heart to be found. It was hoped that the transplant could be replaced by an allograft at a later date, before Fae's body began generating isohaemagglutinins, but a suitable donor could not be found in time. Prior to the procedure, no infant heart transplant—even with human hearts—had been successfully performed due to a lack of infant human hearts. To address this issue, Bailey had become a pioneer in the research of cross-species heart transplants, which had included "more than 150 transplants in sheep, goats, and baboons".

Multiple surgeons had previously experimented with baboon heart implants, leading some to speculate that baboons could be farmed in the future for such purposes. When asked why he had picked a baboon over a primate which had a closer evolutionary relationship to humans, Bailey replied, "I don't believe in evolution." Though she died within a month, Baby Fae, at the time of her death, had lived two weeks longer than any previous recipient of a non-human heart.

== Ethics ==
The procedure was subject to a wide ethical and legal debate, but the attention that it generated is thought to have paved the way for Bailey to perform the first successful infant allograft heart transplant a year later. The Baby Fae case, and Bailey's role in it, has been a popular case study in the realm of medical ethics. There were questions as to whether parents should be allowed to volunteer children for experimental medical procedures, and whether the parents themselves were properly informed by Bailey.

The case further brought up debates regarding the risk/benefit ratio that should be considered ethical when dealing with experimental procedures on human subjects. Charles Krauthammer, writing in Time, said the Baby Fae case was totally within the realm of experimentation and was "an adventure in medical ethics". Ultimately, the American Medical Association and top medical journals criticized Bailey, concluding that xenografts should be undertaken only as part of a systematic research program with controls in randomized clinical trials. The validity of the consent obtained in the case of Baby Fae has also been largely criticized. Bailey originally alleged that he obtained consent following a long discussion with the mother and father. It was later revealed, however, that the father was not present at the time of consent. The information in the consent form was also changed after the mother originally saw it. The original phrasing stated that the procedure could potentially extend Baby Fae's life "long term".

Although Fae's full name was not made public at the time of the procedure, her mother chose to reveal it in 1997.

== In popular culture ==
The Paul Simon song "The Boy in the Bubble" from the 1986 Graceland album references her in the lyrics: "Medicine is magical and magical is art / Thinking of the Boy in the Bubble / And the baby with the baboon heart."

In the 1993 episode "I Love Lisa" of The Simpsons, the school cafeteria serves beef hearts in honor of Valentine's Day. Bart Simpson puts one under his shirt, exclaiming "My baboon heart! Body ... rejecting it!" before dramatically everting it onto the table.

Christian Slater's character in the 1993 film Untamed Heart was inspired by Baby Fae, and the film was originally titled The Baboon Heart in tribute to her. Screenwriter Tom Serchio later said that when writing the screenplay, he was thinking less of Baby Fae directly and that it was more about being intrigued by the Paul Simon song and the lyrics that reference her.

In the 2010 episode "The Silent Partners" of the Adult Swim cartoon, The Venture Bros., Billy Quizboy refers to Monstroso as "Baby Fae" before performing experimental heart surgery on him, transplanting Monstroso's failing heart with the heart of the recently deceased villain, King Gorilla.

In second season of Stranger Things, the Halloween edition of The Hawkins Post has a paragraph entitled "Baby Fae's baboon heart".

== See also ==
- Boyd Rush, 1964 recipient of the first heart transplant, which was taken from a chimpanzee
- Louis Washkansky, 1967 recipient of the first human heart transplant
- David Bennett Sr., 2022 recipient of a genetically modified pig heart transplant.

== Sources ==
- Adventist news Network 25th-anniversary retrospective - http://news.adventist.org/2009/10/surgeon-bailey-refle.html
- Wallis, Claudia (November 12, 1984). "Baby Fae Stuns the World". Time.
- Emmy Award-winning documentary Stephanie's Heart: The Story of Baby Fae in two parts.
- Bailey, LL; Nehlsen-Cannarella, SL; Concepcion, W; Jolley, WB (1985). "Baboon-to-human cardiac xenotransplantation in a neonate". JAMA. 254 (23): 3321–9. doi:10.1001/jama.1985.03360230053022. PMID 2933538.
