= Loma Linda University Medical Center =

Hospital in California, United States

- Loma Linda University Health
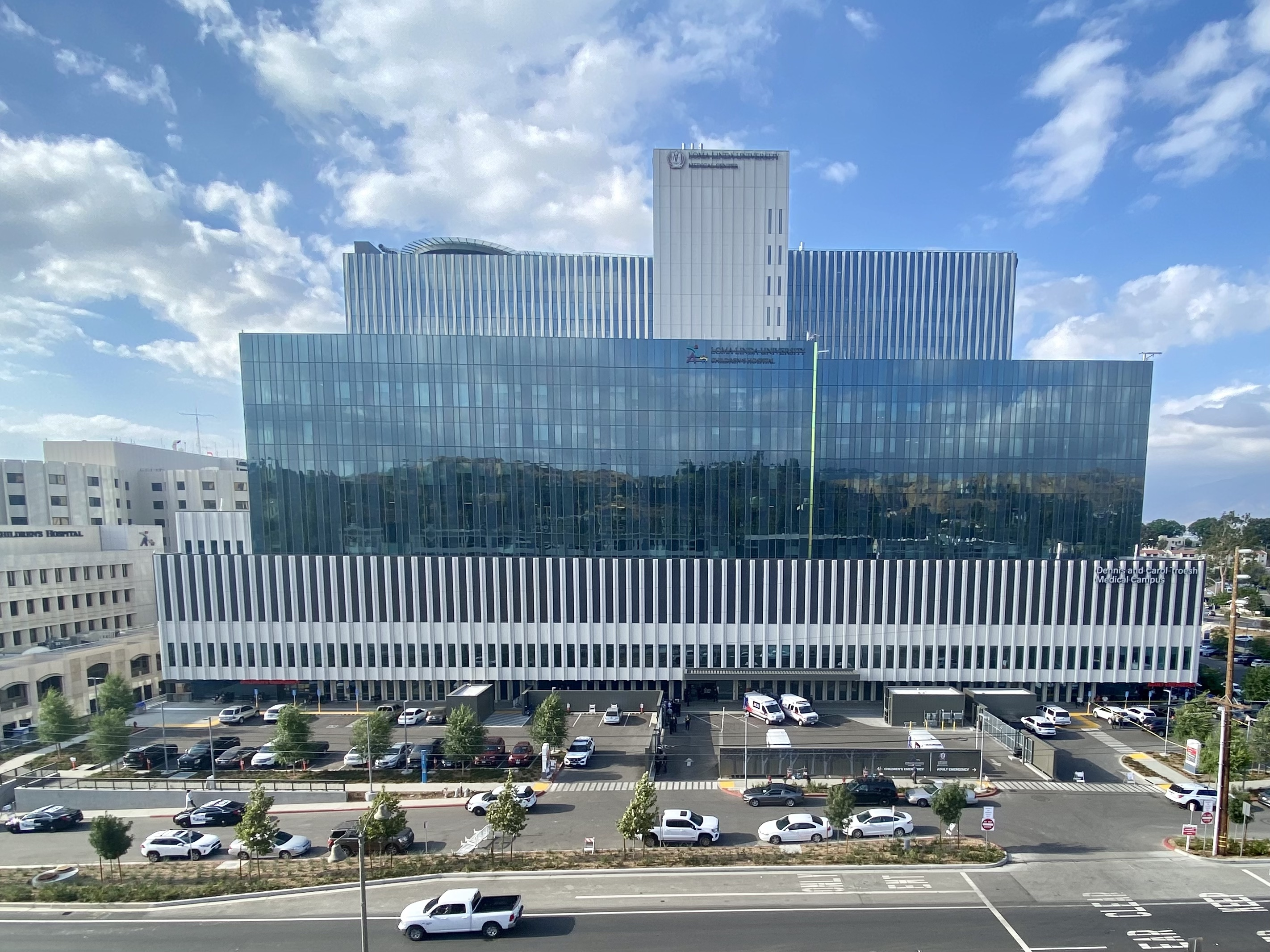

Geography
- Location: Loma Linda, California, United States
- Coordinates: 34°03′09″N 117°15′51″W

Organization
- Care system: Private
- Type: Teaching hospital
- Religious affiliation: Seventh-day Adventist Church
- Affiliated university: Loma Linda University

Services
- Emergency department: Level I Adult Trauma Center / Level I Pediatric Trauma Center
- Beds: 1,077

Helipads
- Helipad: FAA LID: 94CL

History
- Founded: 1905

Links
- Website: lluh.org/locations/loma-linda-university-medical-center
- Lists: Hospitals in California

Loma Linda University Medical Center (LLUMC) is a teaching hospital in California's Inland Empire region. Opened in 1905, it is a level 1 trauma center and is staffed by nearly 900 faculty physicians and over 1,000 beds.

The main tower of the center was built in 1967 and is 9 stories high. At 16 stories, the new towers (built in 2021) are one of the tallest buildings in the Inland Empire. Because of its height and white coloration, it is possible to view the main hospital building from various locations around the San Bernardino valley and mountains.

Loma Linda University Medical Center made international news on October 26, 1984, when Leonard Lee Bailey transplanted a baboon heart into Baby Fae, an infant born with a severe heart defect known as hypoplastic left heart syndrome. Baby Fae died a few weeks later; however, this effort led to the successful infant heart transplant program, with transplantation of human-to-human infant transplants. LLUMC is home to the Venom E.R., which specializes in snake bites.

== Children's hospital ==
Loma Linda University Children's Hospital is the sole children's hospital for almost 1.3 million of California's youth (San Bernardino, Riverside, Inyo, and Mono Counties). The hospital provides comprehensive pediatric specialties and subspecialties to infants, children, teens, and young adults aged 0–21 throughout the region.

== Surgical hospital ==
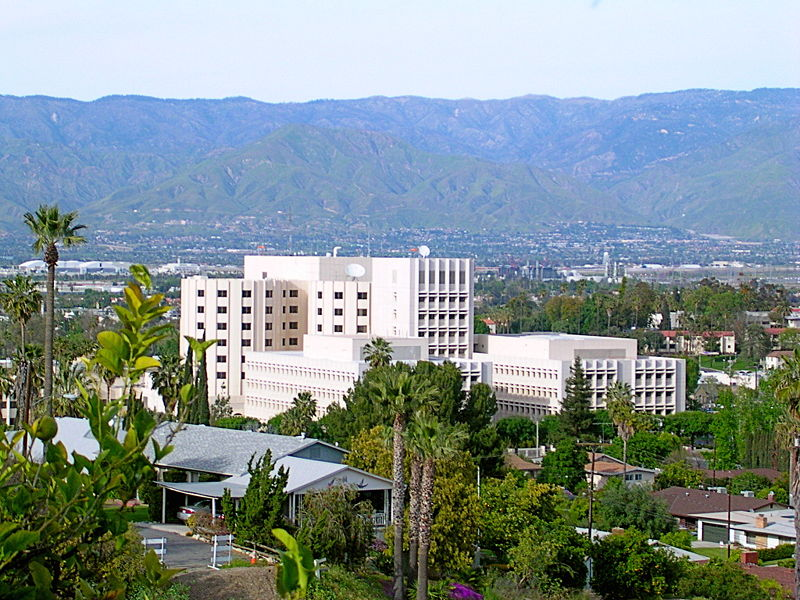
Loma Linda Medical Center before the seismic upgrade

In May 2008, it was announced that LLUMC had been in talks since December and had finalized a buyout of the 28-bed California Heart and Surgical Center located approximately two miles east of the main campus on the border of Loma Linda and Redlands, California. This was a marked departure of their previous position of opposition to the facility when it was first proposed in 2005. The Heart and Surgical Center would have been a for-profit facility while the Loma Linda is a non-profit facility and it was feared by area hospitals, including Loma Linda, that the Heart and Surgical Center would take all the paying patients. However, Loma Linda finalized the construction and furnishing of the center and in January 2009, they received state approval to open and begin operations as Loma Linda University Heart & Surgical Hospital.

== Seismic upgrade project ==
After a major seismic upgrade project headed by Turner Construction Company, which included reinforcing the main building to bring it up to California state standards, Linda University Medical Center became the tallest hospital in California as well as the tallest building in San Bernardino County.

== See also ==
- List of Seventh-day Adventist hospitals
- List of hospitals in California
