= Loma Linda University Church =

Loma Linda University Church of Seventh-day Adventists
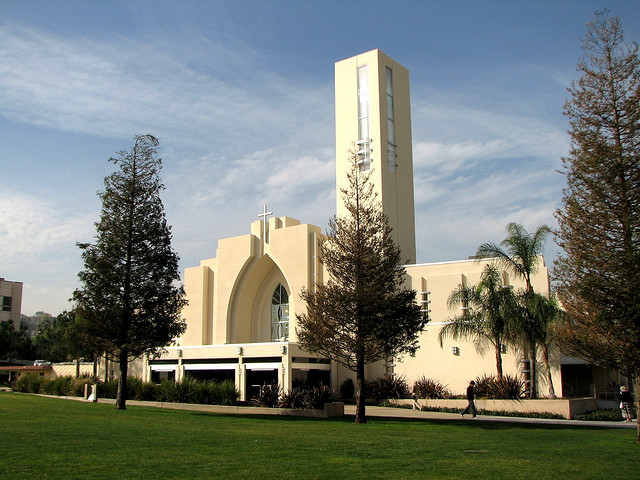
- Main building

- 34°3.084′N 117°15.89796′W
- Location: Loma Linda University; 11125 Campus Street; Loma Linda, California
- Country: United States
- Denomination: Seventh-day Adventist
- Website: www.lluc.org

History
- Founded: December 29, 1928

Architecture
- Functional status: Active
- Architectural type: Church

Administration
- Division: North American Division

Clergy
- Pastor(s): Tim Rawson, Stew Harty, Joey Oh, Adrian Presley, Joelle Reuer

Loma Linda University Church of Seventh-day Adventists is a Seventh-day Adventist church on the Loma Linda University campus in Loma Linda, California, United States. By membership, it is the largest Adventist church in the world, with about 6,400 members. The main auditorium has a seating capacity of 1,200.

The church hosts two weekly worship services, Sabbath School, and vespers programs on Saturday, which are broadcast live on the Loma Linda Broadcasting Network, as well as weekly programs for the university. There are often mid-week evening Bible study services in the Campus Chapel.

== Anthem ==
Anthem is the contemporary service of the church. The gathering features the same teaching from Senior Pastor Randy Roberts with worship. The gathering has also released original music under the name Anthem Worship.
