= Virtual Digital Cable =

US multichannel video distributor

VDC Corporation
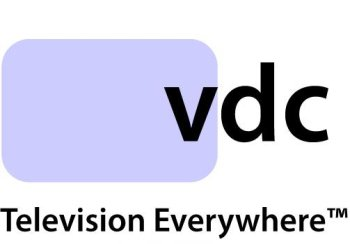
- Type: Private
- Industry: Television, Internet Television, IPTV, Streaming Media
- Founded: Highland Park, Illinois, USA (2010)
- Fate: Ceased operations
- Headquarters: Northbrook, Illinois, US
- Products: Cablecasting, Television on the Desktop, IPTV

VDC Corporation was a distributor of multichannel video programming that delivered live cable television through broadband connected computers in the United States. They developed and were involved in the distribution and delivery of live cable television programming channels.

== History ==
VDC Corporation was founded in 2002 by Scott Wolf. VDC was a pioneer in the delivery of live cable programming to mobile devices. The company transitioned its mobile product to the delivery of live cable television to desktop computers with their Virtual Digital Cable service launched in April 2006. In October 2006, VDC became one of the first providers to utilize the Microsoft Silverlight technology to provide secure, live distribution of streaming television.

In January 2007, VDC made public its decision to file a program-access complaint with the FCC to commence a proceeding to obtain enforcement of the program access rules under the 1992 Cable TV Consumer Protection Act, to ensure vertically integrated programming providers sell their programming to VDC. Such providers include Time Warner (CNN, TNT, TBS, Cartoon Network, HBO), Liberty Media, (Discovery Channel), Cablevision (Rainbow) and Comcast (E!, Golf Channel).

In late January 2010, the company had posted a notice on their website stating that they had ceased offering subscriptions pending the FCC's decision on their program-access complaint. This remained in place at least until July 2011; the website has since been replaced by a generic domain parking page.

== Controversies ==
Congress attempted to encourage growth and competition in the vertically integrated cable marketplace with the 1992 Cable TV Consumer Protection Act. Using the internet, VDC claims to have brought diversity and increased competition to the marketplace:

The term 'multichannel video programming distributor' means an entity engaged in the business of making available for purchase, by subscribers or customers, multiple channels of video programming. Such entities include, but are not limited to, a cable operator, a multichannel multipoint distribution service, a direct broadcast satellite service, a television receive-only satellite program distributor, and a satellite master antenna television system operator, as well as buying groups or agents of all such entities.

VDC's complaint with the FCC was filed against Turner Broadcasting System to force Turner into compliance with the 1992 Cable Act and to recognize VDC as an MVPD. This would grant VDC mandatory access to broadcast Turner's programming on VDC's MVPD system.

The FCC debate also raises regulatory and broadcast issues involving net neutrality.
