= Loma Linda University =

Private university in Loma Linda, California

- Motto: To make man whole
- Type: Private health sciences university
- Established: 1905
- Accreditation: WSCUC
- Religious affiliation: Seventh-day Adventist Church
- Endowment: $1.346 billion (2024)
- President: Anthony Hilliard
- Provost: Paul Herrmann
- Administrative staff: 1,068
- Undergraduates: 960
- Postgraduates: 2,467
- Location: Loma Linda, California, United States; 34.053°N 117.261°W
- Campus: Suburban
- Website: www.llu.edu

Loma Linda University (LLU) is a private Seventh-day Adventist health sciences university in Loma Linda, California. As of 2019, the university comprises eight schools and a Faculty of Graduate Studies. It is a part of the Seventh-day Adventist education system. The university is accredited by the WASC Senior College and University Commission (WSCUC). Its on-campus church has around 7,000 members.

== History ==
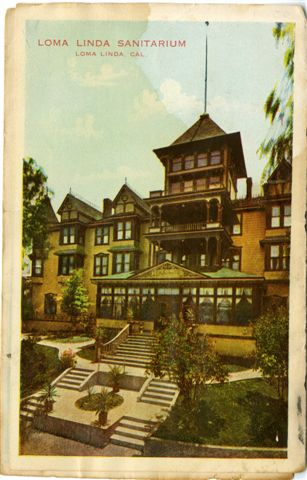
Early postcard of Loma Linda Sanitarium

=== Beginnings ===
Loma Linda University had its beginning in 1905 when Seventh-day Adventists John Burden and Ellen G. White founded what became known as the Loma Linda Sanitarium.

In February 1906, a council of church workers met at Loma Linda. It consisted of the faculty of Fernando Academy, the faculty of the Loma Linda school, and the executive committee of the Southern California Conference.

In 1906, The Loma Linda College of Evangelists was established. Courses included:

- Religion: Bible Evangelism, Acts and Epistles, Missionary Methods, and Doctrines and Prophecies
- General: History, Languages, Mathematics, English, Music, Piano and Organ
- Industrial: Science of Gardening, Practical Gardening, Electrical Mechanics, Carpentry, Cookery, Accounting, Sewing
- Nursing/Medical: Chemistry and Anatomy, Children's Diseases, Physiology, Obstetrics, Gynecology, Hydrotherapy, Practical Nursing and Hydrotherapy

The 1910 Seventh-day Adventist Yearbook enters the school as 'Loma Linda College'. It adds the legal title, 'College of Medical Evangelists of Loma Linda' (CME), and notes that the school was chartered as a Medical College in 1909.

=== 1910 to 1919 ===
==== Early clinical developments ====
From 1913 to 1962, the university taught basic sciences in Loma Linda, but sent its students to Los Angeles for clinical experience. Ellen White promoted rural settings for Adventist schools, but to train medical students, the school needed clinical experience. Loma Linda Sanitarium did not have such a clinic. The American Medical Association would not recognize the medical college if it did not provide adequate clinical experience for its students.

In 1905, the American Medical Association formed a national Council on Medical Education. Dr. Nathan Porter Colwell (1870–1936) became its first secretary the next year. In reaction, Adventists leaders interested in developing the medical school met with Dr. Colwell. He visited the campus and gave counsel on how to proceed. E. E. Andross, president of the Pacific Union Conference of Seventh-day Adventists and chairman of the board for the College of Medical Evangelists, reported on a special meeting of the constituency of the college convened at Loma Linda, January 27, 1913. A large number of General Conference men were in California at time. Andross called this meeting in order to benefit from their counsel. In his report, he wrote that a medical hospital and dispensary was needed to address accreditation requirements for the future medical education at the institution. On September 29, 1913, the College of Medical Evangelists opened the First Street Dispensary in the heart of Los Angeles.

==== World War I and a 'B' Rating ====
The United States federal government exempted medical students from the military draft. But they would only recognize 'A' and 'B' rated medical schools. The College of Medical Evangelists only had a 'C' rating. California state authorities supported a higher rating, and after a nationwide effort, Percy T. Magan and colleagues persuaded Dr. Colwell to visit the school and determine whether a 'B' rating could be given. After the AMA's visit, the rating was upgraded to 'B'. Medical students who had already left for their military duties returned to finish their medical training. Margaret Rossiter White, Historical Records Librarian at Loma Linda, wrote at the time that it was a tremendous victory for Loma Linda.

=== 1919–1960 ===
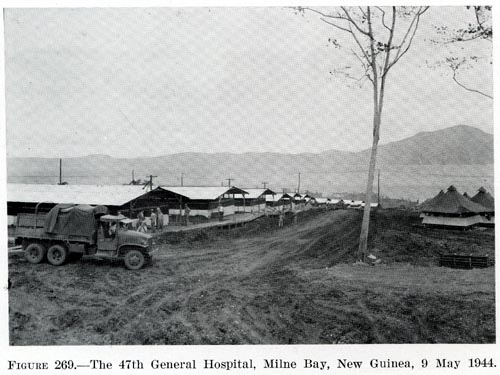
LLU's 47 General Hospital, Milne Bay

On November 16, 1922, Dr. Colwell reported that the Council on Medical Education had granted an 'A' rating to the College of Medical Evangelists.

The medical world, under the leadership of the American Medical Association, was quickly developing standards for medical education and for the quality of hospitals. The requirements for accreditation developed as well. The July 12, 1923 Review and Herald presented the addresses given at the Educational Convention held at Colorado Springs from June 5–19, 1923. In an article entitled 'Separation from the World in Education', W.E. Howell, former president of the Loma Linda College of Evangelists (1906) and at the time of the article, the Secretary, or director, of the SDA General Conference Education Department expressed concern for where dependence on accreditation would lead Adventist schools. During World War II, the CME sponsored the 47th General Hospital.

=== 1960–1980 ===
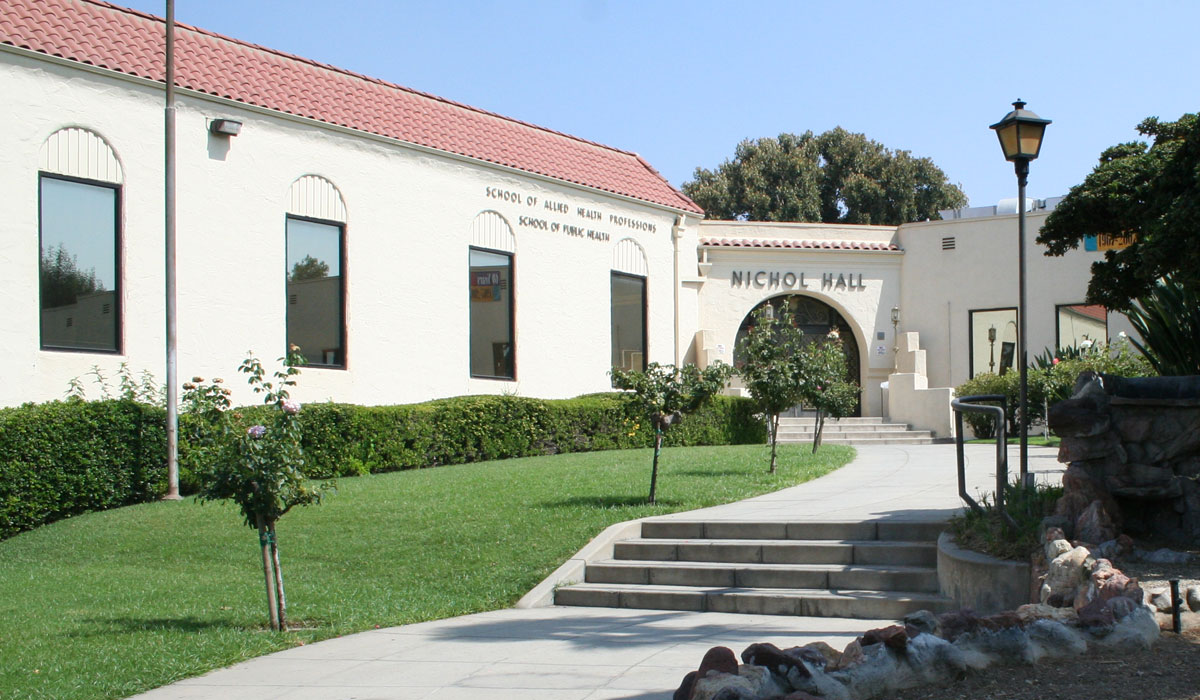
Nichol Hall

==== University status and name change ====
In 1961, college leaders voted to convert the institution to a university and renamed the institution after the city. All its science and clinical faculties were consolidated within the city of Loma Linda by 1962.

On July 9, 1967, the university opened the Loma Linda University Medical Center with more than 125 patients from the old community hospital. The university also operated the Seventh-day Adventist liberal arts college in Riverside from 1967 to 1990, which is now known as La Sierra University.

In 1980, the state designated LLU the only Level I trauma center in San Bernardino, Riverside, Inyo and Mono counties, which comprise more than a fourth of the state's land mass. About 1,600 emergency helicopters land there each year.

=== 1980–2011 ===
In 1991, B. Lyn Behrens became the first female president of LLU. Serving until March 2008, she was succeeded by Richard Hart, who had previously served as LLU's chancellor.

Loma Linda University opened its new 150,000-square-foot (14,000 m^{2}) Centennial Complex on October 28, 2009. The complex includes new classrooms, two large 200–400 seat amphitheaters and more than 100 workstations with labs for dental, medical, physical therapy and graduate students. Updated technology allows the university to link to areas around the globe. Additionally, the complex houses simulation labs where students can practice medical skills on live actors and sophisticated robotic mannequins. The complex was expected to bump up the university's growth by 25 percent from its current enrollment of 4,000 students to 5,000 students by 2010.

== Grants and funding ==
The university applies for and receives grants from various organizations. Some of the research grants include:

- California Walnut Commission for walnut research
- Pfizer Public Health & Government Group for public health television and Internet programming
- NSF Partnership for Innovation Grant in partnership with the Larta Institute

=== Federal government support ===
The special relationship between Loma Linda University and Representative Jerry Lewis, R – San Bernardino, first came to light in a Pulitzer Award-winning expose written by Jerry Kammer. Lewis has lent significant help in funding important school operations. From 1998 to 2003, Loma Linda has received $167.2 million in federal funds, the number one academic recipient in the country receiving nearly $60 million more than the runner up, the University of South Florida. In 2000, it was the single largest recipient of higher education grants at $36 million. Several grants were from the Department of Defense, plus $5 million from NASA for space radiation research. Critics point out that the brother of Lewis is employed by Loma Linda University. In 2008, Loma Linda University received nearly $9.5 million of which $5 million came from the Department of Defense.

== School of Public Health ==
The Loma Linda University School of Public Health was founded in 1967. The school is an accredited member of the Association of Schools of Public Health (ASPH). The School of Public Health offers a Master of Science (MS), Master of Public Health (MPH), Doctor of Public Health (DrPH), and certificates.

== School of Behavioral Health ==
The Loma Linda University School of Behavioral Health was created in 2012 and includes the following departments:

- Counseling and Family Sciences: Child Life Specialist (MS), Counseling (MS), Drug and Alcohol Counseling (Certificate Online), Marital and Family Therapy (MS Online or On-Campus, DMFT Online), Systems, Families, and Couples (PhD), School Counseling (Certificate)
- Psychology: Clinical Psychology (PhD, PsyD)
- Social Work and Social Ecology: Social Work (MSW Online or On-Campus, DSW Online)
- Division of Interdisciplinary Studies: Play Therapy (Certificate Online)
- Dual Degrees: Counseling/Marital and Family Therapy/Drug and Alcohol Counseling (MS/MS/Certificate Online), Social Work/Criminal Justice (MSW/MS)

== Rankings ==
Loma Linda University is not ranked in the 2022 version of the U.S. News & World Report Best Colleges Ranking, but its nursing program is tied for 76th. It was listed as the 994th best university in the world and the 213th best university in the United States by the Center for World University Rankings in their 2018–2019 rankings.

== Notable alumni ==
=== School of Medicine ===
Name	Class of	Notability	Ref.
Cynara L. Coomer, M.D.	1996	Chief of Breast Surgery and Director of the Comprehensive Breast Center at Staten Island University Hospital; Fox News medical contributor	SUNY Downstate Health Sciences Medical Center
T.R.M. Howard, M.D.	1935	Nationally known civil rights leader, entrepreneur, mentor to Medgar Evers, key figure in the investigation of the lynching of Emmett Till, president of the National Medical Association and chief surgeon of the Taborian Hospital of Mound Bayou, Mississippi	City Hospital, Number Two, in St. Louis, Missouri
Frank Jobe, M.D.	1956	World-renowned orthopedic surgeon; professor of orthopedics at the Keck School of Medicine of USC; orthopedic consultant for the Los Angeles Dodgers baseball team, PGA Tour & Senior PGA Tour, Los Angeles Lakers basketball team, Los Angeles Kings hockey team, and Los Angeles Angels of Anaheim baseball team	Orthopaedic Surgery, Los Angeles County Hospital in Los Angeles, California
Elisabeth Larsson	1931	Obstetrician/gynecologist and pioneering member of the Medical Women's International Association	

=== Other ===
Name	Class of	Notability	Ref.
Brian Brock	1996	Theologian of disability; graduated with an MA in Biomedical and Clinical Ethics	
Donna Franklin	19xx	Scholar, author and social scientist	
Edmund Jaeger	191x	Renowned naturalist and author; attended Loma Linda College of Medical Evangelists 1911–12 and 1912–13	
Heather Knight	1984	President of Pacific Union College	
William Matthew London	19xx	Professor of public health and consumer advocate	
David R. Williams	1981	Professor of Public Health at the Harvard School of Public Health, as well as a professor of African and African American Studies and of Sociology at Harvard University.	
Jerry Yang	1996	Poker player and winner of the 2007 World Series of Poker Main Event	

== See also ==
- Loma Linda University Church
- Loma Linda University Medical Center
- List of Seventh-day Adventist colleges and universities
