= Loma Linda, California =

City in California, United States

- City
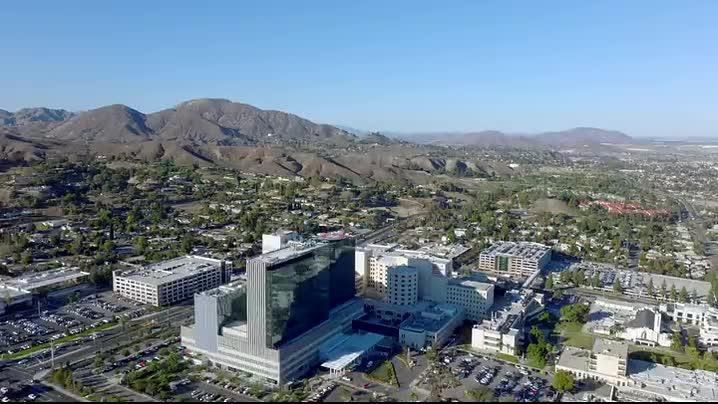
- A view of Loma Linda University Medical Center, with the city surrounding it

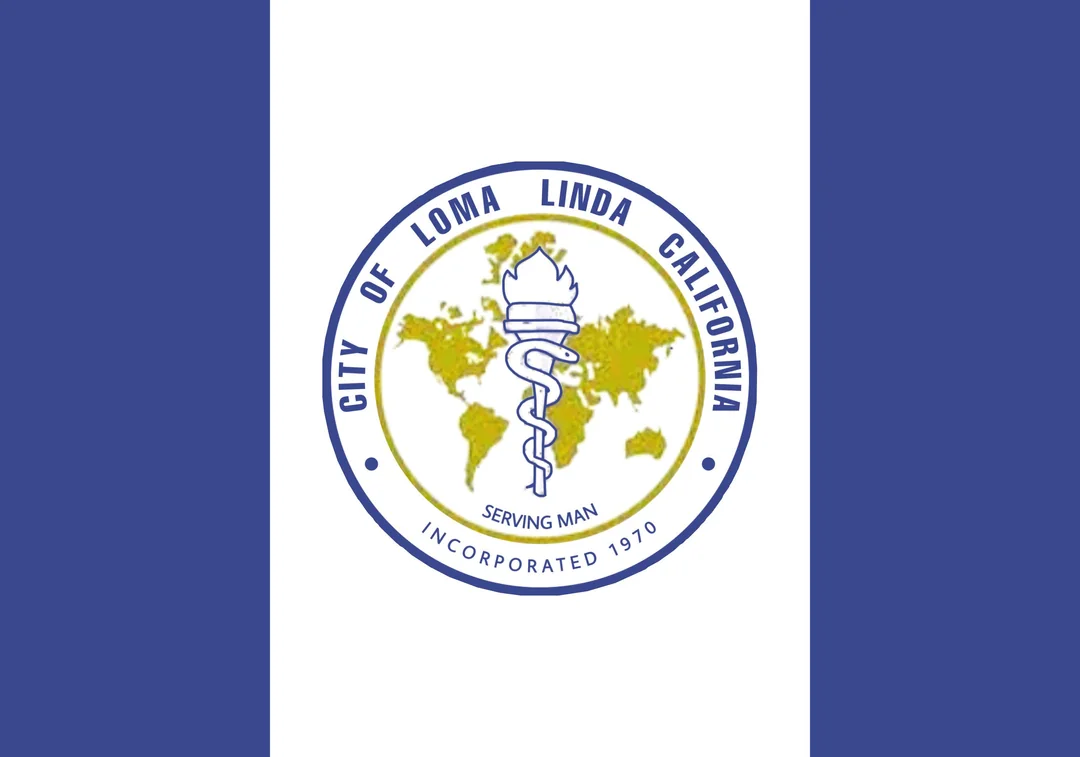
- Flag
- Motto: Serving Man
- Interactive map of Loma Linda, California
- Location in the United States
- Coordinates: 34°2′54″N 117°15′2″W
- Country: United States
- State: California
- County: San Bernardino
- Incorporated: September 29, 1970
- Named for: Spanish for "beautiful hill"

Government
  - Type: Council–manager
  - City council: Mayor Amy Jones; Mayor pro tempore: Rhonda Spencer; Councilmember: Rhodes Rigsby; Phill Dupper; Ovi Popescu

Area
  - Total: 7.64 sq mi (19.79 km^{2})
  - Land: 7.64 sq mi (19.79 km^{2})
  - Water: 0 sq mi (0.00 km^{2}) 0.01%
- Elevation: 1,165 ft (355 m)

Population (2020)
  - Total: 24,791
  - Density: 3,244/sq mi (1,253/km^{2})
- Time zone: UTC−8 (Pacific)
  - Summer (DST): UTC−7 (PDT)
- ZIP Codes: 92350, 92354, 92357
- Area code: 909
- FIPS code: 06-42370
- GNIS feature IDs: 1660935, 2410857
- Website: www.lomalinda-ca.gov

Loma Linda (Spanish for "Beautiful Hill") is a city in the Inland Empire region of San Bernardino County, California, United States, that was incorporated in 1970. The population was 24,791 at the 2020 census, up from 23,261 at the 2010 census. The central area of the city was originally known as Mound City, while its eastern half was originally the unincorporated community of Bryn Mawr.

== History ==
The Tongva village of Wa’aachnga, or as the Spanish referred to it as the Rancheria Guachama, was located at what is now Loma Linda. The rancheria was later occupied by the Cahuilla and Serrano after it was established as a mission outpost for Mission San Gabriel in the early 1800s.

In the late 1800s, Loma Linda began as a development of tourist halls called Mound City, as encouraged by railroad companies. Shops and cottages were built, but the project failed. During the late 1890s, a group of businessmen and physicians from Los Angeles bought the Mound City Hotel and reopened it as a convalescent home and health resort. They called it Loma Linda, meaning 'beautiful hill' in Spanish.

In 1905 Seventh-day Adventists John Burden and Ellen G. White purchased the Loma Linda Hotel and property and reopened it as the Loma Linda Sanitarium. In February 1906, The Loma Linda College of Evangelists (now Loma Linda University) was established.

In 1969, San Timoteo Creek overflowed its banks, inundating two-thirds of Loma Linda. Many of the bridges over the creek washed away, and Loma Linda Academy was completely flooded. In 2010, the creek again flooded parts of Loma Linda.

The city was incorporated in 1970.

== Geography ==
Loma Linda is located in southwestern San Bernardino County and is considered part of the Inland Empire. It is bordered on the north by the city of San Bernardino, on the east by Redlands, on the west by Colton, and on the south by Riverside County. An area of unincorporated territory in Riverside County separates Loma Linda from the city of Moreno Valley to the south. The remnants of Bryn Mawr, an unincorporated community formerly located between Loma Linda and Redlands, were annexed by the city in 2008.

Loma Linda is in the southern San Bernardino Valley. The southern third of the city is known as the South Hills; this rugged and hilly area at the northwestern end of the Badlands is a city-owned open space reserve protected by a local initiative. San Timoteo Creek flows from southeast to northwest through the city.

According to the United States Census Bureau, the city has a total area of 7.6 square miles (20 km^{2}), 99.99% of it land.

=== Water contamination ===
Ground water near Loma Linda is contaminated by a plume of the chemical perchlorate which was used in the manufacturing of solid rocket fuel. This chemical was also formerly (decades ago and in very small amounts) prescribed by physicians to control the overactive thyroid glands of certain patients. A nearby plant operated by Lockheed Aerospace has been implicated in the improper disposal of the rocket fuel ingredient, which leached into the ground water northeast of Loma Linda.

However, Loma Linda's municipal water supply has been unaffected by the plume, primarily because Lockheed Martin installed a $19 million treatment plant in 2010 to remove both perchlorate and trichloroethylene from water after pumping it from the aquifer.

== Demographics ==
Historical population
Census	Pop.	Note	%±
1970	9,797		—
1980	10,694		9.2%
1990	17,400		62.7%
2000	18,681		7.4%
2010	23,261		24.5%
2020	24,791		6.6%
U.S. Decennial Census

=== Racial and ethnic composition ===
Loma Linda city, California – Racial and ethnic composition Note: the US Census treats Hispanic/Latino as an ethnic category. This table excludes Latinos from the racial categories and assigns them to a separate category. Hispanics/Latinos may be of any race.
Race / Ethnicity (NH = Non-Hispanic)	Pop 2000	Pop 2010	Pop 2020	% 2000	% 2010	% 2020
White alone (NH)	8,799	8,600	7,175	47.10%	36.97%	28.94%
Black or African American alone (NH)	1,300	1,932	2,322	6.96%	8.31%	9.37%
Native American or Alaska Native alone (NH)	62	52	67	0.33%	0.22%	0.27%
Asian alone (NH)	4,536	6,509	6,865	24.28%	27.98%	27.69%
Native Hawaiian or Pacific Islander alone (NH)	33	139	70	0.18%	0.60%	0.28%
Other race alone (NH)	42	68	167	0.22%	0.29%	0.67%
Mixed race or Multiracial (NH)	859	790	1,217	4.60%	3.40%	4.91%
Hispanic or Latino (any race)	3,050	5,171	6,908	16.33%	22.23%	27.86%
Total	18,681	23,261	24,791	100.00%	100.00%	100.00%

=== 2020 census ===
As of the 2020 census, Loma Linda had a population of 24,791 and a population density of 3,244.9 inhabitants per square mile (1,252.9/km^{2}). The median age was 35.2 years. The age distribution was 19.9% under the age of 18, 9.1% aged 18 to 24, 32.8% aged 25 to 44, 21.2% aged 45 to 64, and 17.1% who were 65 years of age or older. For every 100 females, there were 88.6 males, and for every 100 females age 18 and over, there were 85.7 males age 18 and over.

The census reported that 97.8% of the population lived in households, 1.2% lived in non-institutionalized group quarters, and 1.0% were institutionalized. In addition, 99.5% of residents lived in urban areas, while 0.5% lived in rural areas.

There were 9,475 households, of which 29.9% had children under the age of 18 living in them. Of all households, 40.9% were married-couple households, 5.4% were cohabiting couple households, 19.3% were households with a male householder and no spouse or partner present, and 34.5% were households with a female householder and no spouse or partner present. About 27.7% of households were made up of individuals, and 10.9% had someone living alone who was 65 years of age or older. The average household size was 2.56. There were 6,047 families (63.8% of all households).

There were 10,082 housing units at an average density of 1,319.6 units per square mile (509.5 units/km^{2}), of which 9,475 (94.0%) were occupied and 6.0% were vacant. Of the occupied units, 34.7% were owner-occupied and 65.3% were occupied by renters. The homeowner vacancy rate was 1.2% and the rental vacancy rate was 4.1%.

Racial composition as of the 2020 census
Race	Number	Percent
White	8,626	34.8%
Black or African American	2,456	9.9%
American Indian and Alaska Native	222	0.9%
Asian	6,962	28.1%
Native Hawaiian and Other Pacific Islander	81	0.3%
Some other race	3,124	12.6%
Two or more races	3,320	13.4%

=== 2023 ACS 5-year estimates ===
In 2023, the US Census Bureau estimated that 29.3% of the population were foreign-born. Of all people aged 5 or older, 54.0% spoke only English at home, 18.6% spoke Spanish, 5.2% spoke other Indo-European languages, 16.3% spoke Asian or Pacific Islander languages, and 5.8% spoke other languages. Of those aged 25 or older, 90.5% were high school graduates and 51.9% had a bachelor's degree.

The median household income in 2023 was $82,824, and the per capita income was $43,108. About 7.0% of families and 11.6% of the population were below the poverty line.

=== 2010 census ===
At the 2010 Census, Loma Linda had a population of 23,261. The population density was 3,094.3 inhabitants per square mile (1,194.7/km^{2}). The racial makeup of Loma Linda was 47.8% White (11,122 people; 37.0% Non-Hispanic White); 8.7% African American (2,032 people); 0.4% Native American (97 people); 28.3% Asian (6,589 people); 0.7% Pacific Islander (154 people); 8.7% from other races (2,022 people); and 5.4% from two or more races (1,245 people). Hispanic or Latino of any race were 5,171 people (22.2%).

The census reported that 22,457 people (96.5% of the population) lived in households, 562 (2.4%) lived in non-institutionalized group quarters, and 242 (1.0%) were institutionalized.

There were 8,764 households, 2,650 (30.2%) had children under the age of 18 living in them, 3,832 (43.7%) were opposite-sex married couples living together, 1,190 (13.6%) had a female householder with no husband present, 461 (5.3%) had a male householder with no wife present. There were 351 (4.0%) unmarried opposite-sex partnerships, and 46 (0.5%) same-sex married couples or partnerships, while 2,453 households (28.0%) were one person and 837 (9.6%) had someone living alone who was 65 or older. The average household size was 2.56. There were 5,483 families (62.6% of households); the average family size was 3.18.

The age distribution was 4,859 people (20.9%) under the age of 18, 2,642 people (11.4%) aged 18 to 24, 7,463 people (32.1%) aged 25 to 44, 5,056 people (21.7%) aged 45 to 64, and 3,241 people (13.9%) who were 65 or older. The median age was 33.2 years. For every 100 females, there were 88.0 males. For every 100 females age 18 and over, there were 83.9 males.

There were 9,649 housing units at an average density of 1,283.6 per square mile, of the occupied units 3,432 (39.2%) were owner-occupied and 5,332 (60.8%) were rented. The homeowner vacancy rate was 2.5%; the rental vacancy rate was 9.9%. 9,496 people (40.8% of the population) lived in owner-occupied housing units and 12,961 people (55.7%) lived in rental housing units.

=== Longevity ===
Residents in Loma Linda have one of the highest rates of longevity in the United States. Writer Dan Buettner has labeled Loma Linda a Blue Zone, an area where the longevity is appreciably higher than the national average and a substantial proportion of the population lives past 100 years. Buettner's 2008 book, The Blue Zones: Lessons for Living Longer From the People Who've Lived the Longest, attributes Loma Linda's longevity rate to Adventist cultural health and diet practices. The city strictly controls the sale of alcohol and has banned public smoking. The church-owned grocery store does not sell meat.

== Government ==
Loma Linda uses the council-manager form of government, and the City Council is composed of Mayor Phill Dupper, Rhodes Rigsby, Ovidiu Popescu, Rhonda Spencer-Hwang, and pro tempore Ron Dailey.

Police services are provided by the San Bernardino County Sheriff's Office.

=== State and federal representation ===
In the California State Legislature, Loma Linda is in the 19th senatorial district, represented by Republican Rosilicie Ochoa Bogh, and in the 50th Assembly district, represented by Democrat Robert Garcia.

In the United States House of Representatives, Loma Linda is in California's 23rd congressional district, represented by Republican Jay Obernolte.

== Education ==
Most of the city of Loma Linda forms part of the Redlands Unified School District, with Bryn Mawr Elementary School being situated within Loma Linda city limits. However, the western edge of the city is served by the Colton Unified School District.

Also located in the city are Loma Linda Academy, a K–12 private school, and Loma Linda University (LLU), a health-sciences higher-learning institution, both run by the Seventh-day Adventist Church. Notable firsts at Loma Linda University's medical center include the first baboon-to-human heart transplant and the first split-brain surgery.

== Sister cities ==
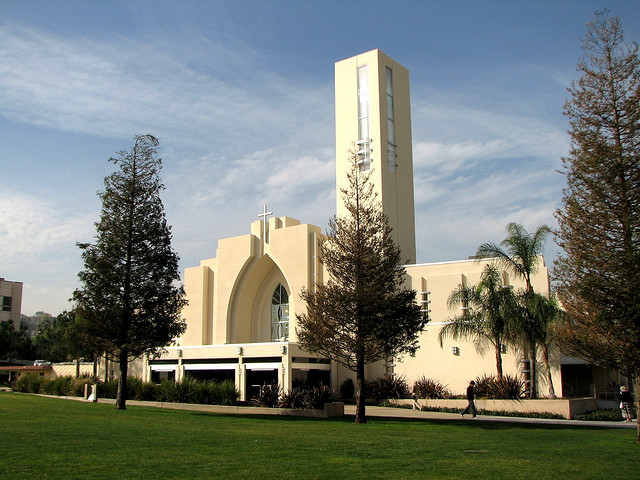
Loma Linda University Church of Seventh-day Adventists on the campus of Loma Linda University is home to the world's largest Adventist congregation.

Loma Linda is twinned with:

- Manipal, India
- Libertador San Martin, Argentina
- Puntarenas, Costa Rica

== Culture ==
=== In popular culture ===
Loma Linda University Medical Center is featured in Venom ER, an Animal Planet program focusing on snakebite treatment at the hospital. Former Loma Linda resident and heart surgeon Ellsworth Wareham was featured in the 2009 documentary film How to Live Forever.

=== Seventh-day Adventist influence ===
Seventh-day Adventist institutions in the city include Loma Linda University, Loma Linda University Medical Center, the Loma Linda University Church, and the Loma Linda Academy. Nearly half of the city's residents are members of the Seventh-day Adventist Church, a Protestant denomination founded in 1863 that observes Sabbath from sundown on Friday to sundown on Saturday. In 1904, Seventh-day Adventist church guided by the visions of prophet Ellen G. White purchased a failed resort in the city to create a sanitarium and nursing school. In 1909, the church opened a school of medicine that eventually became Loma Linda University Medical Center.

=== Blue Zone ===
In 2004, researcher Dan Buettner, National Geographic, the National Institute on Aging, and other researchers named Loma Linda one of five Blue Zones in the world. Blue zones are areas where residents live longer than average and this is attributed to the healthy lifestyle of the many Adventist residents in Loma Linda.

=== Cuisine ===
Loma Linda cuisine is heavily vegetarian. In 1905, the all-vegetarian Loma Linda Foods company was founded in Loma Linda. The Loma Linda Market grocery store does not sell any red meat, poultry, or seafood. The Loma Linda University dining halls serve exclusively vegetarian meals. The cafeteria in the Loma Linda Medical Center serves only plant-based meals. The hospital's patient menu serves some meat choices. Because many members of the Adventist faith are vegetarians, there are many vegetarian restaurants in the downtown area and many vegetarian options in the non-vegetarian restaurants. Adventist church potlucks are all-vegetarian and happen regularly. Alcohol and coffee are avoided by many residents of Loma Linda.

== Notable people ==
- Brandon Beresford – soccer player
- Miles Byass – soccer player
- Ted Chronopoulos – soccer player and coach
- Baby Fae – first infant xenotransplant subject
- Brent Mayne – baseball player; former catcher for the Kansas City Royals and San Francisco Giants
- Matthew Modine – actor
- Loree Sutton – retired United States Army general; candidate in the 2021 New York City Democratic mayoral primary
- Don Vesco – motorcycle racer; inductee in the Motorsports Hall of Fame of America
- Ellsworth Wareham – centenarian; surgeon; World War II veteran
