= Emiko Omori =

American cinematographer and film director

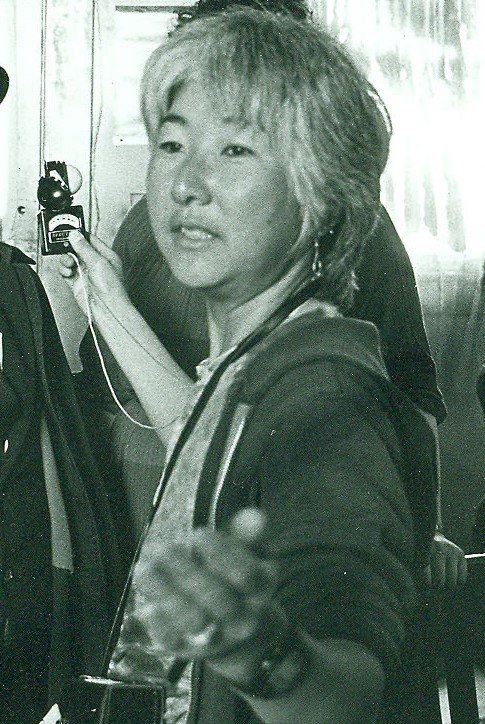
- Omori in 1983
- Born: 1940 (age 85–86); California, USA
- Occupations: Cinematographer; Film director
- Known for: Documentary films

Emiko Omori (Japanese: 大森 恵美子, born 1940) is an American cinematographer and film director known for her documentary films. Her feature-length documentary Rabbit in the Moon won the Best Documentary Cinematography Award at the 1999 Sundance Film Festival and an Emmy Award after it was broadcast on PBS that same year. One of the first camerawomen to work in news documentaries, Omori began her career at KQED in San Francisco in 1968.

== Life and career ==
The youngest of three sisters, Omori was born in California to parents of Japanese descent. In 1942, the family was uprooted from their small but prosperous vegetable farm in Oceanside, California and taken to the Poston internment camp in Arizona where Americans of Japanese ancestry were incarcerated after the attack on Pearl Harbor and signing of Executive Order 9066. The family was released in 1945, shortly before her fifth birthday and returned to Oceanside. Her mother died a year later. Omori later said of her childhood and young adult years:

I totally rejected everything Japanese and didn't want to have anything to do with it. Of course, the internment camps didn't help. The Japanese language was violently and adamantly suppressed, and we were 'discouraged from congregating'. So, for a long time. I wanted to be the total opposite.

Omori studied film at San Francisco State University, graduating in 1967. She began her career in 1968 at KQED in San Francisco working on the station's newly launched program Newsroom and became one of the first camerawomen to work in news documentaries. She started off as an editor but after two weeks began filming for the show. A year later she organized the San Francisco branch of the National Association of Broadcast Employees and Technicians. She became a freelance cinematographer in the 1970s and worked on several documentaries on aspects of African-American culture.

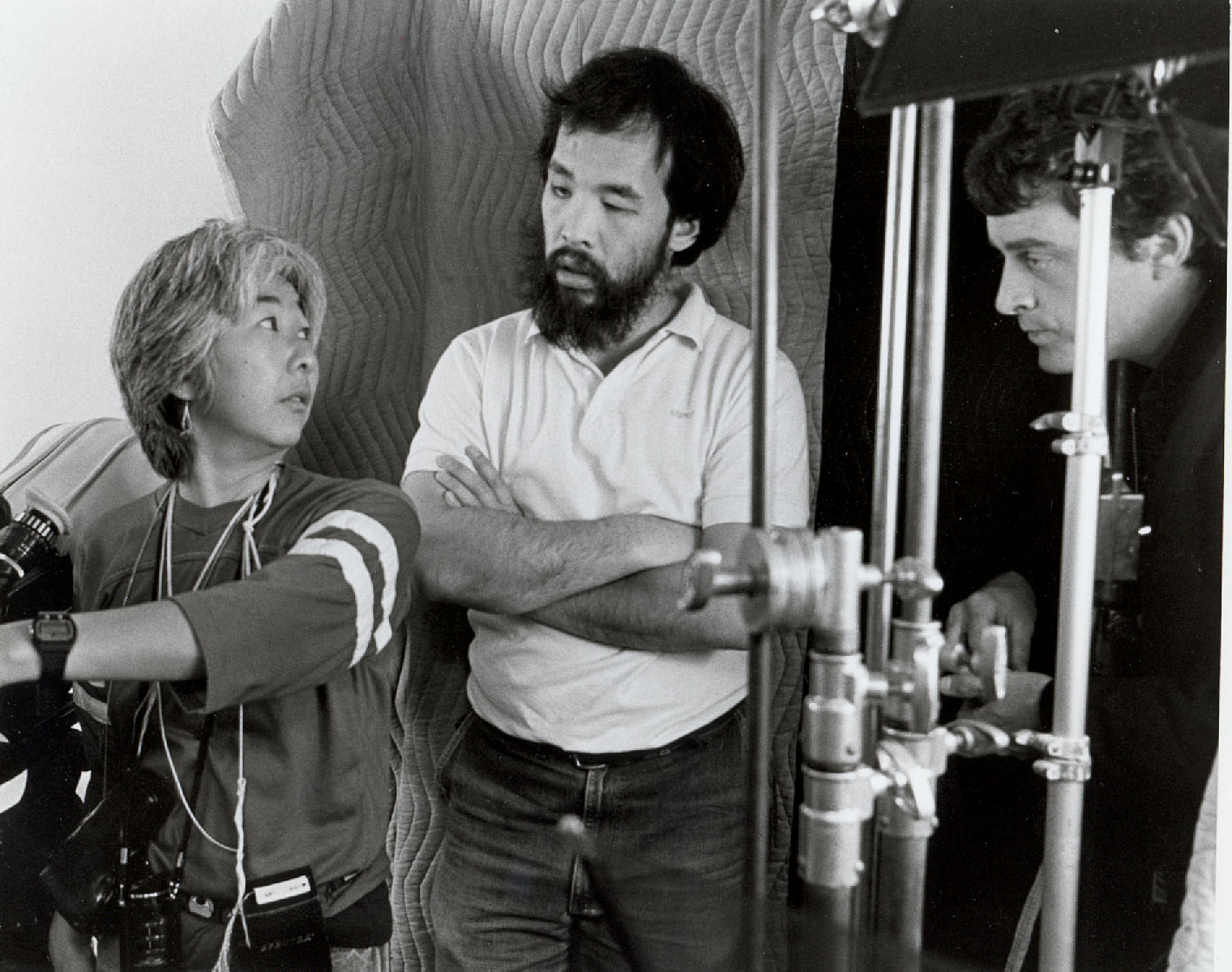
Omori (left) filming on the set of Dim Sum: A Little Bit of Heart, 1983

Omori first met tattoo artist Ed Hardy in 1974 when she visited Tattoo City, his original San Francisco studio, and received a small tattoo. It was the beginning of a collaboration that has lasted for over 30 years, spurred her own interest in tattoo art, and led to an awakening of her interest in her Japanese heritage. She began filming Hardy at work over the next several years. The resulting half-hour documentary, Tattoo City, premiered at the Castro Theatre in 1980. Part of the film depicted Hardy's creation on Omori's back of a traditional Japanese tattoo based on the fable of the pearl diver Princess Tamatori. In 2010 she directed, filmed, and narrated the feature-length documentary, Ed Hardy: Tattoo the World, a retrospective of Hardy's life and work. She also co-produced and wrote the 2002 PBS television documentary Skin Stories which explored the cultural significance of tattooing in Hawaii, New Zealand, Samoa, San Diego and Los Angeles.

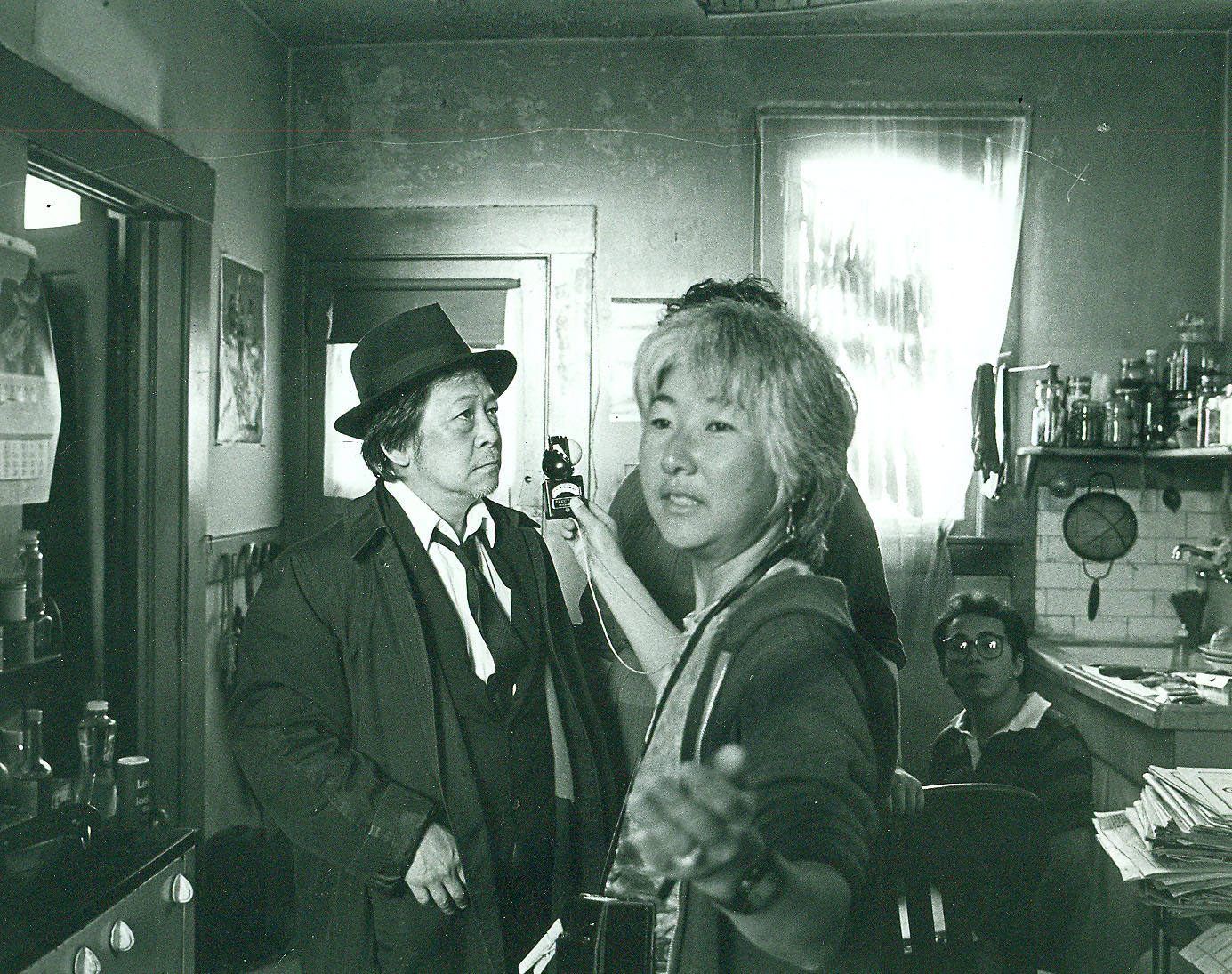
Omori takes a light reading off Victor Wong's face on the set of Wayne Wang's 1983 film Dim Sum: A Little Bit of Heart set in San Francisco, California.

The 1980s saw the first two of Omori's three cinematic explorations of the lives of Japanese Americans. They also marked her rare foray into fictional film. The Departure, a short film about a young Japanese-American girl growing up in California's Central Valley in the 1930s was made in 1983 and broadcast on the PBS Asian American anthology series Silk Screen in 1985. The one-hour film, Hot Summer Winds, which Omori both wrote and directed, was based on two short stories by Hisaye Yamamoto and was the first time any of Yamamoto's work had been adapted for the screen. It aired on American Playhouse in 1991. In the early 1990s, Omori began a seven-year project on the effects of the World War II internment of the Japanese American community. The resulting feature-length documentary, Rabbit in the Moon, was written, directed, filmed, and narrated by Omori. It was co-produced with her elder sister Chizuko, a Seattle writer who had been involved in the campaign to pass the Civil Liberties Act of 1988 which finally granted reparations to Japanese Americans for their internment. Rabbit in the Moon won the Best Documentary Cinematography Award at the 1999 Sundance Film Festival and an Emmy Award for Outstanding Historical Programming after it was broadcast on PBS that same year.

Omori's later work includes the documentaries Passion & Power: The Technology of Orgasm and To Chris Marker, An Unsent Letter. Released in 2008 and co-written and directed with Wendy Slick, Passion & Power is based on an academic book by Rachel Maines on the history of the vibrator. To Chris Marker, An Unsent Letter, released in 2014, is a film essay on the life and work of the enigmatic French filmmaker Chris Marker who died in 2012. Omori had worked as one of the cinematographers on Marker's documentary series, The Owl's Legacy in 1989 and was a great admirer of his work which she said had opened her mind "to other ways of seeing and relating." Omori also appears in Alexis Krasilovsky's 2007 documentary Women behind the Camera.

== Filmography ==
Omori's films from 1975 to the present include the following.

=== 1970s and 80s ===
- 1975 Were You There When the Animals Talked? (cinematographer). Documentary on African-American folklore directed by Robert N. Zagone.
- 1979 The Black West (cinematographer). Documentary on African-Americans' role the colonization of the American West directed by Robert N. Zagone.
- 1979 Bones (cinematographer). Documentary on musicians John Henry "Bones" Nobles and Taj Mahal directed by Carol Munday Lawrence.
- 1980 The Life and Times of Rosie the Riveter (camerawoman).
- 1980 Tattoo City (director, cinematographer). Documentary on Ed Hardy.
- 1983 The Departure (1983) (director, cinematographer). Drama centered on a Japanese American girl growing up in 1930s California.
- 1983 Fall of the I-Hotel (cinematographer). Documentary on the demise of San Francisco's International Hotel directed by Curtis Choy.
- 1984 The Times of Harvey Milk (camerawoman).
- 1985 Dim Sum: A Little Bit of Heart (camerawoman).
- 1988 La Ofrenda: the Days of the Dead (cinematographer). Documentary on Mexico's Day of the Dead directed by Lourdes Portillo

=== 1990s ===
- 1991 Hot Summer Winds (writer, director). Drama based on two short stories by Hisaye Yamamoto.
- 1998 Regret to Inform (cinematographer, Vietnam sequences).
- 1999 Corpus: A Home Movie About Selena (cinematographer).
- 1999 Rabbit in the Moon (director, writer, cinematographer, narrator, co-producer). Documentary on the World War II internment of Japanese Americans.

=== 2000 – present ===
- 2000 Rebels with a Cause (cinematographer). Documentary on the Students for a Democratic Society directed by Helen Garvey.
- 2002 Skin Stories (co-producer, writer). Television documentary exploring the cultural significance of tattooing in Polynesia and the California coast.
- 2008 Passion & Power: The Technology of Orgasm (co-producer, co-writer, cinematographer). Documentary on the history and social implications of the vibrator.
- 2010 Ed Hardy: Tattoo the World (director, cinematographer, narrator). Documentary on Ed Hardy's life and work.
- 2014 To Chris Marker, An Unsent Letter (writer, director, cinematographer). Documentary film essay Chris Marker
- 2015 Chinese Couplets (cinematographer). Documentary on four generations of Chinese American women directed by Felicia Lowe.
