= Bob Sarlatte =

American actor

- Born: United States
- Occupations: Actor, comedian, sports announcer
- Years active: 1986–present
- Website: www.bobsarlatte.com

Bob Sarlatte is an American actor, comedian and sports announcer known for such films and television series as Star Trek IV: The Voyage Home, EDtv, and David Letterman's various late-night shows.

Sarlatte was also the on-field stadium announcer for 30 years for the San Francisco 49ers football team.

== Butch Whacks & The Glass Packs ==
Butch Whacks & The Glass Packs began while Sarlatte was at the University of California, Berkeley while Julio Lopez and the others were at the nearby Saint Mary's College of California.

Peter Gordon replaced Karl Young, when Young switched from studying music to studying physics at San Francisco State.

Sarlatte said Butch Whacks threw in the towel after playing a predominantly black club in Atlanta. “We did our ”white boy nostalgia act” to disastrous results,” Sarlatte recalled. “We had a great agent,” he lamented.

== Filmography ==
=== Films ===
Year	Film	Role	Director	Notes
1981	Street Scene	Voice	Andy Aaron	Short film
1986	Star Trek IV: The Voyage Home	Waiter	Leonard Nimoy	
1993	So I Married an Axe Murderer	M.C.	Thomas Schlamme	
1997	Flubber	Rutland Coach	Les Mayfield	
1999	EDtv	Motorcycle Cop	Ron Howard	
2006	Read You Like a Book		Robert N. Zagone	
2014	Hey Monster, Hands Off My City	Parking Control Officer Gallegos	Michael Meehan	

=== Television ===
==== Live-action roles ====
Year(s)	Title	Role(s)	Notes
1980	The David Letterman Show	Self	S1E3
1983–1991	Late Night with David Letterman	Self	14 episodes
1984	Partners in Crime	Stage Manager	S1E1 "Celebrity"
1985	Brothers	Football Announcer #1	S2E10 "A House Divided"
1987	Entertainment Tonight	Self	October 5, 1987 episode
1989–1990	Night Court	Nick Costanza; Ed Druthers	S6E21 "Not My Type"; S7E23 "A Closer Look"
1990–1991	Match Game	Self (panelist)	10 episodes
1994	Web of Deception	Tom Bannister	TV movie
1996	Night Stand with Dick Dietrick	Rusty "Hellcat" Robinson	S1E33 "Dream a Little Dream". Credited as Robert Sarlatt (sic)
1999–2013	Late Show with David Letterman	Self	15 episodes
2002	Ed	Nick Bogaty	S3E2 "Miss Stuckeyville"

==== Voice roles ====
Year(s)	Title	Role(s)	Notes
1981	The Kwicky Koala Show	Various voices	
1981	Trollkins	Various voices	13 episodes
1982	The Smurfs	Voice	S2E1 "The Smurf Who Couldn't Say No"
1983	Saturday Supercade	Frogger	3 episodes
1984	Dragon's Lair	Dirk the Daring	Main role; 13 episodes
1984	The New Scooby-Doo Mysteries	Voice	S2E1 "Happy Birthday, Scooby-Doo"
1986	Star Wars: Ewoks	Various voices	13 episodes

=== Video games ===
Year	Title	Role	Notes
1993	Police Quest: Open Season	Narrator (voice)	
1995	How to Be Perfect with Bob Goldthwait	Host (voice)	
2006	CSI: 3 Dimensions of Murder	Various voices	
2010	Dead Space: Ignition	Various voices	
