= Cham Americans =

The Cham people are a predominantly Muslim ethnic minority from the ancient Champa Kingdom in central Vietnam who have historically faced persecution and genocide by the Khmer Rouge in the 1970's. The largest population of the Cham diaspora outside of Asia reside in Southern California, USA.

== Santa Ana ==
Ahmath El's family was the first Cham refugee family to arrive in Santa Ana in 1979. With the support of a Christian aid organization, following their time in a refugee camp in Thailand, El's family established new roots. El facilitated the relocation of multiple Cham families, contributing to a gradual increase in the Cham population in Orange County. In 1990 there were approximately 132 Cham refugee families residing in Orange County. As the community grew it established the Indo-Chinese Muslim Refugee Association, which 35 years later, led to the formation of the Islamic Center of Santa Ana, the first mosque established by the Cham Muslim community.

== Islamic Center of Santa Ana and "Taco Trucks at Every Mosque" ==
The Islamic Center of Santa Ana was the site where the Taco Trucks at Every Mosque initiative originated, later expanding to a national level. Founded by Rida Hamida and Benjamin Vasquez, the initiative involved serving tacos at mosques as a way to encourage community engagement and solidarity between ethnic groups amid heightened national debates on immigration. The effort also brought increased public attention to the local Cham community and its distinct cultural identity.

== Pomona ==
Established in 1998, Masjid Sabireen started when 12 Cham families from Orange County moved to Pomona. Today the mosque serves the community with food drives, prayer services and other community events.

== Identity ==
The Cham community has worked to maintain its cultural identity. Some families have adopted the surname “Cham” as a way to affirm this identity. Within broader Cambodian, Vietnamese, and Laotian immigrant communities, the Cham population is relatively small and receives less recognition than other sub-groups.

== See also ==
- Cham people
