= Taco Trucks at Every Mosque =

Community initiative in California

Taco Trucks at Every Mosque (also #TacoTrucksAtEveryMosque) is a community initiative started in Orange County, California that aims to bring together Muslim and Latino communities through sharing food. The events were the idea of Rida Hamida and Ben Vazquez. The first event took place on June 3, 2017 and have taken place throughout California, in Mexico and Milwaukee.

== History ==
While Latinos currently make up around a third of Orange County's residents and there are 120,000 Muslims, both minority groups do not have much political power. In 2016, both groups of people saw an increase in documented hate crimes against their communities. Also in 2016, Marco Gutierrez of the Latinos for Trump group, said, "You're going to have taco trucks on every corner." When Donald Trump won the presidency, there was an increase in the amount of both anti-immigrant and anti-Muslim feelings in American culture. After Trump won, Rida Hamida, a Muslim from Anaheim, and Benjamin Vazquez, who is a Latino from Santa Ana, met and began a discussion about what Muslims and Latinos could learn from one another. Hamida and Vasquez thought about the taco truck idea and about bringing Muslims to Mexican restaurants. In the end, they decided to bring taco trucks to mosques. Using the taco trucks (or loncheras) was also a way to empower Latinos. Taco Trucks at Every Mosque is also a way for the two minority communities to get to know one another and combat the fear of immigrant communities.

The first event, an iftar, took place on June 3, 2017 at the Islamic Center of Santa Ana and was attended by 600 people. The halal tacos were given free to people attending the iftar. The second event, a few weeks later at the Islamic Society of Orange County, was attended by 1,400 people. The groups raise money to pay for the tacos and in 2017, visited every mosque in Orange County during Ramadan. Because Ramadan is also a time of charity, the taco truck plan was a good fit. Even though the events focus on the Latino and Muslim communities, everyone is welcome. One person attending the second event hoped that Taco Trucks at Every Mosque would inspire more Muslims to come to Latino events. Hamida and Vazquez promoted the events on Twitter with the hashtag, #TacoTrucksAtEveryMosque.

== Legacy ==
The Taco Trucks at Every Mosque events have taken place in communities from Baja California in Mexico to Sacramento. They have also taken place during Eid al-Adha. The events have inspired a mosque in Milwaukee, the Islamic Society of Milwaukee, to copy the idea. Marco Gutierrez posted a video on his Instagram, saying "I tried to warn you people. #TacoTrucksOnEveryCorning [sic] has mutated into #TacoTrucksatEveryMosque!"

== See also ==
- Taco trucks on every corner
