= Carne Cruda =

American post-Latin band

Carne Cruda is a post-Latin band based in Oakland, California. The band consists of five core members and incorporates frequent guest appearances, and also frequently backs up other artists.

== Band history ==
Camilo Landau and Charlie Gurke met while attending high school at San Francisco School of the Arts, where they formed a band called The Ska Messengers. In the year 2000, while attending college at UCSC, guitarist and tres player Camilo Landau decided to form a band to experiment with blending Latin music and Caribbean music with other musical genres. While playing in the UCSC Jazz ensembles under the direction of Ray Brown and Smith Dobson, he met drummer E. Dillon Westbrook and asked him if he wanted to start a group. They teamed up with conga player Jeremy Fisher and began experimenting and practicing. They added Charlie Gurke to the group and began playing around local venues in Santa Cruz, California.

In 2001 Landau and Gurke went to [Cuba] for three months to study music. There they wrote arrangements for what they envisioned as a new direction for the band. When they returned they added Luke Kirley on trombone and Matthew Val Hall on trumpet to the band and began playing again. They were featured in Metro Santa Cruz's column "New Band Alert" where they were described as "the Latin Squirrel Nut Zippers."

In 2004 the band moved to [Oakland, California] where they re-formed, adding bassist Ayla Davila who had recently graduated from the prestigious [Berklee College of Music] and drummer David M. Flores. With this new configuration they recorded their first full-length album "Spicy Sea Adventures" in 2005. The album was picked up by Belgium's Surf-Cumbia Rockerds label and the band began their first European tour, playing concerts in Belgium, Switzerland, Austria, Germany, and Poland. They subsequently went on three more European tours and added Denmark, Slovenia, Croatia, Bosnia, Serbia, and Macedonia.

In 2009 Carne Cruda began a new collaboration with Brazilian singer and dancer Dandara Backen. They formed a new group called De Bahia a Bahia, which means "from one bay to another" since Dandara is from Bahia, Brazil and Carne Cruda is from the Bay Area.

In 2010 Carne Cruda won Oakland Magazine's "Best Oakland Theme Song" award in an article titled "Oakland's Tight, Hella Tight!"

In 2010 Carne Cruda release a new album on Round Whirled Records called "Oakland's Tight" produced by veteran record producer Greg Landau and recorded, mixed, and mastered by engineer John Greenham.

In 2016 the band released the song I Love You More Than Tacos. The song is about "a man's love so profound that he would give his Tacos and Burritos to someone else". Univision reported that the song "has become something of an anthem in the wake of the #TacoTruckOnEveryCorner controversy."

== Band members ==
=== Current members ===
- Camilo Landau – guitar, tres, vocals
- David M. Flores – drumset, timbales, percussion
- Ayla Davila – electric bass, electric upright bass
- Luke Kirley – trombone
- Charlie Gurke – baritone saxophone

=== Past members ===
- E. Dillon Westbrook – drumset
- Jeremy Fisher – congas
- Adam Charp – bass
- Matthew Val Hall – trumpet
- Ezra Gale – bass
- Ethan Sanchez – bass
- Nick Fishman – drumset

=== Other Musicians who have recorded with Carne Cruda ===
- Edgardo Cambón
- Kevin Kmetz
- Paul Van Wageningen
- Andy Mendoza
- Marco Diaz
- Omar Sosa
- Marta Gonzalez
- Gabriel Tenorio
- Gabriel Gonzalez
- Orlando Torriente
- Rafael Herrera
- Bryan Dyer
- Michelle Jacques
- Dahnda Da Hora
- Dandara Backen
- Carlos Caro
- Colin Hogan
- Javier Navarrette
- Greg Landau

== Notable performances ==
- Belgrade Beer Fest
- Yerba Buena Gardens Festival
- Encuentro del Canto Popular
- Carnaval San Diego (De Bahia a Bahia) https://web.archive.org/web/20141217052457/http://greencapproductions.com/
- Oakland's Tight Night – Parkway Theater
- Friday Night Live in Cloverdale, California
- Niska Banja Festivalu Vina
