= Back from Nicaragua =

Back from Nicaragua is a 1984 documentary film directed by filmmaker Julio Emilio Moliné. produced by Nina Serrano and Valerie Landau. It features interviews and performances with Joan Baez, Holly Near, Pete Seeger, The Looters and Sebastopol, California Reverend Don Chase about their visits to Nicaragua. Julio Emilio Moliné also directed the 1981 film Joan Baez in Latin America: There but for fortune.
