= Taco trucks on every corner =

Quote by American activist Marco Gutierrez

External media

Audio
- "Taco Trucks". BBC World Service. 2016-09-10.

Video
- "Follow The Hashtag: #TacoTrucksOnEveryCorner". Deutsche Welle. 2016-09-10.
- This Week in WTF: Latinos for Trump on YouTube, 2016-09-12, Full Frontal with Samantha Bee

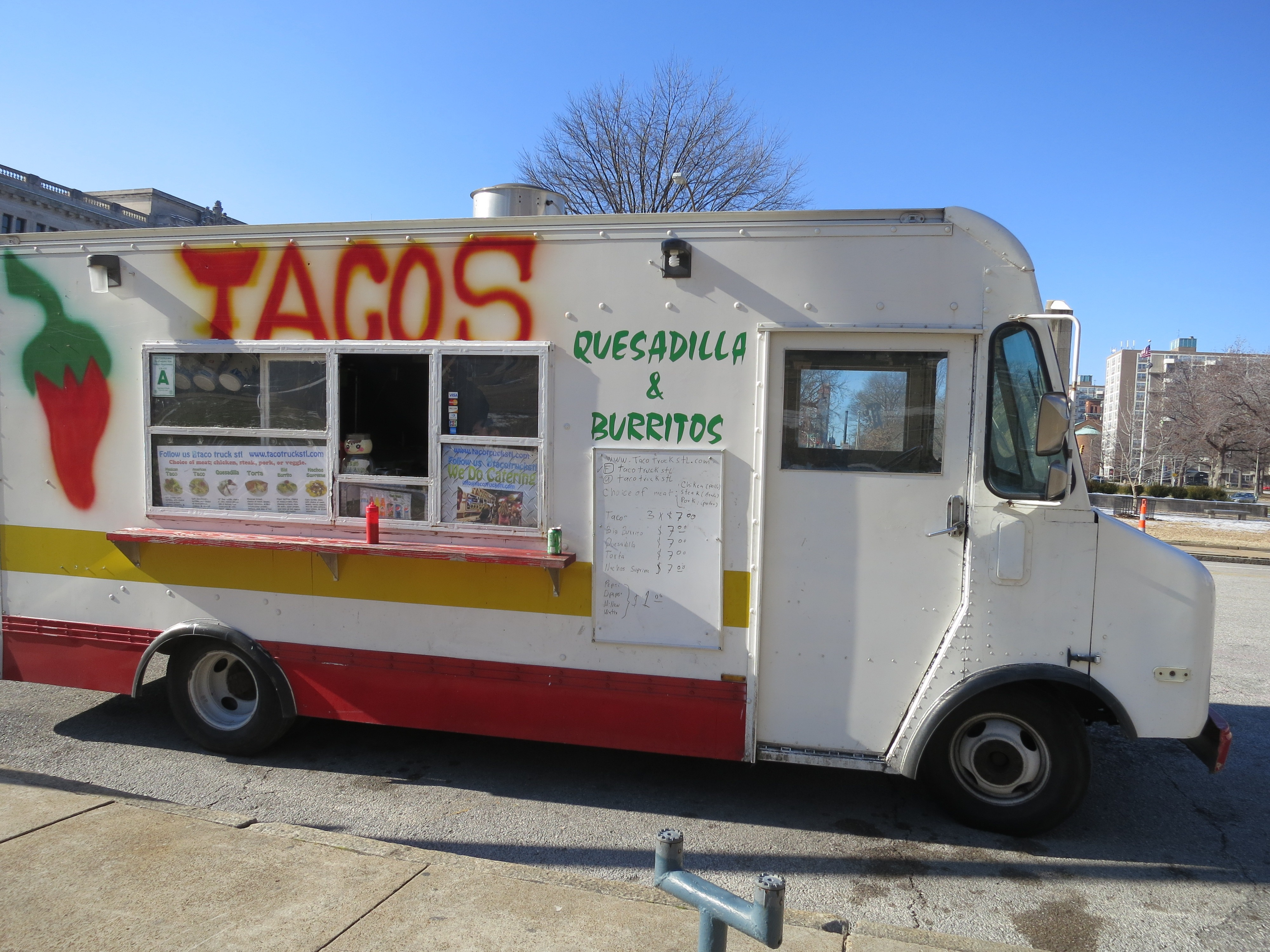
A taco truck in the downtown area of St. Louis, Missouri

The phrase "taco trucks on every corner" was used by American activist Marco Gutierrez, the co-founder of Latinos for Trump, on September 1, 2016, which received widespread attention during that year's presidential election. During an interview with MSNBC, Gutierrez referred to emigration from Mexico, stating that "My culture is a very dominant culture, and it's imposing and it's causing problems. If you don't do something about it, you're going to have taco trucks on every corner."

His remarks subsequently met with both sarcasm and criticism, many mocking the statement on social media and sending #TacosOnEveryCorner to the top of Twitter's list of trending topics. Others expressed concern over his remarks, stating that he was using "coded language that politicians and pundits use to get away with explicitly racist messages—from crime to immigration and terrorism." Taco trucks were used as voter registration-information booths in Houston, Texas, and a nationwide Guac the Vote campaign was launched. NPR wrote that taco trucks "now straddle the worlds of political symbol and internet meme".

== Origin ==
The phrase originated with Hispanic American activist Marco Gutierrez, a co-founder of the group Latinos for Trump, during an interview with MSNBC host Joy Reid on September 1, 2016 regarding the 2016 Donald Trump presidential campaign. The phrase was used within the context of a warning about the "dominance" of Mexican culture, underscoring Gutierrez's stance that emigration from Mexico should be more closely regulated. (Note: "While on All in With Chris Hayes on Thursday evening, Latinos for Trump founder Marco Gutierrez warned of the danger of allowing Mexican culture to enter the United States unabated.") In an interview with Deutsche Welle on September 8, 2016, Gutierrez explained, "If you don't regulate the immigration, if you don't structure our communities, we are going to do whatever we want. We are going to take over. That is what I'm trying to say and I think what is happening with my culture is that its imposing [itself] on the American culture—and both cultures are reacting."

== Reactions ==
- Online responses followed immediately after the interview. The Associated Press described the online response as a "social media onslaught". On September 3, 2016, #TacoTrucksOnEveryCorner was the top hashtag on Twitter.
- A taco truck voter registration drive in Houston drove a dramatic increase in the city's voter registration. Houston Chronicle reported that the effort "...is a trend that prompted Harris County Clerk Stan Stanart to call a news conference Wednesday, just a few blocks from the Tacos Tierra Caliente truck, to encourage people to vote early and avoid the crowds." Houston Chronicle later reported that "As registration closed, Harris County's voter roster had grown by more than 6 percent since 2014, the steepest increase in 16 years. More than 323,890 new names have been added." The initiative was widely covered in local, national, and international news media.
- The United States Hispanic Chamber of Commerce started a Guac the Vote campaign to use taco trucks to register voters and to appear at polling stations on election day. The campaign name is a reference to guacamole. (Note: "On Tuesday, the Hispanic Chamber, which says it represents 4.1 million Hispanic-owned businesses nationwide, took things a step further, announcing a "Guac the Vote" campaign to encourage taco truck owners to register customers to vote and then to park outside polling sites on Election Day in a symbolic, if tasty, protest of Gutierrez's comments.")
- Gustavo Arellano et al. started the satirical political Taco Truck Party. LA Weekly quoted Arellano as stating "It is perfect that the election has been boiled down to this one essential binary—do you want tacos or no tacos".
- Several owners of taco trucks used the opportunity to criticize and protest Trump. Nancy Paz, owner of Detroit taco truck Tacos El Caballo, parked her truck across the street from a Trump rally two days after the remarks. Meanwhile, Osiris Hoil, owner of Washington-area Mexican restaurant District Taco, welcomed the idea of taco trucks on every corner, responding with a simple "Why not?" Hoil founded District Taco as a food truck in Rosslyn, Virginia before eventually opening up several brick-and-mortar restaurants in the Washington area.

=== By political figures ===
- During a conference call with university students on September 8, 2016, Hillary Clinton stated "And in case you're wondering, I'd love it if there were taco trucks on every corner!"
- During a visit to Los Angeles on September 9, 2016, former president of Mexico Vicente Fox visited a taco truck while being interviewed for the radio show El Show de Piolín and stated "Los tacos will make America great—not the other guy".
- On September 13, 2016, advocacy news website Vox quoted Donald Trump campaign spokesperson Jon Cordova as saying "Marco Gutierrez is NOT a surrogate for the Donald Trump campaign and only represents his own views, not the position of the campaign."
- On September 15, 2016, at the Congressional Hispanic Caucus Institute, Hillary Clinton stated "By the way, I personally think a taco truck on every corner sounds absolutely delicious" as part of her speech there.

=== By location ===
- The Colorado Democratic Party used a taco truck parked outside of campaign headquarters of Donald Trump in Denver to register voters. On September 7, 2016 the truck was vandalized.
- In Detroit, the Hillary Clinton campaign announced a Voter Registration on Every Corner- Southwest Taco Trucks Edition event involving eight taco trucks for September 16, 2016.
- In Houston, communications firm Rigsby Hull and Mi Familia Vota organized a two-week voter registration drive, enlisting taco trucks citywide as distribution centers for voter registration cards and bilingual voter information guides. The drive started September 27, 2016: National Voter Registration Day and ran through October 11, 2016.
- Taco trucks were used in political events in Arizona and Detroit.

=== In popular culture ===
- Sales of the song "I Love You More Than Tacos" by the Latin music band Carne Cruda increased. The song is about "a man's love so profound that he would give his tacos and burritos to someone else". Univision reported that the song "has become something of an anthem in the wake of the #TacoTruckOnEveryCorner controversy."
- On October 21, 2016, American singer and musical theatre actress Leslie Kritzer released a satirical song titled "Taco Truck Invasion". Entertainment Weekly wrote that "Kritzer battles the derogatory statement made by Gutierrez, who also founded Latinos for Trump, with humor by embodying her alter-ego Riff-Tina, dancing through the streets with a taco truck by her side."

== Polling ==
In a survey of 1,898 American adults conducted on September 3, 2016, market research firm YouGov reported that 58% would be happy "if there was a taco truck on your corner".

In an opinion poll of 744 likely voters conducted in Florida from September 4 to 6, 2016, polling firm Public Policy Polling reported that "tacos and taco trucks are pretty popular among voters who have opinions on them." The firm reported tacos had a +36% net favorability, and taco trucks had a +30% net favorability, with a "pretty significant party divide on the 'issue' of taco trucks".

== See also ==
- List of political slogans
- List of U.S. presidential campaign slogans
- Taco Trucks At Every Mosque
