= The Devil Never Sleeps (film) =

- Theatrical release poster
- Spanish: El diablo nunca duerme
- Directed by: Lourdes Portillo
- Written by: Lourdes Portillo
- Produced by: Lourdes Portillo; Michelle Valladares
- Narrated by: Lourdes Portillo
- Cinematography: Kyle Kibbe
- Edited by: Vivien Hillgrove
- Music by: Mark Adler; Lola Beltrán
- Distributed by: Women Make Movies
- Release date: 1994
- Running time: 84 minutes
- Countries: Mexico, United States
- Languages: English, Spanish

The Devil Never Sleeps (Spanish: El diablo nunca duerme) is a 1994 Mexican-American documentary film directed by Lourdes Portillo and produced by Portillo and Michelle Valladares.

In 2020, the film was selected for preservation in the United States National Film Registry by the Library of Congress as being "culturally, historically, or aesthetically significant".

== Plot ==
Filmmaker Lourdes Portillo receives a call that her uncle Oscar had died. Initially, the cause of death was claimed to have been a heart attack or homicide. However, the police later ruled his death as a suicide. Portillo goes to her hometown of Chihuahua, Mexico to investigate how her uncle died. She interviews family members, friends, community members, and acquaintances of Oscar and discovers new details about her uncle that she had never heard before.

The police report of Oscar's death states that he was found dead at the sports facility with a gunshot to the back of the head and a pistol in his hand. Despite the police ruling his death as a suicide, his family questions the cause of death due to Oscar's perceived successful status as a rancher, produce exporter, politician, widow, and husband. Portillo investigates Oscar's life to determine if he or anyone in his life has a motive for his death. As a result, Portillo discovers many unknown aspects about her family and Oscar about his remarriage, life insurance policy, business complications, a possible cancer and AIDS diagnosis, and a potential homosexual relationship.

Many of the details and theories surrounding Oscar's life are told by aunts, friends, colleagues, and business partners in interviews with Portillo where she allows them to express their details about Oscar freely. One significant interview is with Ofelia, Oscar’s second wife. Ofelia is never filmed in The Devil Never Sleeps, but her involvement in Oscar's life and possibly his death is a frequently mentioned theory. Ofelia is disliked for reasons such as the speed of Oscar’s remarriage, her treatment of Oscar's first two children, and her original socioeconomic class. Ofelia refuses to be interviewed in the film during a phone call with Portillo. Portillo’s camera crew films this phone call in the hotel room, capturing Ofelia's frustrations with the interview schedule.

Portillo concludes the film without committing to any one reason behind Uncle Oscar's death. She uses different types of media, explores common themes in Mexican culture, and learns more about her favorite uncle throughout the film.

== Production ==
=== Development and filming ===
The film was funded by ITVS (Independent Television Service). with funds provided by the Corporation for Public Broadcasting. Inspiration for the film came from Errol Morris' 1988 film The Thin Blue Line.

The Devil Never Sleeps consists of a collection of different forms of media, such as individual video interviews, phone calls, photographs, home movies of the family, images of documents, segments of telenovelas, and additional images of the places and things that occur in Oscar's life story. Kyle Kibbe contributed to some of the cinematography in the film as well. Critics, such as Emanuel Levy, have described the film to be “visually shapeless” regardless of the collection of media, but Richard Brody claims it as “thrilling and psychologically complex”.

== Release ==
The Devil Never Sleeps premiered at the Toronto Film Festival. The film was shown on PBS on October 30, 1997.

The film has been released on DVD, for sale on Women Make Movies and on Portillo's website.

== Reception ==
Desmond Ryan for The Philadelphia Inquirer remarked that Portillo used an imaginative range of techniques and allusions to illuminate the investigation of her uncle's death. Emanuel Levy writing for Variety, while noting the film to have "a healthy dose of humor and some introspective commentary", felt its scope was limited and was crudely executed. Despite criticizing it for lacking depth and calling its visuals "shapeless", Levy considered The Devil Never Sleeps to be mildly entertaining. Portillo presenting the mystery of Uncle Oscar's death by intercutting it with soap operas and projecting interviews through sunglasses was described by LA Weekly's Hazel-Dawn Dumpert to be "breathtaking".

Reviewing for The New York Times, Stephen Holden, considered its concept to have promise, but overall thought the films conclusions were too vague and scattered to make a compelling drama. Frank Zoretich, for the Albuquerque Journal, was negative towards the film and called it "pretentious and probably slanderous piece of baloney." Zoretich criticized its use of gimmicks throughout and believed that Portillo failed to prove her point.

In 2020, Brody included the film as part of his "Sixty-two Films That Shaped the Art of Documentary Filmmaking" list. The same year, it was selected for preservation in the United States National Film Registry by the Library of Congress as being "culturally, historically, or aesthetically significant."

Reactions from Portillo's family varied, with one of her aunts refusing to see the film.

=== Awards ===
- 1994 IDA Award: IDA Distinguished Documentary Achievement Awards
- 1995 IDA Award: Best Five Docs of the Year
- 1995 CineFestival: San Antonio – Best Documentary
- 1995 SFFilm Festival: Golden Gate Award, Special Juror's Award
- 1995 Mostra Internacional de Films de Donnes: Best Documentary
- 1995 San Juan Cinemanifest: PR – Best Feature Length Documentary
