= The Mothers of Plaza de Mayo =

1985 film

- Directed by: Susana Blaustein Muñoz; Lourdes Portillo
- Produced by: Susana Blaustein Muñoz; Lourdes Portillo
- Narrated by: Carmen Zapata
- Edited by: Yasha Aginsky; Irving Saraf
- Release date: 1985
- Running time: 64 minutes
- Country: Argentina
- Language: Spanish

The Mothers of Plaza de Mayo (Spanish: Las Madres de la Plaza de Mayo) is a 1985 Argentine documentary film directed by Susana Blaustein Muñoz and Lourdes Portillo about the Mothers of the Plaza de Mayo. It was nominated for an Academy Award for Best Documentary Feature.
