= After the Earthquake =

1979 film

- Directed by: Lourdes Portillo, Nina Serrano
- Produced by: Lourdes Portillo
- Distributed by: Women Make Movies
- Release date: 1979
- Running time: 27 minutes
- Country: United States
- Language: Spanish

After the Earthquake (Spanish: Después del Terremoto) is a 1979 American dramatic short film that follows Irene, a young Nicaraguan immigrant living in California as she faces new challenges—particularly in adjusting to the cultural, political, and economic differences between life in the United States and life in Nicaragua. It was written and directed by Lourdes Portillo with Nina Serrano, and stars Vilma Coronado, Agnelo Guzman, and Leticia Cortez. The film is in Spanish, with English subtitles, and runs for 27 minutes.
