= Eileen Clegg =

American journalist

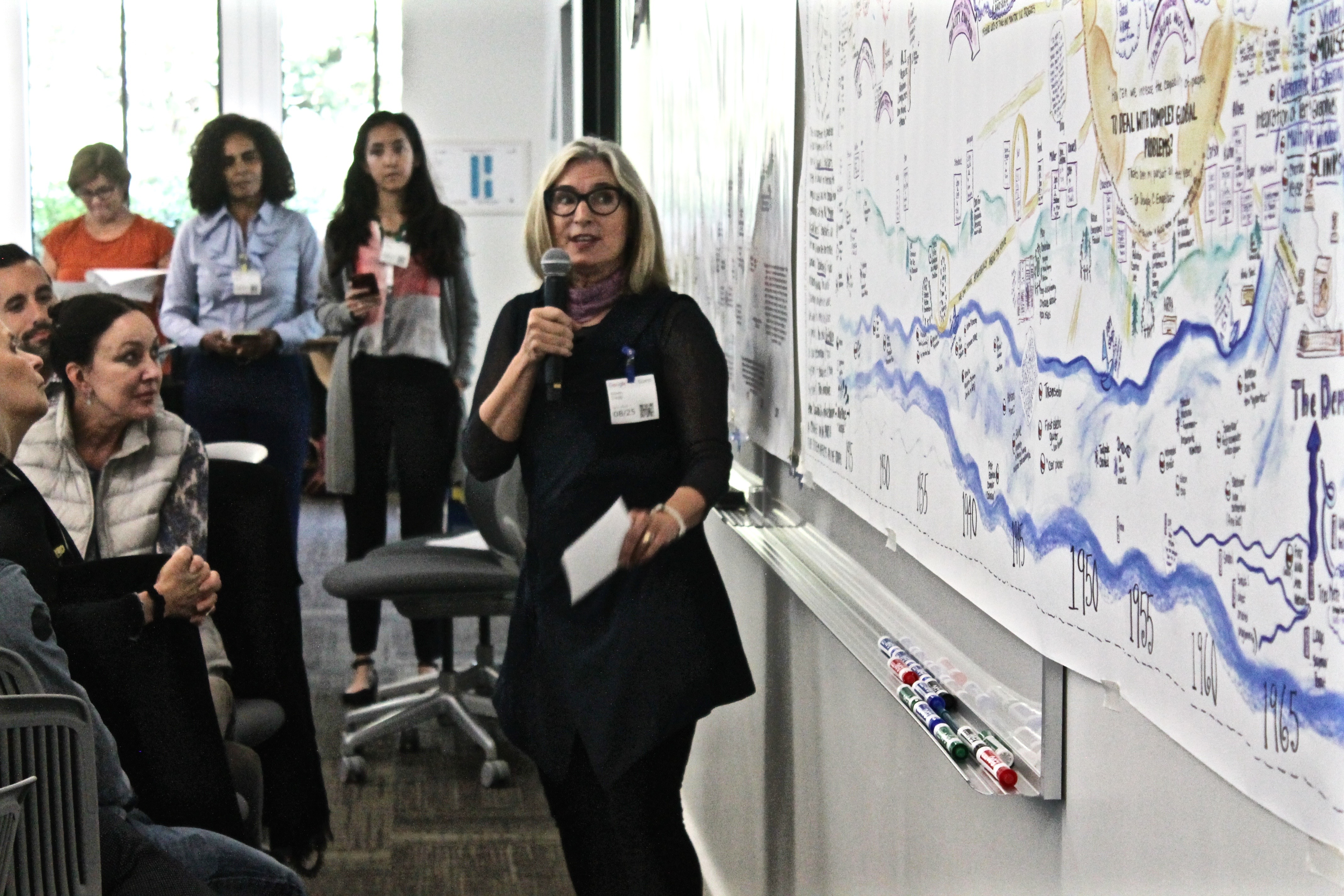
- Eileen Clegg at Future of Text Symposium 2016
- Occupation: Visual journalist

Eileen Clegg is an American visual journalist and founder of Visual Insight. Eileen combines experience with journalism and art as part of an evolving visual language. Eileen's murals are created in real time at a large scale and feature a combination of strategic quotes and ancient symbols to convey the "gestalt" of an event or meeting.

Clegg's specialty is a practical application of ideas developed by scholars including Carl Jung's collective unconscious and Rudolf Arnheim's belief that visual perception and thinking are inextricably linked. Eileen has continued this stream of research with Bonnie DeVarco through their project Shape of Thought.

Eileen uses visual language to report on emergent knowledge and future trends, including the Future of Learning in affiliation with Institute for the Future (since 1999), future workforce/workplaces through the Future of Talent (since 2003), and Co-Evolution of Tools and Technology inspired by her work with inventor Doug Engelbart (since 2002).

Eileen designed and maintains the influential History of Corporate Education, Women Inventors and Innovators, and Co-Evolution of Tools and Technology murals.

Clegg was a daily news journalist for The Press Democrat until 1998.

As of 2014, Clegg is a fellow of the Royal Society of Arts.

== Personal life ==
Clegg lives in Bodega Bay, California. She was married to James Clegg (d. 2024), a marine scientist.

== Books ==
- Becoming a Wise Parent for your Grown Child (1998)
- Goodbye Good Girl (New Harbinger Publications, 1998)
- Claiming Your Creative Self: True Stories from the Every day Lives of Women (New Harbinger Publications, 1999)
- Creating a Learning Culture (Cambridge University Press, 2001)
- Corporate University Workbook (JosseyBassPfeiffer, 2002)
- The Engelbart Hypothesis (NextNowNextPress, 2008) with Valerie Landau in conversation with Douglas Engelbart.
