= BAVC Media =

American nonprofit organization

- Logo since August 2023
- Formation: 1976; 50 years ago
- Headquarters: San Francisco, California, U.S.
- Website: www.bavc.org
- Formerly called: Bay Area Video Coalition (1976–2021)

BAVC Media, previously known as the Bay Area Video Coalition (BAVC), is a nonprofit organization that works to connect independent producers and underrepresented communities to emerging media technologies. It was founded in 1976 in San Francisco.

== History ==
BAVC was founded in 1976 by a coalition of media-makers and activists who, initially, wanted to find alternative, civic-minded applications for a new technology – PortaPak video.

In 1976, The Rockefeller Foundation provided seed funding to a coalition of media makers, journalists, educators, and non-profit activists to complete a study that ultimately called for the founding of a media arts nonprofit. One year later, BAVC initiated its membership and fiscal sponsorship programs. Gail Waldron was hired as the first Executive Director. The nation's first nonprofit broadcast-level suite that meets PBS standards was created at BAVC in 1978. The National Endowment for the Arts (NEA) funded BAVC to begin production of Western Exposure, a series of six diverse programs by Bay Area independents. The first workshop – Color Production – was taught with a Hitachi FP-1020 camera and JVC portable recorder.

In 1980, BAVC opened its Job Center, a space for students, job seekers, and industry pros to network.

As Executive Producer, BAVC produced The Stand In, directed by Robert N. Zagone and starring Danny Glover. One year later, BAVC produced The Life and Times of Rose Maddox, a documentary about the country western singer. The Grass Valley Switcher was installed in the Online suite, and Morrie Warshawski became the new Executive Director.

The BAVC artist-in-residence program was born with the Capp Street Project, sponsoring Mary Lucier, Daniel Reeves, and Francesc Torres. BAVC was the only video facility in San Francisco not damaged by the 1989 Loma Prieta earthquake, and was able to provide postproduction services for all American Red Cross relief reports. In 1991, the organization set up its Technical HelpDesk, initiated the Artist Equipment Access (AEA) program, now known as the Media Maker Awards, and co-published Illuminating Video: An Essential Guide to Video Art. BAVC acquired a ProTools system in 1993 and completed “Brothers,” the first interactive video program aimed at slowing the spread of HIV among African Americans. One year later, the organization was awarded an NEA Challenge Grant to develop a video preservation center. The captioning program was established with funds from the NEC Foundation of America and Toyota USA Foundation. Education expanded to 250 workshops a year; Avid authorized BAVC to be their Northern California Training Center.

The Getty Research Institute and the Andy Warhol Foundation supported "Playback '96," an international symposium on video preservation at SFMOMA. In 1997, BAVC moved to its current home at 2727 Mariposa, tripling in size. JobLink was launched and the first annual MediaMaker Handbook was published. In 1999, YouthLink was launched, and Compaq donated the NT Lab. Their education program offered 500 workshops a year. They produced TechArcheology: A Symposium on Installation Art Preservation, Where Media Collide, a speakers series on the convergence of digital media, and From Promising Practices, Promising Futures, a study of tech workforce development. Two national meetings were held on Building a Digital Workforce.

By 2001, captioning grew by 500% and was certified by the National Association of the Deaf and the U.S. Department of Education. Over 500 videos were preserved from archives and major museums across the country, including The Kitchen and the Smithsonian Institution. BAVC continued to develop its artist-in-residence program and Polish video artist Pawel Kruk was selected. Electronic Cafeco-founder Kit Gallaway partnered with BAVC in 2003 to preserve the historic video piece, Hole-In-Space. SPARK, a [KQED]/BAVC co-production about the Bay Area arts scene, premiered. Also in 2003, Lost Boys of Sudan was completed in BAVC's online suite. The Weather Underground, onlined and closed-captioned at BAVC, was nominated for an Academy Award in 2004.

BAVC and the Community Technology Foundation of California launched the Zero Divide Digital Storytelling Institute. BAVC began to preserve audiotapes in addition to videotapes, with a grant from Richard and Pamela Kramlich's New Art Trust. In 2005, the organization produced PREPUT, a training seminar for public media professionals. BAVC, Film Arts Foundation, and KQED teamed up to produce Truly CA. Jennifer Reeder became BAVC's first HD artist-in-residence. BAVC and Rearden Studios hosted a screening and reception with video artist Bill Viola. Beyond the Dream, a four-part documentary series for PBS, was onlined at BAVC. Youth Sounds merged with BAVC in 2006 to create BAVC Next Gen Programs, a comprehensive new model of youth media training and development. In partnership with Podshow, Adobe and SF Mayor Gavin Newsom’s Digital Media Advisory Council, BAVC Next Gen presented True2Life: Everyday Activities and Youth Changing the World, showing youth as innovative cultural producers and the Bay Area as a model in linking youth to community and industry change. BAVC worked with the Tisch School of the Arts, NYU as well as The Getty Research Institute and the Merce Cunningham Dance Company to help develop video preservation curriculum and training resources for their students and staff. In 2006 Access San Francisco collaborated with PATV (North Shore TV).

In 2007, with core funding from the MacArthur Foundation, BAVC launched the Producers Institute for New Media Technologies, creating space for independent producers, entrepreneurial public broadcasting entities, and the Bay Area's digital media industry to generate cross-platform companion pieces for independent media.

In August 2021, the organization changed its name to BAVC Media, to emphasize its support for other media technologies in addition to video.

== Notable BAVC-Supported Productions ==
- The Stand In (1981)
- The Life and Times of Rose Maddox (1991)
- Brothers (1993)
- Drawing on the Right Side of the Brain (1999)
- The Lost Boys of Sudan (2003)
- Hole-In-Space (2003)
- The Weather Underground (2004)
- Beyond the Dream (2005)
- Plagues and Pleasures on the Salton Sea (2006)
