= ¡Qué hacer! =

1972 film

- Film poster
- Directed by: Raúl Ruiz; Saul Landau; Nina Serrano
- Written by: Saul Landau; Raul Ruiz; James Becket; Nina Serrano
- Produced by: James Becket
- Starring: Sandra Archer
- Cinematography: Richard Pearce
- Edited by: Bill Yahraus
- Music by: Country Joe McDonald
- Release dates: 9 May 1972 (Cannes); 28 September 1973 (US)
- Running time: 90 minutes
- Countries: Chile; United States
- Languages: Spanish; English

¡Qué hacer! is a 1972 Chilean-American drama film directed by Raúl Ruiz, Nina Serrano, and Saul Landau. According to co-director Nina Serrano, "The formal script in the first draft was written by Saul Landau, Raul Ruiz, and Jim Becket. But as the film was somewhat improvised, the actors and I also added or molded the script as the filming went along." It was screened in the Directors' Fortnight section of the 1972 Cannes Film Festival.

== Cast ==
- Sandra Archer as Suzanne McCloud
- Aníbal Reyna as Simon Vallejo
- Richard Stahl as Martin Scott Bradford
- Luis Alarcón as Osvaldo Alarcón
- Pablo de la Barra as Hugo Alarcón
- Sergio Zorrilla as himself
- Salvador Allende as himself
- Country Joe McDonald as Country (as Joe McDonald)
- Jorge Yáñez as Padre Eduardo
- Sergio Bravo as Kidnapper
- Óscar Castro as Kidnapper
- Poli Délano as Old comrade
- Mónica Echeverría as Irene Alarcón
- Elizabeth Farnsworth as Margaret
- Saul Landau as Seymour Rosenberg
- Rodrigo Maturana as Old comrade
- Pablo Neruda as himself
