= KZCT =

- Vallejo, California; United States
- Frequency: 89.5 MHz
- Branding: OZCAT

Programming
- Format: Community radio

Ownership
- Owner: OZCAT Entertainment

Technical information
- Licensing authority: FCC
- Facility ID: 174017
- Class: A
- ERP: 7 watts
- HAAT: 280 meters
- Transmitter coordinates: 38°09′6″N 122°11′25″W

Links
- Public license information: Public file; LMS
- Website: www.ozcatradio.com

KZCT (89.5 FM) is a radio station in Vallejo, California founded in 2006 by David Martin and Katie Martinelli. The station broadcasts a variety of community content including rap, reggae, classical, jazz, poetry, religious programming and sports. Notable artists who have appeared on KZCT since its inception include H.E.R., Nef the Pharaoh, Nina Serrano, and D.L. Lang. It has a silent disco party bus it dubs the Twerkulator.

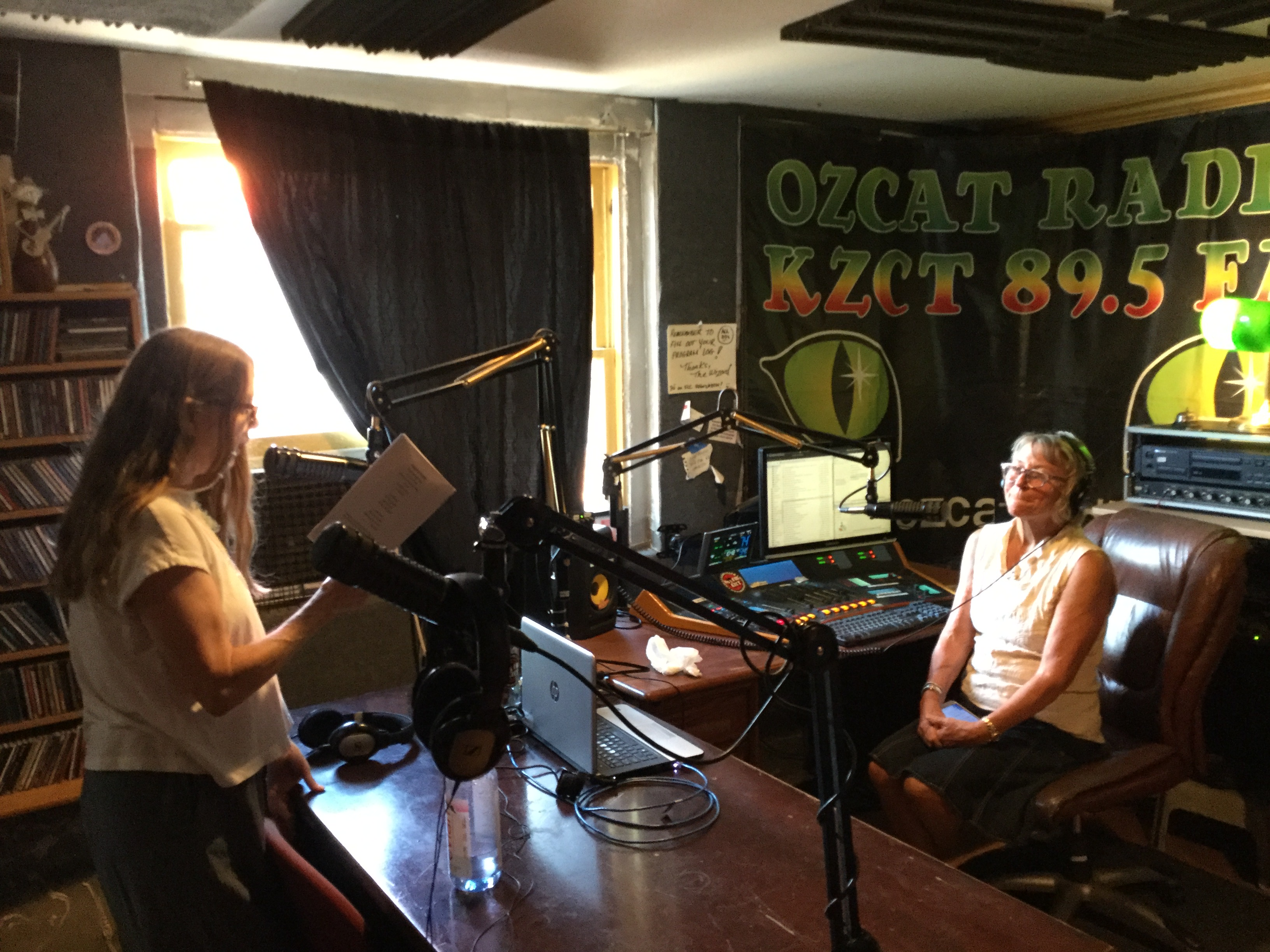
A person reads from a book in the studio at KZCT (OZCAT) radio in Vallejo, California.

== See also ==
- List of community radio stations in the United States
