= Lourdes Portillo =

Mexican film director (1943–2024)

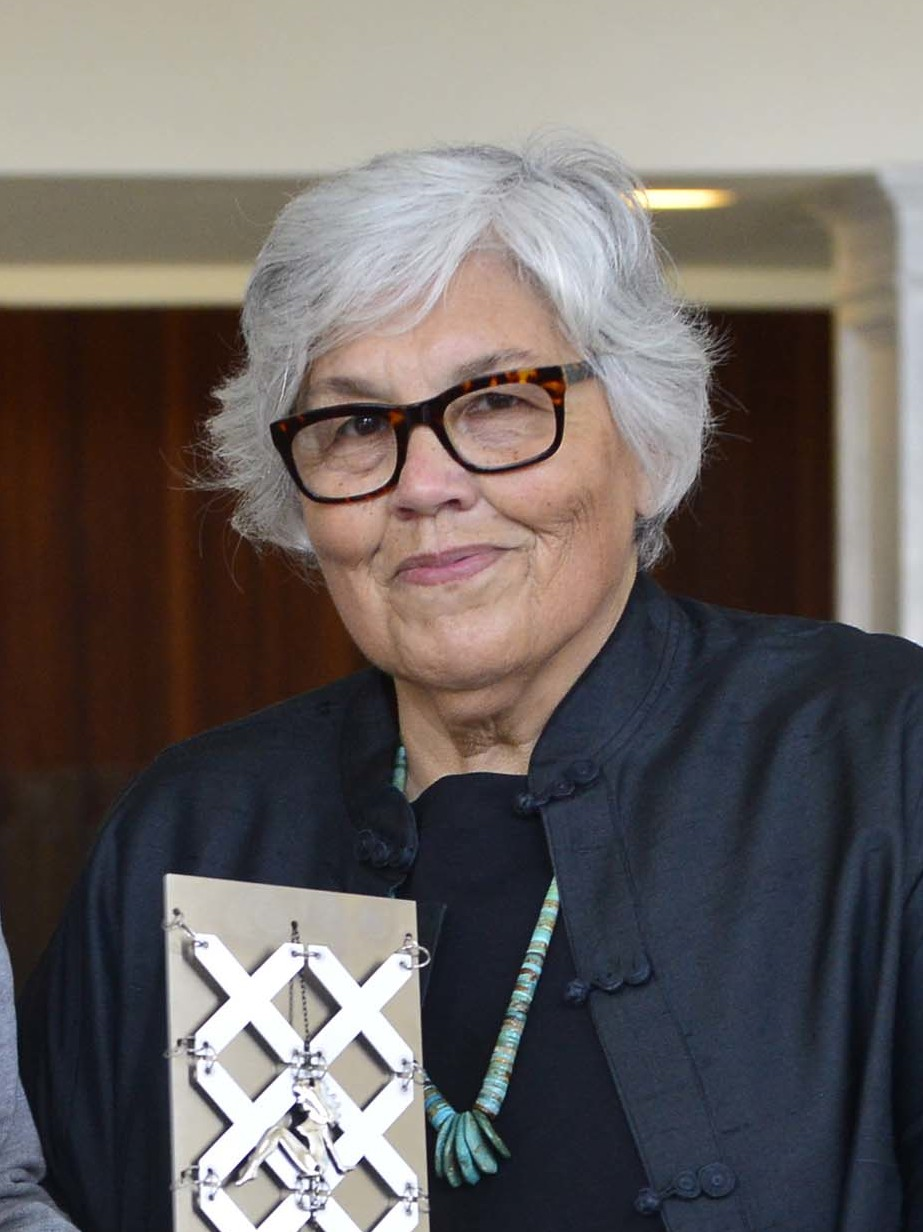
- Portillo receiving an award in 2015
- Born: 11 November 1943; Chihuahua, Mexico
- Died: 20 April 2024 (aged 80); San Francisco, California, U.S.
- Education: San Francisco Art Institute
- Occupations: Film director, producer, writer
- Years active: 1979–2024
- Children: 3
- Website: https://www.lourdesportillo.com/

Lourdes Portillo (11 November 1943 – 20 April 2024) was a Mexican film director, producer, and writer. The political perspectives of Portillo's films have been described as "nuanced" and versed with a point of view balanced by her experience as a lesbian and Chicana woman. Portillo films have been widely studied and analyzed, particularly by scholars in the field of Chicano studies.

Portillo got her first filmmaking experience at the age of twenty-one when a friend in Hollywood asked her to help out on a documentary. Portillo formal training began several years later. She had thus been making award-winning films about Latin American, Mexican, and Chicano/a experiences and social justice issues both as a director and screenwriter for about forty years. Since Portillo first film in 1979, After the Earthquake (Después del Terremoto), she produced over 12 works that demonstrate her work as not only a director, but also an activist, artist, and journalist. While the majority of her work is in the documentary film genre, she also created video installations and screen writings.

== Personal life ==
Born on 11 November 1943 in Chihuahua, Mexico, Portillo emigrated with her parents and four siblings to Los Angeles, U.S., when she was thirteen years old. Portillo's father's job as an administrator of a newspaper in Mexico and his work on printing projects in the U.S. were among the things that kindled Portillo's keen interest in stories. By the time she was in her twenties, she had gotten a job working for an educational film company in Los Angeles, exposing her to her future career in documentary filmmaking. Wanting to work in a more livelier art film community, Portillo decided to move to San Francisco in the early 1970s. She became a participating member of a collective called Cine Manifest, a Marxist collective that created documentaries and was slowly beginning to make feature-length films. She began working as Stephen Lighthill's assistant in the collective's feature, Over-Under, Sideways-Down (1972).

After working with Cine Manifest for several years, she apprenticed with the National Association of Broadcast Engineers and Technicians in San Francisco, and graduated with an MFA from the San Francisco Art Institute in 1985 with special emphasis on vanguard and experimental filmmaking. Afterward, Portillo began her career as a producer and director of films. In 1976, Portillo established her own independent film company Xochitl Productions. She was involved in multiple film communities and panels, working to encourage more Third World filmmakers into entering the film industry. In Portillo's early time in San Francisco, she became very close to La Galería de la Raza, a community-based exhibit space that opened in 1970 and served as a Chicano and Latino art gallery in San Francisco's Mission District. She was part of the CARA Exhibit [Chicano Art: Resistance and Affirmation in UCLA] as an advisor, and was part of the board of the Film Arts Foundation and AIVF (Association of Independent Video and Film).

Portillo died in San Francisco on 20 April 2024, at the age of 80.

== Career ==
Portillo's films generally focus on Latin America and the experience of Latin American–born immigrants in the United States. During her studies at the San Francisco Art Institute, she made her film debut Después del Terremoto in 1979 alongside codirector Nina Serrano, focusing on the experience of a Nicaraguan refugee of the 1972 Managua earthquake in San Francisco.

It was followed by The Mothers of Plaza de Mayo, a 1986 co-production with the Argentine director Susana Blaustein Muñoz who she met during her studies at the San Francisco Art Institute. The film documents the actions of Mothers of the Plaza de Mayo, a group of Argentine women who gather weekly at the Plaza de Mayo in Buenos Aires to remember their children that were murdered or "disappeared" by the military regime. A turning point in Portillo's filmmaking career, the film won twenty international awards and received an Academy Award nomination in 1987 for Best Documentary. Portillo's film audience greatly expanded beyond the U.S. and played a major role in publicizing internationally the plight of the mothers and missing children.

In her third film, La Ofrenda: The Days of the Dead (1988), Portillo focuses on the Mexican cultural practice Day of the Dead and its revival and recovery by Chicanas and Chicanos in the US. According to Portillo, the film was originally supposed to be made alongside Susana Blaustein Muñoz, and together they put in an application to the Corporation for Public Broadcasting to make La Ofrenda. After shooting the film however, both filmmakers realized they could not continue working together and ended their filmmaking partnership. Portillo was left to finish the film.

In 1992, she collaborated with the Chicano comedy troupe Culture Clash to produce the experimental video Columbus on Trial for the international commemoration of Columbus's voyage to the Americas. Portillo humorously mixed political satire and experimental video techniques, putting the figure Columbus in a modern-day courtroom and being charged for his atrocities against Native Americans. They collaborated again for the film Culture Clash: Mission Magic Mystery Tour in 2001. Alongside Culture Clash, she also collaborated with the San Francisco Mime Troupe.

The Devil Never Sleeps (1994), one of her most critically acclaimed films, perfectly encapsulates Portillo's experimental filmmaking style as well as her interest and connection to her Mexican roots. Covering the mystery surrounding the death of her favorite uncle Oscar Ruiz Almeida, Portillo explored the countless dramas and rumors shared by her family members surrounding her uncle's life and death. Breaking away from conventional documentary styles, Portillo directly interacted with the film, questioning everything told by her family members and capturing her thought process as she uncovers more hidden secrets about her uncle and family. From scenes paired with clips of a TV screen playing Mexican telenovelas, to the recreations of family stories with toy props, The Devil Never Sleeps captures the uniqueness of Portillo's experimental filmmaking style. Covering a variety of topics such as family dynamics in Mexican culture, queerness, gender roles, and the distinction between private and public family affairs, Portillo's documentary is not just the story of her uncle Oscar's life and death, but also an analysis of power relations in Mexican society and culture. Recently in 2020, The Devil Never Sleeps was included in the National Film Registry for preservation.

Fast-forwarding to her film Corpus: A Home Movie About Selena (1999), Portillo weaved the story of Tejana singer Selena's life with the significance around fans, the body, and patriarchy. The inspiration for the film came after watching Gregory Nava's film Selena (1997). Disappointed with the film's focus on Selena's relationship with men in her life rather than her life as a singer, Portillo decided on creating a documentary focusing on Selena's fans and sordid details of her life. She was able to gain the support of Abraham Quintanilla, Selena's father, for her documentary and gained access to Selena's music and Beta video copies of performances and footage unavailable to the general public under the condition that Portillo were to follow some of Abraham's film demands and eliminate certain parts he disliked. After abiding to most of the film edits, the following year, after viewing the final version shortly before the film's broadcast on public television's Point of View, he demanded even more edits to which Portillo refused, agreeing to only one of his demands even after threatening to sue her for libel and even attempting to block the national broadcast. Even with the film's struggles to get interviews, media, and its small film budget (around US$130,000), Portillo's film won a Golden Spire at the San Francisco International Film Festival in 1999.

Her film Señorita Extraviada (2001) was inspired after a conversation she had with filmmaker Renee Tajima-Peña in Los Angeles in 1997. Portillo stated that she showed her an article stating the discovery of about thirty women found dead under similar circumstances in Ciudad Juárez, Mexico. Many young women were disappearing in mysterious circumstances and there were no leads on the issue. Concerned with the lack of coverage, Portillo decided on creating a documentary dedicated to these young women disappearing in Juárez, interviewing family members and exploring the many branches of power behind the lack of coverage surrounding these cases.

Since her first film in 1979, Portillo produced and directed nearly a dozen others representing her creative filmmaking style as a visual artist. Her work covers stories across the U.S.–Mexico border and highlights the complexity and diversity of Latin American experiences both inside and outside the U.S. Her work as a Latina filmmaker embraces stories centering women's experiences and analyses the effects of social, economic and political systems working for and against these identities. Influenced by radical cinema, Portillo's work focuses on the combination of art and politics, expressing the uniqueness of hybrid identities like hers and the importance of denouncing injustice for Latino identities.

== Awards ==
Portillo and her films have won numerous awards, mostly from regional film festivals. Selected awards:

- After the Earthquake/Después del terremoto (1979)

– Diploma of Honor, Cracow Shorts Film Festival, 1979, Cracow, Poland

- The Mothers of Plaza de Mayo (1986)

– Emmy Nomination, New and Documentary, 1986, the National Academy of Television Arts and Sciences
– Academy Award Nomination, Best Documentary, 1986, Academy of Motion Picture Arts and Sciences
– Special Jury Prize, Sundance Film Festival, 1986, Park City, UT
– Gran Prix Ex-Aquo, Certamen Internacional de Cine Documental y Corto Metrage, 1986, Bilbao, Spain
– Coral Prize, Feature Documentary, Festival Internacional de Cine Latinoamericano, 1986, Havana, Cuba
– Blue Ribbon, American Film and Video Festival, 1986 New York, NY
– Second Place for Documentary, Sydney Film Festival, 1986, Sydney, Australia
– Prix du Public and Prix du Presse, Women's Film Festival, 1986, Creteil, France
– Best Film, Global Village Documentary Film Festival, 1986, New York City
– First Prize, International Catholic Organization for Cinema and Audio-visuals, 1995, Havana, Cuba
– Among Six Best Films, International Documentary Association, 1986, Los Angeles, CA
– Caracol Prize from Union of Writers and Artists, International Film Festival, 1985, Havana Cuba
– Best of Northern California, National Education Film Festival, 1986, Oakland, CA
– Best Film, Sinking Creek Film Festival, 1986, Greeneville, TN
– Women Journalists' Association Prize, Women's International Film Festival, 1986, Creteil, Paris
– Golden Gate Award, San Francisco International Film Festival, San Francisco, CA

- La Ofrenda: The Days of the Dead (1988)

– Honors, International Documentary Association, 1989, Los Angeles, CA
– Best Feature Documentary, Athens Film Festival, 1989, Athens, OH
– Director's Choice Selection, Black Maria Film and Video Festival, 1989, West Orange, NJ
– Blue Ribbon, American Film and Video Festival, 1990, San Francisco, CA
– Special Jury Prize, Sinking Creek Film Festival, 1990, Greeneville, TN
– Best Exploration of Belief Prize, VISTAS, A Film Festival of Contemporary Folklife and Popular Culture, 1990, Los Angeles, CA
– Outstanding Cinematic Achievement, Best of Category, Documentary Film, National Latino Film and Video Festival, 1991, New York NY

- Vida (1989)

– Cine Golden Eagle, 1990
– Special Mention, San Antonio CineFestival, 1990, San Antonio, TX

- Columbus on Trial (1992)

– Best Video, second place, Visual Artist Third Annual film and Video Festival, 1993, San Jose, CA
– Honorable Mention in Native American Studies, American Film and Video Association, Illinois
– The 1993 Whitney Museum Biennial, New York, New York

- Mirrors of the Heart (1993)

– Silver Hugo, Chicago Film Festival, 1994, Chicago, IL
– Silver Apple, National Educational Film and Video Festival, 1994, Berkeley, CA

- The Devil Never Sleeps (1994)

– Best Five Documentaries of the Year, Independent Documentary Association, 1996, Hollywood, CA
– Golden Gate Award, San Francisco International Film Festival, 1995, San Francisco, CA
– Best Feature-Length Documentary, San Juan Cinemafest, 1995, San Juan, Puerto Rico
– Best Documentary, San Antonio CineFestival, 1995, San Antonio, TX
– Best Documentary, Mostra International de Filmes de Dones, 1995, Barcelona, Spain
– New Directors / New Films, The Film Society of Lincoln Center and the Museum of Modern Art, New York, 1995, New York City
– Most Promising Latino Film, The Independent Feature Project, 1994, New York City
– Inclusion in the National Film Registry, 2020

- Corpus: A Home Movie for Selena (1999)

– Golden Spire, San Francisco International Film Festival, 1999, San Francisco, CA

- Recipient of CalArts/Herb Alpert Award in the Arts, 1999
- Señorita Extraviada (2001)

– Special Jury Prize at the Sundance Film Festival
– Best Documentary at the Havana International Film Festival, the Nestor Almendros Award at the Human Rights Watch Film Festival
– The Ariel, the Mexican Academy of Film Award
– Best Documentary, Cinequest San Jose Film Festival, 2002
– Audience Award for Best Documentary, Créteil International Women's Film Festival, 2002
– IDA Award for Feature Documentaries, International Documentary Association, 2002
– FIPRESCI Prize for International Competition, Thessaloniki Documentary Film Festival, 2002

- Recipient of United States Artists (USA) Fellowship, 2008
- Anonymous Was A Woman Award, 2016

== Filmography ==
- After the Earthquake/Después del Terremoto (1979)
- The Mothers of Plaza de Mayo (1985)
- La Ofrenda: The Days of the Dead (1988)
- Vida (1989)
- Columbus on Trial (1992)
- Mirrors of the Heart (1993)
- The Devil Never Sleeps/El Diablo Nunca Duerme (1994)
- Sometimes My Feet Go Numb (1995)
- This is Your Day/Hoy es tu Día (1995)
- 13 Days (1997)
- Corpus: A Home Movie About Selena (1999)
- Conversations With Academics About Selena (1999)
- Culture Clash: Mission Magic Mystery Tour (2001)
- Señorita Extraviada/Missing Young Woman (2001)
- My McQueen (2003)
- Al Más Allá (2008)
- Chime for Change: Girls of Ciudad Juárez (2013)
- State of Grace (2020)

== See also ==
- List of female film and television directors
- List of lesbian filmmakers
- List of LGBT-related films directed by women
