= Regret to Inform =

1998 film

- Film poster
- Directed by: Barbara Sonneborn
- Written by: Barbara Sonneborn
- Cinematography: Emiko Omori; Daniel Reeves; Nancy Schiesari
- Edited by: Lucy Massie Phenix; Ken Schneider
- Production company: Sun Fountain Productions
- Distributed by: Artistic License Films
- Release date: 1998
- Running time: 72 minutes
- Country: United States
- Language: English

Regret to Inform is a 1998 American documentary film directed by Barbara Sonneborn. It was nominated for an Academy Award for Best Documentary Feature,. After airing on PBS' POV, Regret to Inform won a Peabody Award in 2000.

The film was made over a span of ten years. The documentary features filmmaker Barbara Sonneborn as she goes to the Vietnamese countryside where her husband was killed. Her translator is a fellow war widow named Xuan Ngoc Nguyen and together, the two women try to understand their losses. The film includes interviews with Vietnamese and American widows.
