= Susana Blaustein Muñoz =

Argentine film director

- Occupations: Film director, screenwriter, producer
- Years active: 1980–present
- Notable work: The Mothers of Plaza de Mayo

Susana Blaustein Muñoz is an Argentine film director. She directed four films since she started her career in 1980. She also produced one of those films, the documentary The Mothers of Plaza de Mayo (1985), with co-director Lourdes Portillo, about the Mothers of the Plaza de Mayo who looked for their disappeared children during the Dirty War. This film was nominated for an Academy Award for Best Documentary Feature. Her last film was 1993's Mi casa, mi prisión (My Home, My Prison).

Susana Muñoz was born in Argentina where she lived until 1972, when at the age of 18 she moved to Israel. She worked as a news editor for Israeli television and seven years later, Muñoz moved to the United States to pursue a higher education at the San Francisco Art Institute. Although Muñoz was not living in Argentina during the "Dirty War" where left-wing supporters who criticized the government disappeared, many of her loved ones were. Her sister was forced into exile for 9 years and many high school friends of Muñoz disappeared during the war. As she was so close to the war in Argentina, in 1978 she first had the idea to make a documentary, co-directed by Lourdes Portillo, titled, "Las Madres de la Plaza de Mayo". The film tells the story the mothers of the women, men and children who disappeared in Argentina during the war and their fight to find answers about their lost children. When the two women were interviewed about whether the film has a feminist agenda Portillo responded, "It's a feminist film in the sense that it was conceptualized by women. It's about women. We didn't try to exclude men from it. We tried, though, to deal with the idea that women can do something about the political situation in their country."
