= Saul Landau =

American journalist (1936–2013)

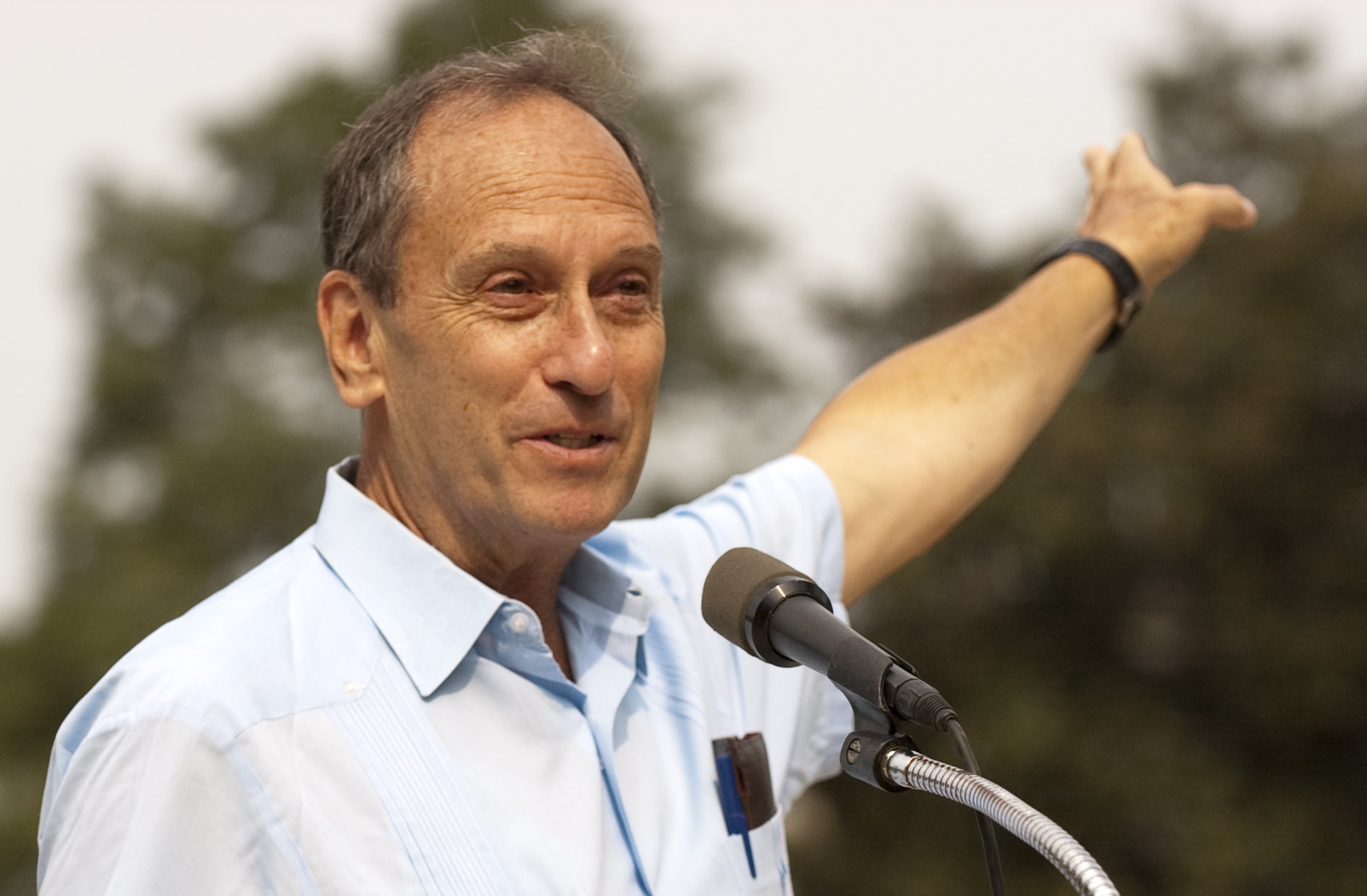
- Born: January 15, 1936; New York City, U.S.
- Died: September 9, 2013 (aged 77); Alameda, California, U.S.
- Education: University of Wisconsin, Madison
- Occupations: Journalist, filmmaker
- Spouse(s): Nina Serrano; Rebecca Switzer
- Children: 5, including Greg and Valerie

Saul Landau (January 15, 1936 – September 9, 2013) was an American journalist, filmmaker and commentator. He was also a professor emeritus at California State Polytechnic University, Pomona, where he taught history and digital media.

== Education ==
Landau was born in the Bronx, New York City. A graduate of Manhattan's Stuyvesant High School, he also earned bachelor's and master's degrees in history from the University of Wisconsin, Madison.

Landau donated his Latin American-related films and papers to the University of California, Riverside Libraries in 2005. He donated his early papers and films to the Wisconsin Center for Film and Television Research.

== Career ==
Landau authored 14 books, produced and directed over 50 documentary films, and wrote editorial columns including for the Huffington Post.

Landau was a member of the Fair Play for Cuba Committee.

He frequently appeared on radio and TV shows. In the early 2000s he hosted Hot Talk, a weekly TV-radio show, for Cal Poly Pomona.

Gore Vidal said, "Saul Landau is a man I love to steal ideas from."

Landau was a fellow of the Institute for Policy Studies (IPS) in Washington, D.C. and a senior fellow and former director of the Transnational Institute in Amsterdam.

He received an Emmy for his film Paul Jacobs and the Nuclear Gang (1980), which he co-directed with Jack Willis, with cinematography by Academy Award-winning filmmaker Haskell Wexler. He won the Edgar Allan Poe Award 1981 for "Best Fact Crime" for Assassination on Embassy Row (with John Dinges; Pantheon 1980) about the murder of TNI Director Orlando Letelier and their colleague and friend Ronnie Karpen-Moffitt. He received the Letelier-Moffitt Human Rights Award for his life's contribution to human rights and also received the Bernado O'Higgins award.

In the early 1960s, he was a member of the San Francisco Mime Troupe and wrote the play "The Minstrel Show." At that time he was also working as a film distributor.

== Death ==
Landau died after battling bladder cancer for two years on September 9, 2013, at his home in Alameda, California. He was 77.

== Films ==
Landau's films are distributed by Round World Productions. His 1968 film "Fidel" is distributed by Microcinema.

- Losing just the same (1966)
- Fidel (1968)
- From Protest to Resistance (1968)
- Que Hacer/What is to be Done? (1971) – Saul Landau, Raúl Ruiz, James Becket, Jaime Sierra, Nina Serrano.
- Conversation with Allende (1971)
- Brazil: A Report on Torture (1971)
- Robert Wall: Ex-FBI Agent (1972)
- The Jail (1972)
- Zombies in a House of Madness (1972) – Shot in the San Francisco jail.
- Song for Dead Warriors (1974) – A documentary about the Wounded Knee occupation in the spring of 1973 by Oglala Sioux Indians and members of the American Indian Movement (AIM)
- Who Shot Alexander Hamilton (1974)
- Castro, Cuba and the US (1974)
- Zombies in a House of Madness (1975) – A short film where jail house poet, Michael Beasley, reads his poetry alongside footage taken inside the San Francisco jail, in 1972.
- Land of My Birth (1976) – The campaign film for Michael Manley in Jamaica.
- Bill Moyer's CBS report on CIA and Cuba (1977)
- The CIA Case Officer (1978) – A documentary about John Stockwell, a former CIA official who served in the CIA for 12 years, mostly in Africa and Vietnam. The film won an Emmy Award (1980), George F. Polk Award for investigative journalism on TV, Hefner First Amendment Award for journalism, and the Mannheim Film Festival first critics' prize.
- Paul Jacobs and the Nuclear Gang (1979) – A political documentary about government suppression of the health hazards of low-level radiation. Paul Jacobs died from lung cancer before the documentary was finished. His doctors believed he contracted it while he was investigating nuclear policies in 1957. Jacobs interviewed civilians and soldiers, survivors of nuclear experiments in the 50s and 60s, testing the effects of radiation.
- Steppin' (1980) – A documentary about Michael Manley on his tour in Jamaica, during election time.
- Report from Beirut (1982)
- Target Nicaragua. Inside a Covert War (1983)
- Quest for Power (1983)
- The Uncompromising Revolution (1988)
- Report from Iraq (1991)
- Papakolea (1993)
- The Sixth Sun: Mayan Uprising in Chiapas (1996)
- Maquila: A Tale of Two Mexicos (1999) – A documentary about the corporate globalization on the US-Mexican border.
- Iraq: Voices From the Street (September 2002)
- Syria: Between Iraq and a Hard Place (2004)
- Will the Real Terrorist Please Stand Up (2012)
- "WE DON'T PLAY GOLF HERE – and other stories of globalization"

== Books ==
- The Bisbee deportations: class conflict and patriotism during World War I, University of Wisconsin—Madison, 1959
- Paul Jacobs; Saul Landau (1966). The new radicals: a report with documents. Random House.
- Landau, Saul, Jacobs, Paul, & Pell, Eve, To Serve the Devil, Volume 1: Natives and Slaves Vintage Books, 1971. ISBN 9780394714592
- Landau, Saul, Jacobs, Paul, & Pell, Eve To Serve the Devil – Volume 2: Colonials and Sojourners Vintage Books, 1971. ISBN 9780394714592
- Carol Kurtz; Saul Landau; Ralph Stavins (1977). Orlando Letelier and Ronni Karpen Moffitt. Transnational Institute.
- They Educated the Crows, Transnational Institute, 1978 – a Transnational Institute Report on the Letelier-Moffitt Murders
- John Dinges; Saul Landau (1980). Assassination on Embassy Row. Pantheon Books. ISBN 978-0-394-50802-3.
- The Dangerous Doctrine: National Security and U.S. Foreign Policy. Westview Press. 1988. ISBN 978-0-8133-7506-9.
- My Dad Was Not Hamlet: Poems, Institute for Policy Studies, 1993 ISBN 9780897580496
- The guerrilla wars of Central America: Nicaragua, El Salvador, and Guatemala, St Martin's Press, 1993, ISBN 978-0312103736
- Hot air: a radio diary, Pacifica Network News/Institute for Policy Studies, 1995 – Saul Landau, Christopher Hitchens, Pacifica Radio ISBN 978-0-89758-051-9
- Red Hot Radio: Sex, Violence and Politics at the End of the American Century, Common Courage Press, 1998 ISBN 9781567511468
- Saul Landau (October 20, 2003). The Pre-Emptive Empire: A Guide to Bush's Kingdom. St. Martin's Press. ISBN 978-0-7453-2140-0.
- Saul Landau (July 15, 2004). The Business of America: How Consumers Have Replaced Citizens and How We Can Reverse the Trend. Taylor & Francis. ISBN 978-0-203-49475-2.
- Saul Landau (2007). A Bush & Botox World. AK Press. ISBN 978-1-904859-61-1. - with Gore Vidal. In this book, he defines his position on the 2006 Cuban transfer of presidential duties, Cuba in the 1960s, Raúl Castro and his opinion on the U.S. concerning Cuba
- Saul Landau (2013). Stark in the Bronx: A Detective Novel. CounterPunch Books. ISBN 9780989763707

== Awards ==
- Bernardo O'Higgins Award for Human Rights
- Letelier-Moffit Human Rights Award
- George Polk Award for Investigative Reporting
- Joe A. Callaway Award for Civic Courage (2013)
- Emmy Award
- Roxie Award for Best Activist Video
- Hugh M. Hefner First Amendment Award
- Mannheim Film Festival: Critics' First Prize
- Ann Arbor Film Festival First Prize
- Berlin Film Festival First Prize
- Best Director Award First American Indian Intercontinental Film Festival
- Golden Apple Award
- Best Picture North Carolina Smoky Mountain Film Festival
- Edgar Allan Poe Award, for "Assassination on Embassy Row"
