= Columbus on Trial =

1992 film directed by Lourdes Portillo

Columbus on Trial is a film directed by Lourdes Portillo in 1992. The 18-minute film, acted and co-written by the comic trio Culture Clash, acts out a simulated trial that Christopher Columbus is put in as they lived through the 500th anniversary of his discovery. The film commences by portraying a variety of journalists and reporters questioning Columbus's motives. They bombard him with all the questions that have arisen over the previous 500 years in regards to the controversy of whether he really did discover the New World for the betterment of the people. This meaning that he introduced European customs and beliefs as a way to improve the lives of the natives already residing in it, or whether he simply invaded these territories in order to impose his own culture and destroy theirs. In this film specifically, Portillo depicts Columbus as a man charged with slaughter against the natives living in the New World. With this film, Portillo supports the reconsideration of “official history”.

== Characters ==
Columbus on Trial contains a variety of characters, all an important part of the message that the film conveys to its audience. The protagonist of this film is Christopher Columbus, who with the help of his Chicano defense lawyer tries to prove his innocence. The lawyer in charge of prosecuting Christopher Columbus is a Native man who stresses the importance of convicting Columbus, referred to as “The Great Assassin". The judge and defense lawyer are Chicanos loyal to their Spanish roots and believe Columbus was the discoverer of the Americas. The prosecutor, on the other hand, is of Indian origins and wants Christopher Columbus to be convicted. Christopher Columbus, for many, was the explorer who discovered the Americas. For others, he was a murderer and a trespasser. This video is a parody of a present-day trial in a courtroom. In this make-believe trial, the viewers see various aspects of coloniality of power, hegemony, and colonial modern gender system.

== Related terminology ==
- Eurocentrism
- Decolonization
- Deterritorialization
- Chicano
