= Greg Landau =

Greg Landau is an American, San Francisco-based record and video producer, and an instructor of music and Latin American Studies focused on the social movements that produced revolutionary music and art.

He has produced eight Grammy nominated records and has produced over 80 CDs and numerous film scores including serving as Music Supervisor of the film La Mission. He produced the album "Songs from La Mission".

== Early life ==
Landau's parents are poet Nina Serrano and filmmaker Saul Landau. He was born in Madison, Wisconsin and grew up in San Francisco's Mission District. He co-founded Round Whirled Records with Camilo Landau and Round World Media along with his sister Valerie Landau. He worked with his father and Haskell Wexler on many documentary films in Latin America and the Caribbean.

== Music career ==
During the 1980s, Landau toured internationally as a guitarist and tresero with the Nicaraguan Nueva Canción group, Luis Enrique Mejia Godoy and Mancotal, and shared stages with Silvio Rodríguez, Pablo Milanés, Mercedes Sosa, Chico Buarque, Amparo Ochoa and Nicomedes Santa Cruz in music festivals and concerts across Latin America and Europe. He lived and worked in Nicaragua in the 1980s before returning to the US in 1991.

According to Alt.Latino host Felix Contreras, "[Greg Landau] is a very important figure in the Rock en Espanol movement in San Francisco in the early nineties. He produced a lot of pioneering music in the nineties and the earliest days of Rock en Espanol in California."

=== Media production ===
Landau has produced work with PBS, Disney, Sony, Warner Bros., CNN, LucasFilm, Six Degrees Records, McDonald's and StarMedia. As Executive Producer at Starmedia, he has produced videos with Christina Aguilera, Carlos Santana, Los Lobos, and Sub-Comandante Marcos. He co-founded Round World Music with Robert Leaver, who owned an eclectic music store in San Francisco. .

He has produced eight Grammy-nominated albums: Carlos "Patato" Valdes's Ritmo y Candela and Ritmo y Candela II in 1996 and 1998, and Peru Blue with Pamela Rodriguez in 2006.

He has worked with artists including Buena Vista Social Club's Juan de Marcos Gonzalez, Susana Baca, Bobi Cespedes, Dr Loco, Pete Seeger, Omar Sosa, John Santos, Pancho Quinto, Quetzal, Carne Cruda, Los Mocosos, Maldita Vecindad, poet Piri Thomas, and David Byrne's record label Luaka Bop. Landau, Babatunde Lea, and John Greenham composed and produced "The African Diaspora Suite" in 2005 for a permanent installation in the newly built Museum of the African Diaspora in San Francisco.

He composed and produced the film score for Haskell Wexler's 2006 documentary film, Who Needs Sleepand Peter and Benjamin Bratt's "La Mission", which debuted at the Sundance Film Festival. He produced Salve a Bahia then Gente! for the Brazilian group SambaDa in 2009, who say he made their work “more fun, more work, more intense.” He also produced work for Mexican singer and songwriter Arturo Ortega. His most recent work was producing an album called Mondongo (Sept. 30, 2015) with La Cuneta, and previously a CD with Mexican rockers Maldita Vecindad, titled Circular Colectivo, that debuted with a splash in Mexico In 2011 he produced the CD, Calma, for Cuban pianist Omar Sosa, that was nominated for the Latin Grammys in the Instrumental Music Category.

He served as music supervisor for the HBO documentary "Mariela Castro's March: Cuba's LGBT Revolution" directed by Jon Alpert.

== Teaching ==
Landau received a doctorate in Communication from the University of California, San Diego. He teaches at the University of California, Santa Cruz and City College of San Francisco, and he researches the role of music in contemporary societies.
