= Corpus: A Home Movie About Selena =

- Directed by: Lourdes Portillo
- Produced by: Xochitl Productions
- Distributed by: Women Make Movies
- Release date: 1999
- Running time: 47 minutes
- Country: United states
- Language: English

Corpus: A Home Movie About Selena is a 1999 documentary film by Lourdes Portillo about Mexican American singer-songwriter Selena Quintanilla-Pérez. It places emphasis on the transformation of Selena from a popular entertainer into a modern-day saint and role model. This documentary uses authentic home videos, news stories, footage from concerts and a debate between intellectuals to analyze the effect of Selena and Selena's murder at the hands of Yolanda Saldivar, the president of her fan club.

== Film description ==
Apart from showing the rapid trajectory of Selena's fame, this documentary also shows the long-lasting effect that Selena has had and continues to have. The movie contains teary interviews from people from every age group that try to talk about Selena and her effect. The film starts off with footage from Selena's death, which is quite unusual based on the fact that most people view death as the end. The effect of placing Selena's death at the beginning of the film gives the viewer the effect that Selena's death was not the end, but the beginning. This film relies a great deal on the interview with fans and family members that describe Selena's fame as influential in their lives. When interviewing some fans at the Tejano Fine Arts Academy in Corpus Christi, Selena's effect is viewed through the way that the performers emulate their idol by swiveling their hips and lip-synching to her songs. At the gravesite we continue to witness the effect that Selena continues to have through the devotion of her followers. Fans leave flowers, Selena dolls and even write intimate letters to Selena, with the faith of Selena reading it. A fan explains this devotion by stating,

“Sometimes, we see people that we want to be like them, not because of their fame, but because of the way they act with people and we just want to share that. Almost every day, we make a tribute to her in our souls, in our hearts, and in our minds.”

Another important aspect of this film is the debate between scholars about Selena's influence. Although scholars can agree on Selena being an important influence even after her death, they differ on that influence being labeled positive or negative. On one hand, scholars categorize it as positive based on the fact that Selena's body breaks away from the norm of a white, thin, blue eyed women becoming famous. Selena breaks away from the preconceived notion that beauty only exists in one form. On the other hand, other scholars do not believe that Selena is such a positive role model. As Sandra Cisneros argues,

"You are telling people to go out there and be sexy and design their own clothes. That’s not a role model that I want for any young girl. And the fact that the only outlet that you have is to be this sexual being singing songs that aren’t even that wonderful and that you have to die before you are 25 and that makes you successful. That’s how you get on the cover of the Texas Monthly, you either get shot, raped or bludgeoned."

== Comparison to other Selena movies ==
Corpus: A Home Movie about Selena differentiates itself from other Selena films based on the fact that this film's primary focus is unlike the 1997 Selena biographical drama film by Gregory Nava which primary focus is on Selena's life through her performances, this film primary focus is interviews with fans, family and friends. Focusing on interviews provides the viewer with a clear example of Selena's effect on people even after her death. Most films, including this one emphasize that Selena was becoming famous even though she failed to meet the set standards of beauty meaning skinny, blue eyes and blonde hair. Yet unlike other films, this film shows the controversy of some people who believe that Selena was not a good influence. According to critics, Selena broke with some preconceptions of beauty yet played into other stereotypes. An aspect that most films about Selena have in common is portraying Selena as a role model for the meaning of success for the working class Latinos. In this film, this idea is portrayed by disk jockey Vicente Carranza stating,

“She was the first one to hit everyone’s soul at the same time. The Mexican community, the Chicano community, the Puerto Rican community, all of them together. La raza del barrio, they all relate to her. The upper-middle class Mexican American didn’t relate to her because they didn’t want to associate with the music of the lower people. And the Anglos definitely did not because of the Spanish. But after her death there is no barrier.”

Apart from most films portraying Selena as virtuous, Selena is also shown as a modern-day saint. This is most evident in this film through the images and interviews at Selena's gravesite. People cry and write letters not just for Selena, but to what Selena stood for according to them.
