= Robert N. Zagone =

American film director

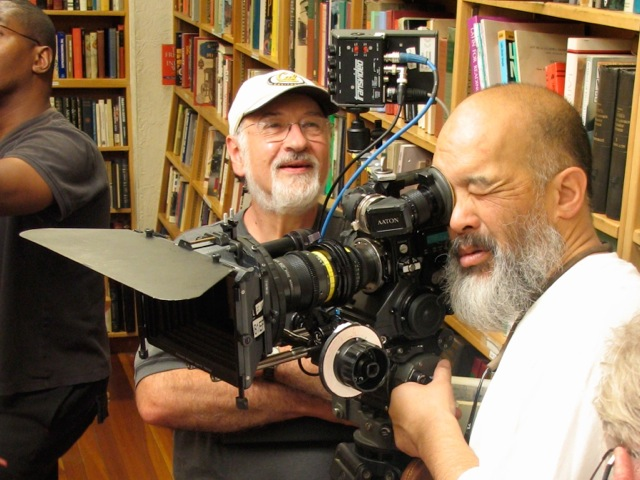
- Robert N. Zagone on the set of Read You Like a Book with cinematographer Michael Chin
- Born: April 5, 1938 (age 88); Oakland, California
- Occupations: independent film director; television director; producer; writer
- Years active: 1962–present
- Spouse: Phyllis Maier
- Awards: San Francisco / Northern California Emmy Awards; Evening Magazine; 1976 (two awards); Short Stories, Tall Tales; 1995

Robert N. Zagone is an independent filmmaker and television director who is best known for his independent feature films Read You Like a Book (starring Karen Black, Tony Amendola and Danny Glover) and The Stand-In (starring Danny Glover). He is also well known for the iconic guerilla-style documentary Drugs in the Tenderloin, as well as many film recordings of the musical culture of San Francisco, including Go Ride the Music, featuring Jefferson Airplane and Quicksilver Messenger Service; A Night at the Family Dog, featuring the Grateful Dead, Santana, and Jefferson Airplane; Big Brother and the Holding Company with Janis Joplin; and the infamous Bob Dylan Press Conference. Zagone was one of the first filmmakers to cover the cultural explosion of the 1960s in the San Francisco Bay Area.

Zagone is the recipient of three Emmys from the San Francisco chapter of the National Academy of Television Arts and Sciences, and is a member of the Directors Guild of America. Zagone is also the author of a memoir about his directing career, entitled Attack the Cameras! Musings of an Independent Film and TV Director, which was self-published in 2023.

Despite their original distribution format, many of the films and programs Zagone directed can be viewed online, including the Bob Dylan Press Conference, Creedence Clearwater Revival's music video for "Sweet Hitchhiker," and The Human Be-In.

== Early Career at KQED 1963–1970 ==
A year after beginning his volunteer status at KQED, Zagone was promoted to producer and director in the Programming Department. Some of the initial live TV shows that Zagone directed were The Jim Kerr Show (gardening), The Ed Radenzel Show (news) Laura Webber (folk guitar), World Press (news), the first local TV presentation of the California Tennis Championship, and the first international soccer match televised in the United States (Glasgow Celtics vs. Munich Bayern).

During this time, Zagone directed and produced many innovative television programs that encompassed both local programming and the National Educational Television network (which eventually transcended to PBS). These included five programs from Ralph J. Gleason's Jazz Casual series for National Educational Television:

- B.B. King's first national television appearance
- The Charles Lloyd Quartet with the celebrated pianist Keith Jarrett
- Count Basie Reminisces with Freddie Green on guitar, Sonny Payne on drums, and Norman Green on bass
- The Woody Herman Band
- The Thad Jones/Mel Lewis Orchestra

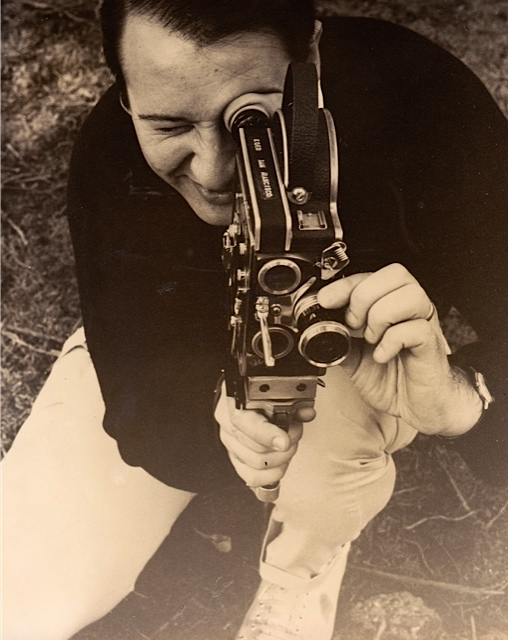
Young Zagone with a Bolex Camera

=== Bob Dylan Press Conference (1966) ===
Produced and directed by Zagone, Dylan's infamous press conference held in the KQED studios was also attended by Bill Graham, poet Michael McClure, and Allen Ginsberg. Footage from the press conference was used in the Martin Scorsese documentary No Direction Home : Bob Dylan (2005) for the American Masters series on PBS.

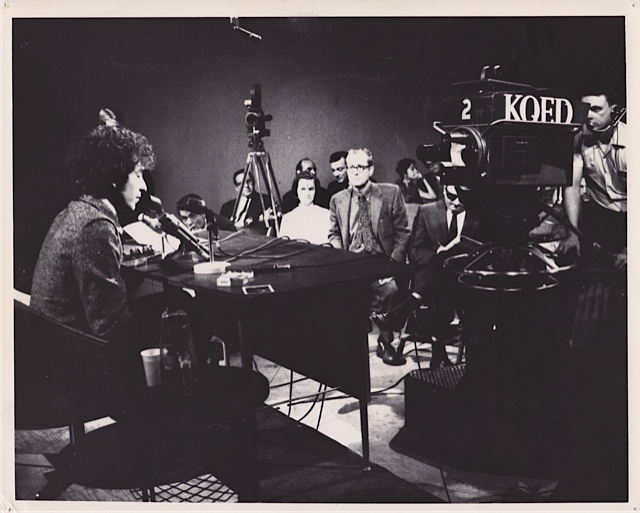
The 1965 Bob Dylan Press Conference, produced (with Ralph J. Gleason) and directed by Zagone

=== Drugs in the Tenderloin (1966) ===
Zagone was given a Reader's Digest Foundation Award to support a follow-up to one of his earlier works,Youth in the Tenderloin. The result was Drugs in the Tenderloin, which went on to win a prestigious NET award for Excellence.

Dormant for over 50 years, the film was recently rediscovered and played multiple sold-out shows at the Tenderloin Museum and the Mission District's famous Roxie Theater. It also was screened for two nights as part of the Another Hole in the Head film festival. It also played at the San Francisco Urban Film Festival in November 2017.

In his review of the festival for Beyond Chron, Peter Wong wrote, "Rather than being a vice tourist, Zagone's camera becomes a witness for the people who live with the Tenderloin's realities 24/7. This approach yields several revelatory interviews…. Despite some sound problems resulting from period technology, this rarely screened film is a cinematic time capsule worth viewing."

=== Come Up the Years (1967–1968) ===
Come Up the Years was a series of programs that focused on the cultural changes that were taking place in the San Francisco area between 1967 and 1968. One of the programs, Big Brother and the Holding Company with Janis Joplin was Janis Joplin's very first television appearance. Clips from this show are featured in the documentary feature film Janis: Little Girl Blue (2015). Later, this performance was released on DVD with the title Ball and Chain. Another program, Human Be-In: A Gathering of the Tribes (1967) served as a visual record of the famous Human Be-In gathering in Golden Gate Park that featured appearances by Allen Ginsberg, The Grateful Dead, poet Michael McClure, and Dr. Timothy Leary.

Come Up the Years was followed by Vibrations (1968–1969), which also sought to document the ever-changing cultural scene in the San Francisco Bay Area. A notable program from Vibrations was A Day in the Life of Country Joe and the Fish which recorded a day in the life of one of the Bay Area's most famous rock groups.

=== Steve Miller Band Music Videos ===
Directed by Zagone and Ben Van Meter, "Sittin' in Circles" and "Roll with It" were the first music videos of the Steve Miller Band. One went on to win Best Experimental Film at the San Francisco Film Festival and the Bellevue Film Festival. Clips of these videos were used in the production honoring Steve Miller when he was indoctrinated into the Rock and Roll Hall of Fame.

=== West Pole (1968) ===
Directed by Zagone and produced by Ralph J. Gleason, this experimental program was made in conjunction with the work of the National Center for Experiments in Television. The show featured the Steve Miller Band, Jefferson Airplane, Quicksilver Messenger Service, and the Grateful Dead. The show also featured live video performances with special effects featuring the rock bands Ace of Cups and Sons of Champlin.

=== Go Ride the Music (1970) ===
Directed by Zagone and co-produced with Ralph J. Gleason, the rockumentary featured Jefferson Airplane and Quicksilver Messenger Service in rehearsal and performance.

=== A Night at The Family Dog (1970) ===
Directed by Zagone and co-produced with Ralph J. Gleason, Night was shot at the remaining remnants of the old Playland Ballroom in San Francisco. The unique musical performance went on from sunset to sunrise and featured The Grateful Dead, Jefferson Airplane, and Santana, plus a jam featuring members of all these bands with the addition of the Steve Miller Band and Quicksilver Messenger Service. The program was augmented by some of San Francisco's most prestigious light show artists.

== Freelance Career 1970–Present ==
=== Fantasy Films (1971–1973) ===
Zagone and filmmaker Irving Saraf set up the film division at Fantasy Records in Berkeley under the aegis of Ralph J. Gleason. Musical "promo films" (aka music videos) were among the first output of the newly formed department. Later, Fantasy Films, under the helm of owner Saul Zaentz, would produce the films Payday, One Flew Over the Cuckoo's Nest, Amadeus, and The English Patient, among others. The music videos that Zagone directed, shot, and edited for Fantasy Records were "Sweet Hitch-Hiker" by Creedence Clearwater Revival, "Shorty Go Home" by Redwing, and "Colorado High" by Jim Post.

After leaving Fantasy Films in 1973, Zagone embarked on a freelance career, directing music shows, documentaries, high-tech visionary videos, and low-budget feature films.

=== The Boarding House (1973) ===
This musical concert series videotaped at the revered Boarding House on Bush Street in San Francisco featured the following musical artists: Esther Phillips, Taj Mahal, Leo Sayer, The Pointer Sisters, and Mary McCreary (wife of Leon Russell).

=== Interface (1974–1975) ===
Produced in New York and Washington, D.C. for PBS, this program series highlighted the cultural excellence of the African-American experience. It was directed by Zagone and executive produced and hosted by Tony Batten. It included the following programs: Gil Scott-Heron, Boston: Busing, Les McCann, Betty Carter, Eubie Blake, Paul Robeson, and Cecil Williams: Reach Out and Touch.

This program had not been seen for over 40 years when it was revived by the Tenderloin Museum in San Francisco. Beyond Chron reporter Randy Shaw said of the program, "Reverend Cecil Williams (pastor), the legendary leader of Glide Church, recently celebrated his 86th birthday. Now, thanks to the heroic efforts of film director Robert Zagone, a 1975 television program on Reverend Williams will be shown December 16 for the first time in four decades. I saw the film recently. It is not to be missed."

=== Inside the Cuckoo's Nest (1976) ===
This groundbreaking PBS documentary was shot at the Oregon State Mental Hospital in Salem, Oregon, the same hospital used in the Academy Award-winning feature film One Flew Over the Cuckoo's Nest. The film included a graphic sequence that showed the preparation, the actual process, and the aftermath of an electroshock treatment for a patient. The sequence was compared to a scene in feature film where Jack Nicholson received electroshock therapy.

=== Were You There Nguzo Saba Films Series for PBS (1977–1978) ===
These seven half-hour programs aimed to create informative and entertaining documentaries about African-American cultural history. They were all produced by Carol Munday Lawrence. The programs included:

- The Black West (1979) examined African-American cowboys and cowgirls and their experiences in the old west.
- Oscar Micheaux, Film Pioneer (1981) was an inside look at the life of film impresario Oscar Micheaux (as portrayed by Danny Glover). The show featured interviews with Bea Freeman and Lorenzo Tucker.
- Sports Heroes: Artie Wilson and Alice Coachman (1981). Artie Wilson was a baseball hero who played for the Birmingham Black Barons. Once baseball was integrated, he played for the New York Giants and then the Oakland Oaks, where he was a perennial All-Star. Alice Coachman was the first female African-American athlete to win a Gold Medal in the Olympics for the high jump in 1948.

=== Fade Out: The Erosion of Black Images in the Media (1984) ===
Hosted by actor Robert Hooks and produced by Carol Munday Lawrence (with the backing of her production company Nguzo Saba Films), this documentary film was shot at the U.C Berkeley Art Museum. The film sought to explore the negative portrayals of African-Americans in Hollywood and the media. The documentary features interviews with screenwriter Stirling Silliphant, Director Michael Schulz, actor Marla Gibbs, producer Chas. Floyd Johnson, among others.

=== The Stand-In starring Danny Glover (1985) ===
This independent feature was funded by the Rockefeller Foundation through the Bay Area Video Coalition. The recipient of an American Film Institute grant, it was one of the first feature films shot entirely on video. The Stand-In was featured at the San Francisco Film Festival and at the Mill Valley Film Festival. Written (with Edward Azlant) and directed by Zagone, the story centers on a low-budget film director (Danny Glover) who unknowingly swaps identities with a crazed terrorist. The film features multiple well-known San Francisco character actors: Marc Hayashi (Chan is Missing); Joe Bellan (Sudden Impact, Mrs. Doubtfire); Jane Dornacker (The Right Stuff); singer Christa Victoria; and comedian Bob Sarlatte.

=== Pancho Sanchez – a Night at Kimball's East (2002) ===
Filmed for Concord Jazz at Kimball's East nightclub in Emeryville, this film presents the Latin jazz favorite and his band in concert. The film was directed by Zagone.

=== Read You Like a Book (2006) ===
Written by Jim Vaccaro, produced by Larry Lauter, and directed by Zagone, this independent feature film was shot at Black Oak Books in Berkeley, California, and featured Tony Amendola, Karen Black, Lorenzo Pisoni, Catalina Larrañaga, Ricardo Gil, Shaun Landry, Joe Bellan, Will Marchetti, Sophia Vaccaro, Bob Sarlatte, Alan Draven, and Danny Glover. The film was screened at the 2006 Mill Valley Film Festival.

== Awards (Partial List) ==
In 1965, Zagone received a Reader's Digest Foundation Award for Drugs in the Tenderloin.

At the 1976-1977 San Francisco / Northern California Emmy Awards Zagone received an award for the Class Reunion/Susan Brownmiller episode of Evening Magazine.

In 1990, Zagone received a reward for Creative Excellence at the U.S. Industrial Film & Video Festival for Custom 800, one of the shorts in a series of dramatic videos produced and directed by Zagone and commissioned by the Pac Bell Media division. The short was a lighthearted demonstration of how people could use the then-new Custom 800 number.

In 1995, Zagone received a Golden Telly Award for The Artist. This one-minute short directed by Zagone was a dramatic vision presentation commissioned by the Digital Equipment Corporation. The film was the opening presentation at a fan event in New York introducing a newly designed laptop computer. The film depicted an artist at work at an easel creating an abstract oil painting that ultimately represented the forward design of the laptop.

At the 1995-1996 San Francisco / Northern California Emmy Awards, Zagone received a reward for Outstanding Achievement in Children/Youth Programming for Short Stories, Tall Tales.
