= Marco Gutierrez =

American conservative activist

- Born: Mexico
- Occupations: Activist, commentator
- Organization: Latinos for Trump (former)
- Known for: Comments about "taco trucks on every corner"
- Movement: American conservatism, Trumpism (former)

Marco Gutierrez is a Mexican-born American conservative political activist and co-founder of Latinos for Trump, an online organization dedicated to promoting the candidacy of Donald Trump in the 2016 U.S. presidential election. In July 2016, Gutierrez said that this group had 20,000 members. He gained significant media attention in September 2016 when he said on MSNBC that the spread of Latino culture in the United States, if it was not stopped, would lead to "taco trucks on every corner".

During an interview with MSNBC, Gutierrez referred to his Mexican heritage, stating that "My culture is a very dominant culture, and it's imposing and it's causing problems. If you don't do something about it, you're going to have taco trucks on every corner". His remarks subsequently met with both sarcasm and criticism, many mocking the statement on social media and sending #TacosOnEveryCorner to the top of Twitter's list of trending topics. Others expressed concern over his remarks, stating that he was using "coded language that politicians and pundits use to get away with explicitly racist messages — from crime to immigration and terrorism". Taco trucks were used as voter registration-information booths in Houston Texas, and a nationwide Guac the Vote campaign was launched. National Public Radio (NPR) news wrote that taco trucks "now straddle the worlds of political symbol and internet meme". He has also argued that Trump's plan to build a wall on the U.S.-Mexico border is both physical and symbolic, and has praised Trump's leadership abilities.

Gutierrez continued to support Trump during his 2020 reelection campaign, although less enthusiastically. He cited Trump's handling of the pandemic, the lack of advancement on the border wall, and a lack of transparency on Trump's tax returns as reasons for his waning support.
