= Latinos for Trump =

American political organization

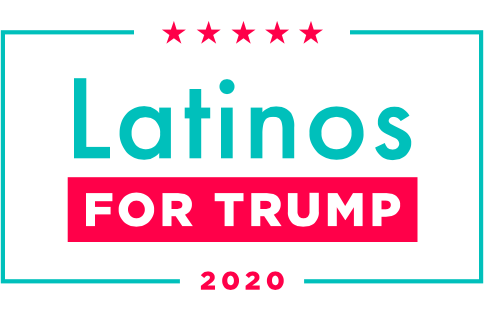
- Logo

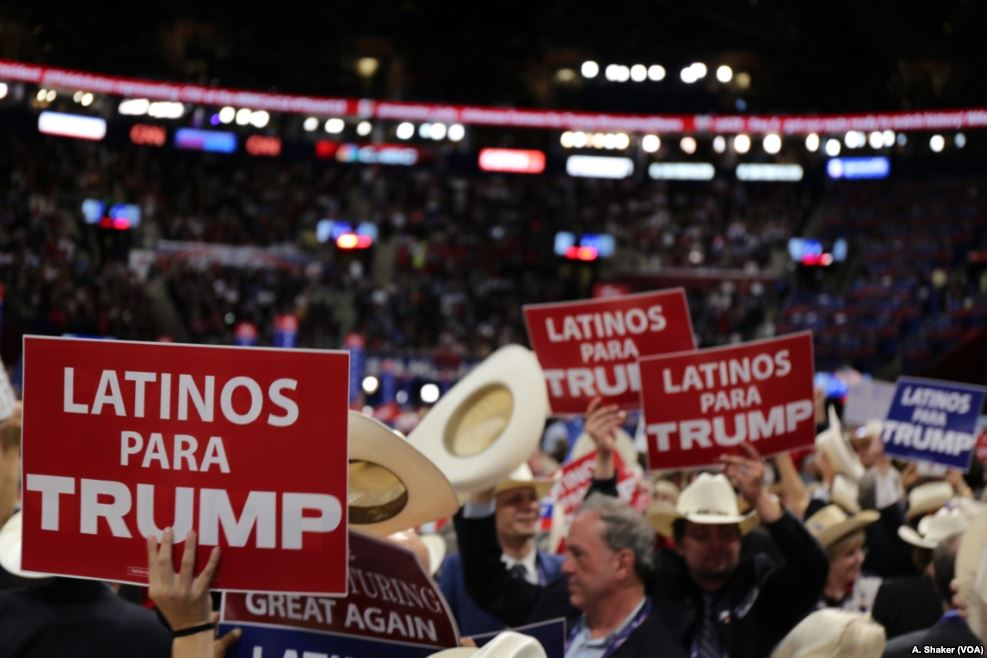
- Latinos for Trump signs at the 2016 Republican National Convention
- Key people: Marco Gutierrez; Enrique Tarrio
- Website: latinos.donaldjtrump.com

Latinos for Trump is a coalition and political action committee of Latino supporters of Donald Trump, formed in the U.S. state of Florida in June 2019.

== History ==
The group has roots dating back to 2016. Mike Pence helped launch Latinos for Trump in Miami in 2019. Jeanette Nuñez also helped lead the effort.

A Latinos for Trump demonstration was held in Miami on October 18, 2020.

In 2024, the outreach group rebranded from "Latinos for Trump" to "Latino Americans for Trump".

=== Leadership ===
Marco Gutierrez is a co-founder.

Enrique Tarrio was the Florida state director of the grassroots organization, and also chairman of the Proud Boys.

== See also ==
- George Lombardi
- Hispanic and Latino Americans in politics
- Hispanic and Latino conservatism in the United States
- Taco trucks on every corner
