= Michelle Jacques =

American singer, music educator

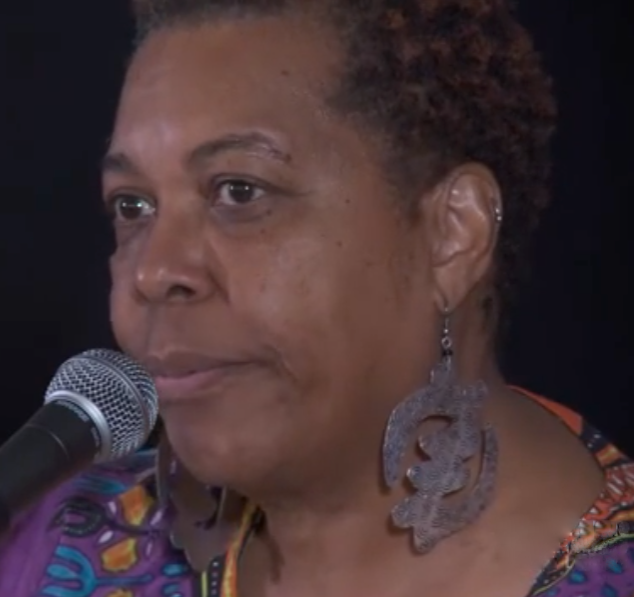
- Performing at the San Francisco Public Library in 2016
- Born: New Orleans, Louisiana, US
- Occupations: Singer, music educator

Michelle Jacques is an American singer, music educator, and Jenpet Records recording artist. She is the artistic director of Chelle! and Friends.

== Biography ==
Jacques was born in New Orleans. She began studying acting, modern dance, tap, ballet and violin, beginning at age seven. As one of the original members of Street Sounds, she has toured throughout the United States and Europe. She was also an original member of Linda Tillery and the Cultural Heritage Choir.

She began to learn about Creole culture, language and history following Hurricane Katrina in 2005.

Her group Chelle! and Friends commemorates the music of Mardi Gras, New Orleans, and Creole music. The group includes Jacques, Rhonda Crane, Jay Lamont and Bryan Dyer, with Donna Viscuso on woodwinds, and Sam Bevan on bass.

She is the recipient of the 2008 City of Oakland, Individual Artist grant, and was awarded the 1995 Contemporary A Cappella Recording Awards (CARA) for writer of the Best Folk/Progressive Song "Home Africa".
