= Nina Serrano =

American poet (born 1934)

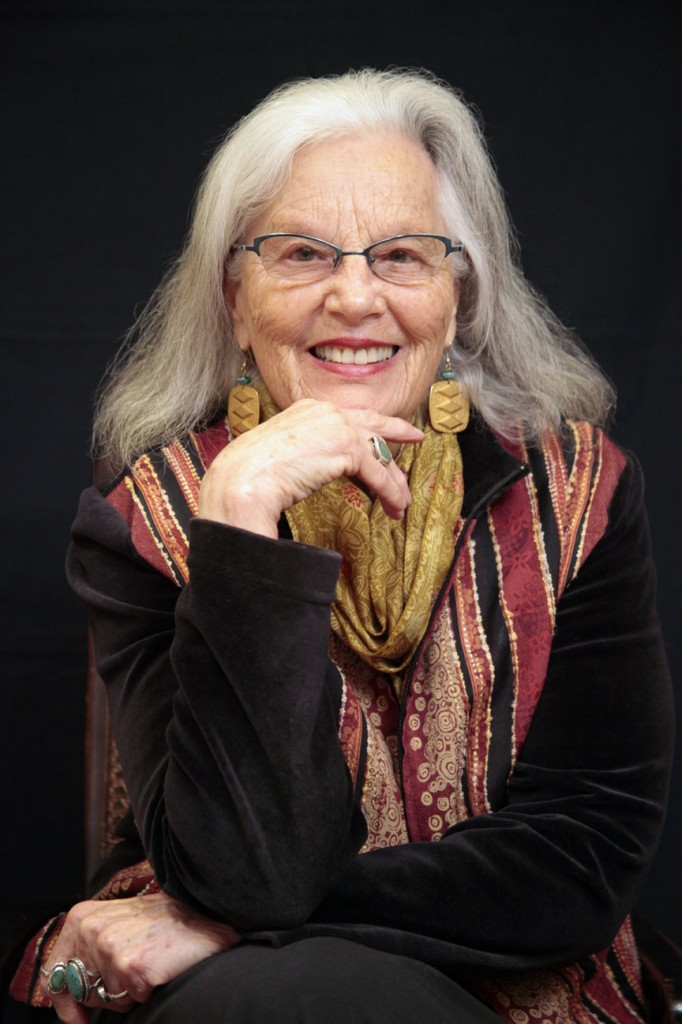
- Born: Weehawken, New Jersey
- Education: University of Wisconsin
- Spouses: Saul Landau (m. 1953; div. 1976) Paul Richards (m. 1987)
- Children: Valerie Landau, Greg Landau
- Writing career
- Genres: poetry, plays, historical fiction
- Website: ninaserrano.com

Nina Serrano (born 1934) is an American poet, writer, storyteller, and independent media producer who lives in Vallejo, California. She is the author of Heart Songs: The Collected Poems of Nina Serrano (1980) and Pass it on!: How to start your own senior storytelling program in the schools (Stagebridge). Her poems are widely anthologized, including the literary anthology, Under the Fifth Sun: Latino Writers from California (Heyday Books), and three anthologies of peace poems edited by Mary Rudge from Estuary Press. She has also translated two chapbooks from Peruvian poet Adrian Arias. She currently leads storytelling workshops at senior centers and elementary schools through Stagebridge.org. She is the former director of the San Francisco Poetry in the Schools program and the Bay Area's Storytellers in the Schools program. A Latina activist for social justice, women's rights, and the arts.

== Biography ==
=== Early life ===
Serrano was born in 1934 in Weehawken, New Jersey to Ida and Joseph Serrano. She grew up in Latino and other immigrant communities in New York City. She trained in theater, studied anthropology at the University of Wisconsin-Madison, and traveled with student peace groups to Soviet Russia and revolutionary China in the 1950s.

While raising her family and teaching, Nina has worked in theater, radio, and film. She helped make movies about Fidel Castro's Cuba, about Salvador Allende's Chile and Sandinista Nicaragua. In Cuba, in 1968, she met Salvadorean exiled poet Roque Dalton and they co-authored a TV drama about the folkloric Dalton Gang and saw it produced on Cuban television. This instantly made her a writer.

Returning to San Francisco, journalism, playwriting and poetry filled the early years of her development as an activist writer. She wrote a series of articles on the Los Siete trial and wrote poetry published in the San Francisco Good Times. In 1969, she joined Editorial Pocho Che, an activist publishing group of Latino poets. She wrote her first book of poetry, Heart Songs, during this period, and it was published in 1980. During the next three decades, she published her next books, Heart's Journey: Selected Poems, 1980-1999 and Heart Strong: Selected Poems 2000-2012, as well as appeared in many poetry anthologies. Through her friendships with Cuban poets, Nina began translating poetry, including her translations of Peruvian poet Adrian Arias. In 1982, she helped translate the Nicaraguan economic program of 1980, available as a bilingual edition from Estuary Press.

In 1972, she joined Communicacion Aztlan, writing and producing radio programs for KPFA. Over the next 20 years, in addition to her on-going radio work, she wrote and produced several stage plays, including The Story of the Chicken Made of Rags, The Story of Ethel and Julius Rosenberg and Weavings. She also wrote and produced film scripts, including Que Hacer? (What is to Be Done?), Después del terremoto (After the Earthquake), and Back from Nicaragua.

=== Works ===
==== Poetry ====
- The Heart Suite Series
  - Heart Songs: The Collected Poems of Nina Serrano (1969–1979)
  - Heart's Journey: Selected Poems (1980–1999)
  - Heart Strong: Selected Poems (2000–2012)
- Stop Monsanto!
- To Die of Joy in the River
- A Poem for You: Learning to See in Darkness
- On New Years Day Unicorns Fly
- A Poem for You: A Sudden Warm Day in Winter
- Love Passed Over Us Like a Cloud
- Traces of Love
- Poems in the Redwoods
- Poems in Balmy Alley
- Welcome Immigrant Children, Bienvenidos
- Tribute to Ralph Maradiaga
- A Winter Solstice Poem for You
- Women I Know
- I am So Visible

==== Films ====
- Que Hacer: What is to Be Done?
- Después del terremoto
- Back from Nicaragua
- La Cantata de Santa Marie de Iquique

==== Other writings ====
- Education for Storytelling
- Assassinations of a Poet: Memories of Roque Dalton
- The Story of Ethel and Julius Rosenberg
- The Story of the Chicken Made of Rags
- Program of Economic Reactivation for the Benefit of the People: 1980
- Nicaragua Way

=== Awards ===
Serrano has won several international film awards, including the XXXIII Mostra internazionale D'Arte Cinematografica award for Que Hacer: What is to Be Done?; and the Kraków, Poland International Film Festival award for After the Earthquake: Despues del terremoto.

Nina Serrano was awarded Oakland Magazine's "Best Local Poet" award in 2010.

In 2024 she received an Adelle Foley Award from PEN Oakland for her work as an author, radio host, and political activist.

=== Personal life ===
Serrano served as an Alameda County Arts Commissioner, and is a former director of San Francisco's Poetry in the Schools program. She was a co-founder of the Mission Cultural Center for Latino Arts in San Francisco's Mission District, where she is still actively involved. In addition, she is a long-time producer of radio programs on Pacifica Radio station KPFA (94.1 FM) in Berkeley, California, currently hosting La Raza Chronicles on Tuesdays at 7:00 p.m. PT and Open Book the first and second Wednesday of each month at 3:30 pm PT. Her programs also air on KZCT in Vallejo.

Nina Serrano appears in the video "Frida en El Espejo/Frida in the Mirror" by Adrian Arias and music by Greg Landau which screened at the SF Film Festival in April 2009. She is a great fan of the band Carne Cruda and their song “Oakland's Tight.” She is consultant for Round World Media and Fig Leaf Technologies.
