= Hey Monster, Hands Off My City =

- Directed by: Michael Meehan
- Written by: Michael Meehan
- Produced by: Michael Meehan
- Cinematography: Brian Sweet
- Release date: May 25, 2017
- Country: United States
- Language: English

Hey Monster, Hands Off My City is a 2017 comedy horror film directed by comedian Michael Meehan. The film stars Johnny Steele, Reggie Steele, Michael Meehan, Jorge Scott, and Johnny La. The movie is a blend of satire, horror, and absurdist comedy, featuring a monster rampaging through San Francisco and a cast of quirky characters.

== Plot ==
The story follows two San Francisco homicide detectives investigating a series of half-eaten corpses across the city. Their search leads to a monstrous creature pursued by a mute gunman on a unicycle. As panic spreads, a group of seniors known as "The Gun Grannies" arms themselves to confront the beast. Meanwhile, the corrupt mayor and police chief, bribed by executives of Krazy Kola, dismiss the crisis. A young Urban Ranger befriends the monster, adding a heartfelt twist to the chaos.

== Cast ==
- Johnny Steele as Inspector Steele
- Reggie Steele as Inspector Steele
- Michael Meehan as The Hunter
- Jorge Scott as The Monster
- Kevin Meaney as The Mayor
- Michael Pritchard as The Chief
- Valerie Meehan, Roberta Borgonovo, Pat Hunter, and Jeannie McMillan as The Gun Grannies
- James Schmalz as Urban Ranger James
- Johnny La as Officer Finklestein

== Development ==
Meehan based the film on a one-man show he performed at the 2011 San Francisco Fringe Festival. Filming for Hey Monster, Hands Off My City took place over two and a half years and Meehan had to continually raise funding for production costs. Meehan has stated that the movie cost $100,000 to make and that he had to make his own costumes and props.

== Reception ==
The San Francisco Chronicle praised the movie, calling it a "fascinating combination of elements."
