= 7th ALMA Awards =

2002 US film and television awards ceremony

- Date: May 18, 2002
- Site: Los Angeles, California
- Hosted by: Paul Rodriguez
- Official website: www.almaawards.com

Television coverage
- Network: ABC

The 7th ALMA Awards celebrated the accomplishments made by Latinos in film and television in 2001.

== Winners and nominees ==
=== Film ===
Winners in bold.

Outstanding Motion Picture

- Bread and Roses
- Crazy/Beautiful
- King of the Jungle
- **Piñero**
- Spy Kids
- Tortilla Soup

Outstanding Actor in a Motion Picture

- Antonio Banderas – Spy Kids
- **Benjamin Bratt – Piñero**
- Héctor Elizondo – Tortilla Soup
- Jay Hernandez – Crazy/Beautiful
- John Leguizamo – King of the Jungle

Outstanding Actress in a Motion Picture

- Penelope Cruz – Vanilla Sky
- **Laura Elena Harring – Mulholland Drive**
- Jennifer Lopez – Angel Eyes
- Pilar Padilla – Bread and Roses
- Jacqueline Obradors – Tortilla Soup

Outstanding Supporting Actor in a Motion Picture

- Clifton Collins. Jr. – The Last Castle
- Benicio Del Toro – The Pledge
- **Andy Garcia – Ocean's Eleven**
- John Leguizamo – Moulin Rouge
- George Lopez – Bread & Roses
- Paul Rodriguez – Tortilla Soup

Outstanding Supporting Actress in a Motion Picture

- Julie Carmen – King of the Jungle
- **Elpidia Carrillo – Bread and Roses (TIE)**
- Cameron Diaz – Vanilla Sky
- Eva Mendes – Training Day
- **Elizabeth Peña – Tortilla Soup (TIE)**
- Roselyn Sanchez – Rush Hour 2
- Talisa Soto – Piñero

Outstanding Director in a Motion Picture

- Alejandro Amenábar – The Others
- Leon Ichaso – Piñero
- Luis Mandoki – Angel Eyes
- Maria Ripoll – Tortilla Soup
- **Robert Rodriguez – Spy Kids**

Outstanding Screenplay (Original or Adapted)

- Behind Enemy Lines – David Veloz and Zak Penn
- The Others – Alejandro Amenábar
- **Piñero – Leon Ichaso**
- Spy Kids – Robert Rodriguez
- Tortilla Soup – Ramón Menéndez, Tom Musca, and Vera Blasi

Outstanding Independent Motion Picture

- **The Blue Diner** **(TIE)**
- Bro
- **No Turning Back** **(TIE)**
- The Woman Every Man Wants

Outstanding Foreign Film

- **Amores Perros**
- The Devil's Backbone
- Rata, Ratones, Rateros
- Vengo

Excellence in Make-Up in Television and Film

- Rebecca DeHerrera – Scary Movie 2
- **Ken Diaz and Jay Wejbe – Training Day**
- Luis Garcia and Jay Wejbe – Road Dogz
- Rosanna Montes – Power Rangers
- Mark Sanchez – The Brothers Garcia

=== Television ===
Winners in bold.

Outstanding Television Series

- OZ (HBO)
- **Resurrection Blvd. (Showtime)**
- Six Feet Under (HBO)
- Strong Medicine (Lifetime)

Outstanding Actor in a Television Series

- Eddie Cibrian – Third Watch (NBC)
- Michael DeLorenzo – Resurrection Blvd. (Showtime)
- **Esai Morales – NYPD Blue (ABC)**
- Tony Plana – Resurrection Blvd. (Showtime)
- Freddy Rodriguez – Six Feet Under (HBO)
- Charlie Sheen – Spin City (ABC)
- Martin Sheen – The West Wing (NBC)
- Wilmer Valderrama – That '70s Show (FOX)

Outstanding Actress in a Television Series

- Jessica Alba – Dark Angel (FOX)
- Rosa Blasi – Strong Medicine (Lifetime)
- **Rita Moreno – OZ (HBO)**
- Judy Reyes – Scrubs (NBC)
- Jamie-Lynn Sigler – The Sopranos (HBO)
- Lauren Velez – OZ (HBO)
- Christina Vidal – Taina (Nickelodeon)
- Lisa Vidal – The Division (Lifetime)

Outstanding Supporting Actor in a Television Series

- **Luis Avalos – Resurrection Blvd. (Showtime)**
- David Barrera – 24 (FOX)
- Alexis Cruz – The District (CBS)
- Demetrius Navarro – ER (NBC)
- Luis Antonio Ramos – The Huntress (USA Network)

Outstanding Supporting Actress in a Television Series

- Lourdes Benedicto – ER (NBC)
- Anne Betancourt – Mysterious Ways (PAX Television)
- **Maria Canals – The Brothers Garcia (Nickelodeon)**
- Marita De Leon – Strong Medicine (Lifetime)
- Alex Meneses – Everybody Loves Raymond (CBS)
- Shelley Morrison – Will & Grace (NBC)
- Jacqueline Obradors – NYPD Blue (ABC)

Outstanding Director of a Television Drama or Comedy

- Felix Enriquez Alcala – ER, "Never Say Never" (NBC)
- Norberto Barba – Resurrection Blvd., "Diez Y Ocho" (Showtime)
- Ricardo Matta – Nash Bridges, "Cat Fight" (CBS)
- Linda Mendoza – The Bernie Mac Show, "The Main Event" (FOX)
- **Jesus Trevino – Third Watch, "Adam 553" NBC**

Outstanding Script for a Television Drama or Comedy

- Rick Najera – Ponderosa "The Legend of John Riley" (PAX Television)
- **Adam Fierro – Resurrection Blvd., "Bruja" (Showtime)**
- Dennis Leoni and Luisa Leschin – Resurrection Blvd., "Compadres" (Showtime)
- Nancy De Los Santos – Resurrection Blvd., "La Nina Perdida" (Showtime)
- Fracaswell Hyman and Maria Perez-Brown – Taina, "Quinceanero" (Nickelodeon)

Outstanding Made-for-Television Movie or Mini-Series

- **In the Time of the Butterflies (Showtime)**
- Road Dogz (HBO/Cinemax)
- The Way She Moves (VH1)

Outstanding Actor/Actress in a Made-for-Television Movie or Mini-Series

- Marc Anthony – In the Time of the Butterflies (Showtime)
- **Salma Hayek – In the Time of the Butterflies (Showtime)**
- Marisol Nichols – The Princess and the Marine (NBC)
- Edward James Olmos – The Judge (NBC)
- Michelle Rodriguez – 3 a.m. (Showtime)
- Jacob Vargas – Road Dogz (HBO/Cinemax)

Outstanding Spanish Language Performance in a Television Special

- **Alejandro Fernandez and Julio Iglesias – "Latin Billboard" (Telemundo)**
- Paulina Rubio – "Premio Lo Nuestro" (Univision)
- Juanes – "Noches De Carnaval" (Univision)
- Lupillo Rivera – "Latin Rhythm Nights" (Telemundo)

Outstanding Performance in a Music, Variety, or Comedy Special

- Christina Aguilera, "43rd Grammy Awards" (CBS)
- **Marc Anthony, "Christmas At Rockefeller Center" (NBC)**
- Mariah Carey, "A Tribute To Heroes" (All Networks)
- Los Lobos, "T'was the Night" (HBO)
- Jennifer Lopez, "Jennifer Lopez In Concert: Let's Get Loud" (NBC)
- Ricky Martin, "2001 Blockbuster Awards" (FOX)

Outstanding Actor in a Daytime Drama

- Maurice Bernard – General Hospital (ABC)
- Matt Cedeño – Days of our Lives (NBC)
- Mark Consuelos – All My Children (ABC)
- Kamar de Los Reyes – One Life to Live (ABC)
- **A Martinez – General Hospital (ABC)**

Outstanding Actress in a Daytime Drama

- Míriam Colón – Guiding Light (CBS)
- Eva Tamargo Lemus – Passions (NBC)
- **Eva Longoria – Young and the Restless (CBS)**
- Saundra Santiago – Guiding Light (CBS)
- Sandra Vidal – The Bold and the Beautiful (CBS)

Outstanding Correspondent or Anchor of a National News Program

- Jim Avila – NBC Nightly News With Tom Brokaw (NBC)
- Arnold Diaz – ABC News (ABC)
- Soledad O'Brien – Weekend Today (NBC)
- John Quiñones – 20/20 (ABC)
- Geraldo Rivera – Rivera Live (CNBC)
- Rick Sanchez – America At War (MSNBC)
- **Elizabeth Vargas – 20/20 (ABC)**

Outstanding Television Documentary

- Accordion Dreams (PBS)
- **Calle 54 (Miramax)**
- Intimate Portrait: Rita Moreno (Lifetime)
- The Bronze Screen (HBO)

Outstanding Children's Television Programming

- The Brothers Garcia (Nickelodeon)
- Dora the Explorer (Nickelodeon)
- **Taina (Nickelodeon)**
- Lizzie McGuire (The Disney Channel)

=== Music ===
Winners in bold.

Album of the Year

- Embrace The Chaos – Ozomatli
- Escape – Enrique Iglesias
- J-Lo – Jennifer Lopez
- J.O.S.E. – Fat Joe
- **Laundry Service – Shakira**
- Shhh! – A.B. Quintanilla y Los Kumbia Kings

Spanish-Language Album of the Year

- Dejame Entrar – Carlos Vives
- La Ley MTV Unplugged – La Ley
- **Libre – Marc Anthony**
- Lo Mejor De Laura Pausini - Volvere Junto A Ti – Laura Pausini
- Mis Romances – Luis Miguel
- Mi Corazon – Jaci Velasquez
- Origenes – Alejandro Fernandez

Outstanding Music Video People's Choice Award

- "El Ultimo Adios" – Various Artists
- **"Love Don't Cost A Thing" – Jennifer Lopez**
- "Hero" – Enrique Iglesias
- "Nobody Wants To Be Lonely" – Ricky Martin and Christina Aguilera
- "Siempre" – La Ley
- "Whenever/Wherever" – Shakira

Outstanding Female Performer

- Christina Aguilera
- Jennifer Lopez
- **Shakira**
- Jaci Velasquez

Outstanding Male Performer

- **Marc Anthony**
- Enrique Iglesias
- Fat Joe
- Ricky Martin

Breakthrough Artist

- Joy Enriquez
- Juanes
- **Ozomatli**
- Laura Pausini
- Lupillo Rivera
- Paulina Rubio

Outstanding Latin Group

- Intocable
- La Ley
- Los Tucanes De Tijuana
- **Ozomatli**
- A.B. Quintanilla y Los Kumbia Kings
- Son By Four

Outstanding Song in a Motion Picture Soundtrack

- **"Lady Marmalade", Moulin Rouge, Christina Aguilera**
- "Miracles Happen", The Princess Diaries, Myra
- "Oye Como Spy", Spy Kids, Los Lobos
- "Polkas Palabras", The Fast And The Furious, Molotov
- "Siempre", Crazy/Beautiful, La Ley

=== Special Awards ===
Anthony Quinn Award for Achievement in Motion Pictures

Antonio Banderas

Entertainer of the Year

John Leguizamo

Ritchie Valens Pioneer Award

Freddy Fender

National Council of La Raza Vanguard Award

Ricky Martin

Excellence in Diversity

Miramax

Emerging Filmmaker

Franc Reyes
