= Tom Musca =

American filmmaker (born 1951)

Tom Musca (born 1951) is an American filmmaker and professor.

== Biography ==
Musca graduated Phi Beta Kappa rom Rutgers University in 1973 and received an MFA from the University of California, Los Angeles in 1981.

Musca's best known work was as the writer and producer of Warner Brothers' Stand and Deliver in 1988. The film was nominated for seven Independent Spirit Awards and won six, including Best Picture and Best Screenplay honors for Musca. Additionally, Edward James Olmos, was nominated for a Golden Globe and an Oscar for his role in the film and actor Lou Diamond Phillips was nominated for a Golden Globe. Stand and Deliver is preserved in the National Film Registry of the U.S. Library of Congress.

Musca has gone on to write, produce and direct for film, television and the theater. He was a co-writer and producer for Hollywood Pictures'Money for Nothing with John Cusack, James Gandolfini, Philip Seymour Hoffman and Benicio del Toro and Samuel Goldwyn's Tortilla Soup starring Hector Elizondo and Raquel Welch. He wrote and directed Melting Pot aka Race starring Paul Rodriguez and was a writer for Disney Channel's Gotta Kick It Up! starring America Ferrera.

Since 2010 Musca has been the head of the MFA Screenwriting track and Professor of Professional Practice at the University of Miami School of Communication. Since that time he has gone on to become one of Miami's most prolific producers; in 2020 he wrote, produced and directed Chateau Vato, a rags to riches comedy set in Miami and his fourth film for HBO. On March 9, 2023, he premiered Dying To Direct, a thirty minute film based on one of his short stories at the 40th Annual Miami Film Festival, which he wrote, produced and co-directed. Aguadilla, his film noir thriller premiered at Cinequest Film Festival in 2025 and the 42nd Annual Miami Film Festival, his fifth film to be showcased at this prestigious forum.

== Filmography ==
- Little Nikita (story) 1988
- Stand and Deliver (writer/producer) 1988
- Money for Nothing (writer/producer) 1993
- Melting Pot (film) aka Race (writer/director) 1998
- Flight of Fancy aka Facing Fear (writer/producer/second unit director) 2000
- Tortilla Soup (writer, producer) 2001
- Gotta Kick it Up! Writer (2001)
- Make Love Great Again (producer, additional writing, actor) 2018
- Chateau Vato (writer/director/producer) 2020
- Amaraica (producer) 2021
- Dying to Direct (writer, director, producer) 2023
- Aguadilla (writer, producer, director) 2025
