= Dockworker =

Occupation of loading and unloading ships

Occupation
- Synonyms: Stevedore
- Activity sectors: Shipping

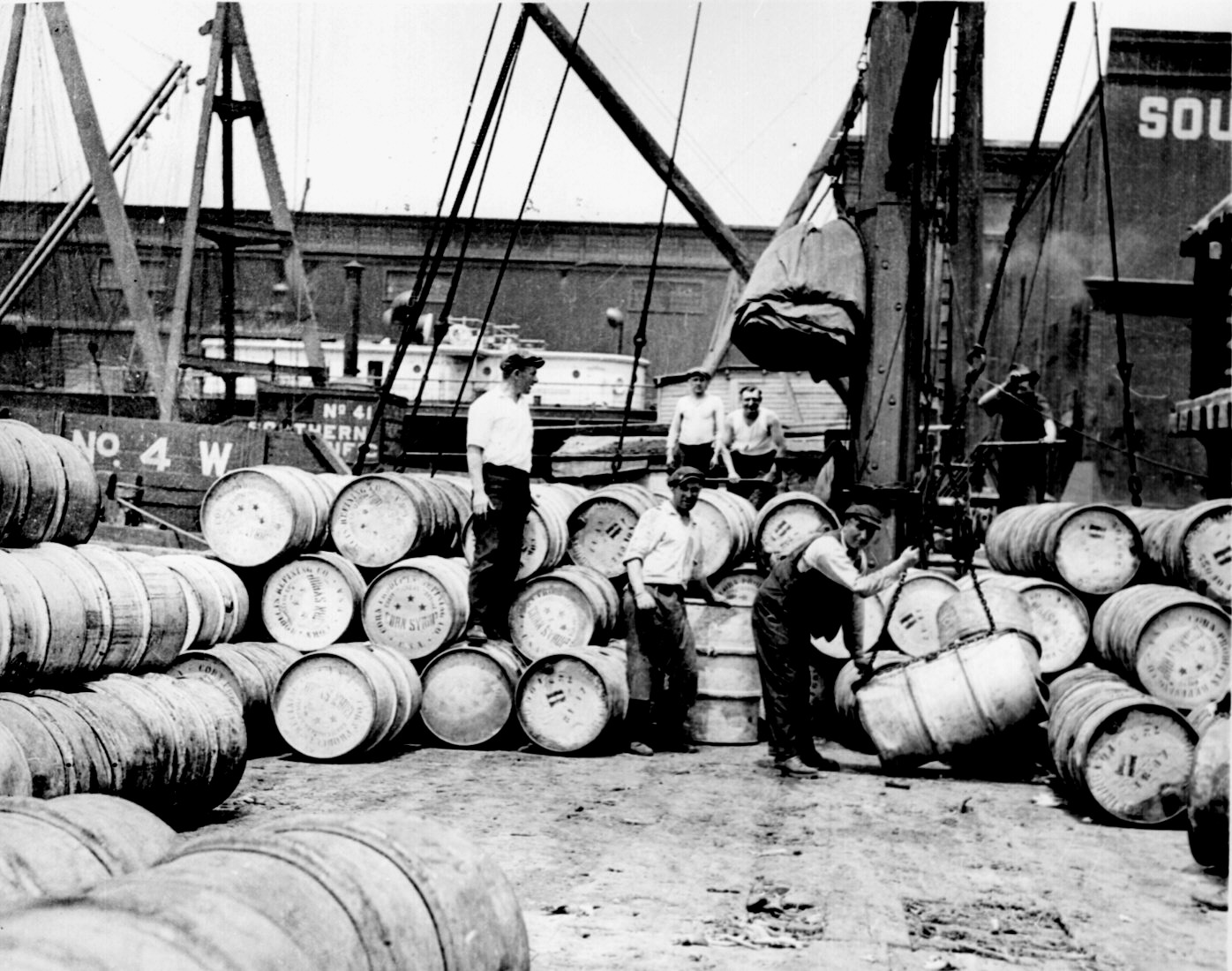
Longshoremen on a New York dock load barrels onto a barge on the Hudson River. Photograph by Lewis Hine, c. 1912.

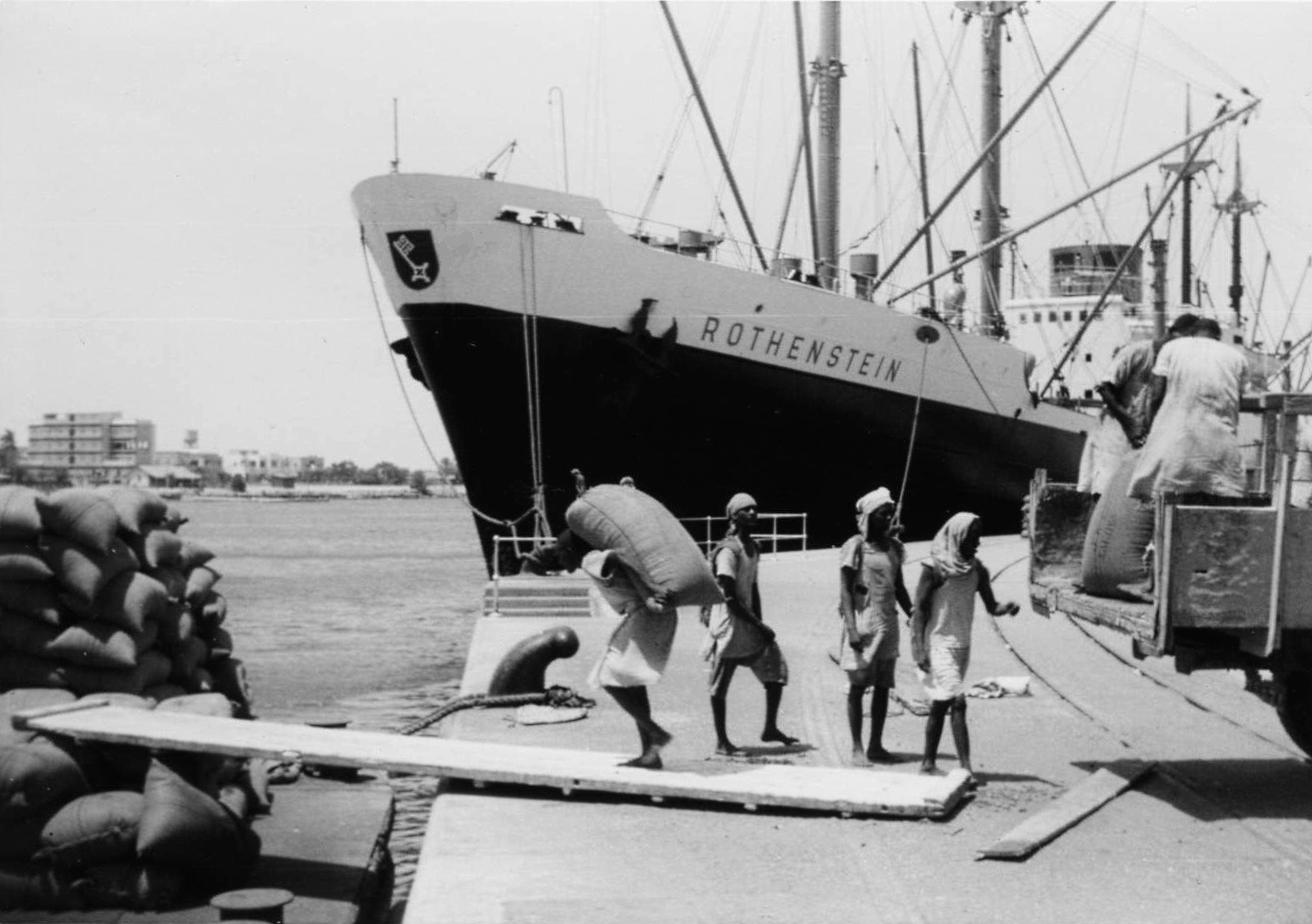
Dockers load bagged cargo onto a barge in Port Sudan, 1960

A dockworker (also called a docker, longshoreman, lumper, stevedore, wharfman or wharfie) is a waterfront manual laborer who loads and unloads ships.

As a result of the intermodal shipping container revolution, the required number of dockworkers has declined by over 90% since the 1960s.

== Etymology ==
The word stevedore (/ˈstiːvɪˌdɔːr/) originated in Portugal or Spain, and entered the English language through its use by sailors. It started as a phonetic spelling of estivador (Portuguese) or estibador (Spanish), meaning a man who loads ships and stows cargo, which was the original meaning of stevedore (though there is a secondary meaning of "a man who stuffs" in Spanish); compare Latin stīpāre meaning to stuff, as in to fill with stuffing. In Ancient and Modern Greek, the verb στοιβάζω (stivazo) means pile up. In Great Britain and Ireland, people who load and unload ships are usually called dockers; in Australia, they are called stevedores, dockworkers or wharfies; and, in the United States and Canada, the term longshoreman, derived from man-along-the-shore (or alongshore + man), is used. Before the extensive use of container ships and shore-based handling machinery in the United States, longshoremen referred exclusively to the dockworkers, while stevedores, part of a separate trade union, worked on the ships operating their cranes and moving cargo.

== Loading and unloading ships ==
Loading and unloading ships requires knowledge of the operation of loading equipment, the proper techniques for lifting and stowing cargo, and the correct handling of hazardous materials. In addition, workers must be physically strong and able to follow orders attentively. Many longshoremen are needed to unload a ship. A ship can only be at a port for a limited amount of time, so their work must be completed quickly.

In earlier days before the introduction of containerization, men who loaded and unloaded ships had to tie down cargoes with rope. A type of stopper knot is called the stevedore knot. Securely tying up parcels of goods is called stevedore lashing or stevedore knotting. While loading a general cargo vessel, they use dunnage, which are pieces of wood (or nowadays sometimes strong inflatable dunnage bags) set down to keep the cargo out of any water that might be lying in the hold or are placed as shims between cargo crates for load securing.

Today, the vast majority of non-bulk cargo is transported in intermodal containers. The containers arrive at a port by truck, rail, or another ship and are stacked in the port's storage area. When the vessel that will be transporting them arrives, the containers it is offloading are unloaded by a crane. The containers either leave the port by truck or rail or are stored until they are placed on another ship. Once the ship is offloaded, the containers it leaves with are brought to the dock by truck. A crane lifts the containers from the trucks onto the ship. As the containers pile up on the ship, the workers connect them to the vessel and the other already-placed containers. The jobs involved include the crane operators, the workers who connect the containers to the ship and each other, the truck drivers who transport the containers from the dock and storage area, the workers who track the containers in the storage area as they are loaded and unloaded, as well as various supervisors. Those workers at the port who handle and move the containers are likely to be considered stevedores or dockworkers.

Before containerization, freight was often handled with a longshoreman's hook, a tool which became emblematic of the profession (mainly on the west coast of the United States and Canada).

Traditionally, stevedores had no fixed job but would arrive at the docks in the morning seeking employment for the day. London dockers called this practice standing on the stones, while in the United States, it was referred to as shaping up or assembling for the shape-up.

Dock workers have been a prominent part of the modern labor movement.

Container handling in Hong Kong – 2005

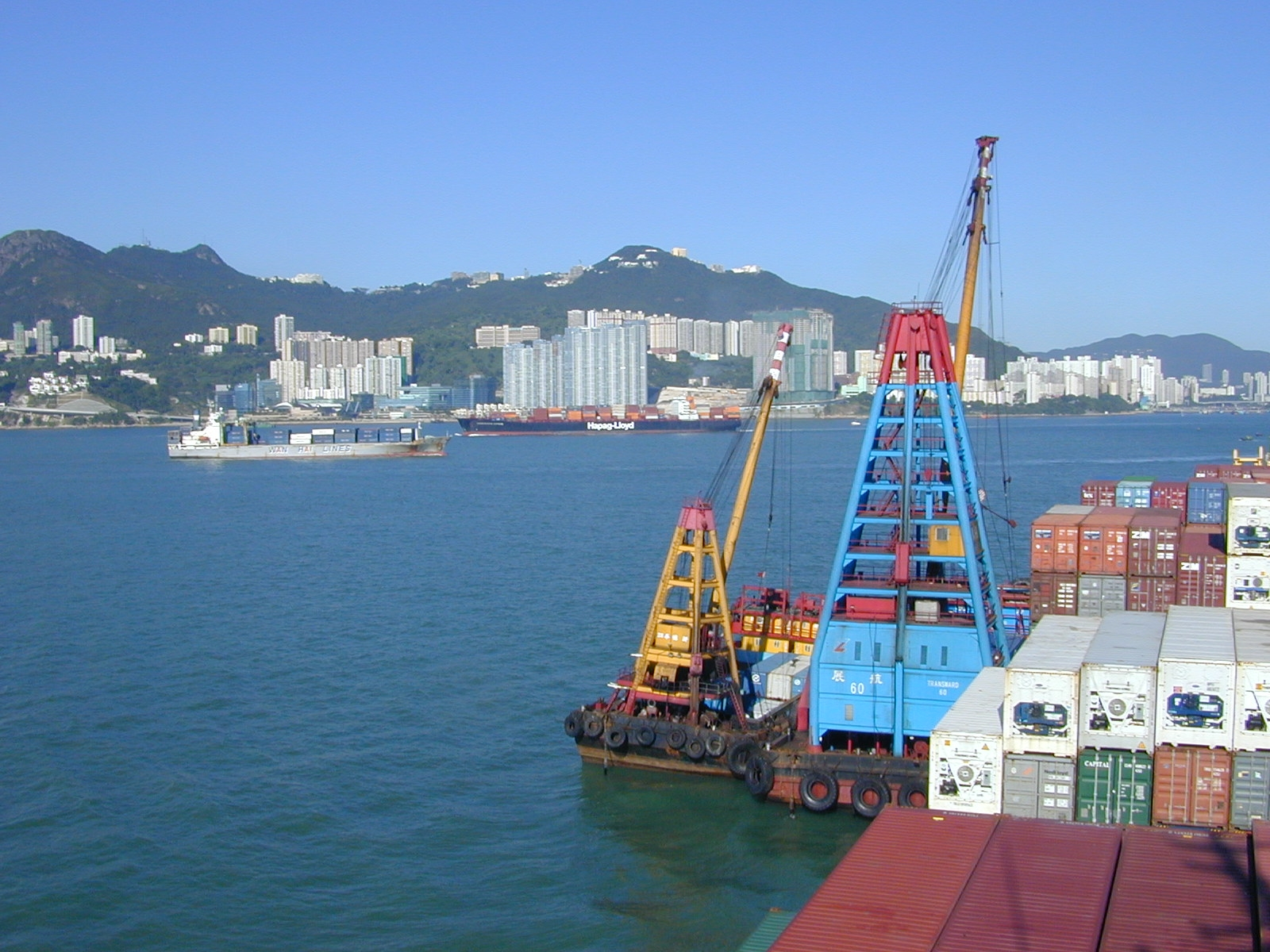
At anchor, two barges with cranes (floating derricks) at port

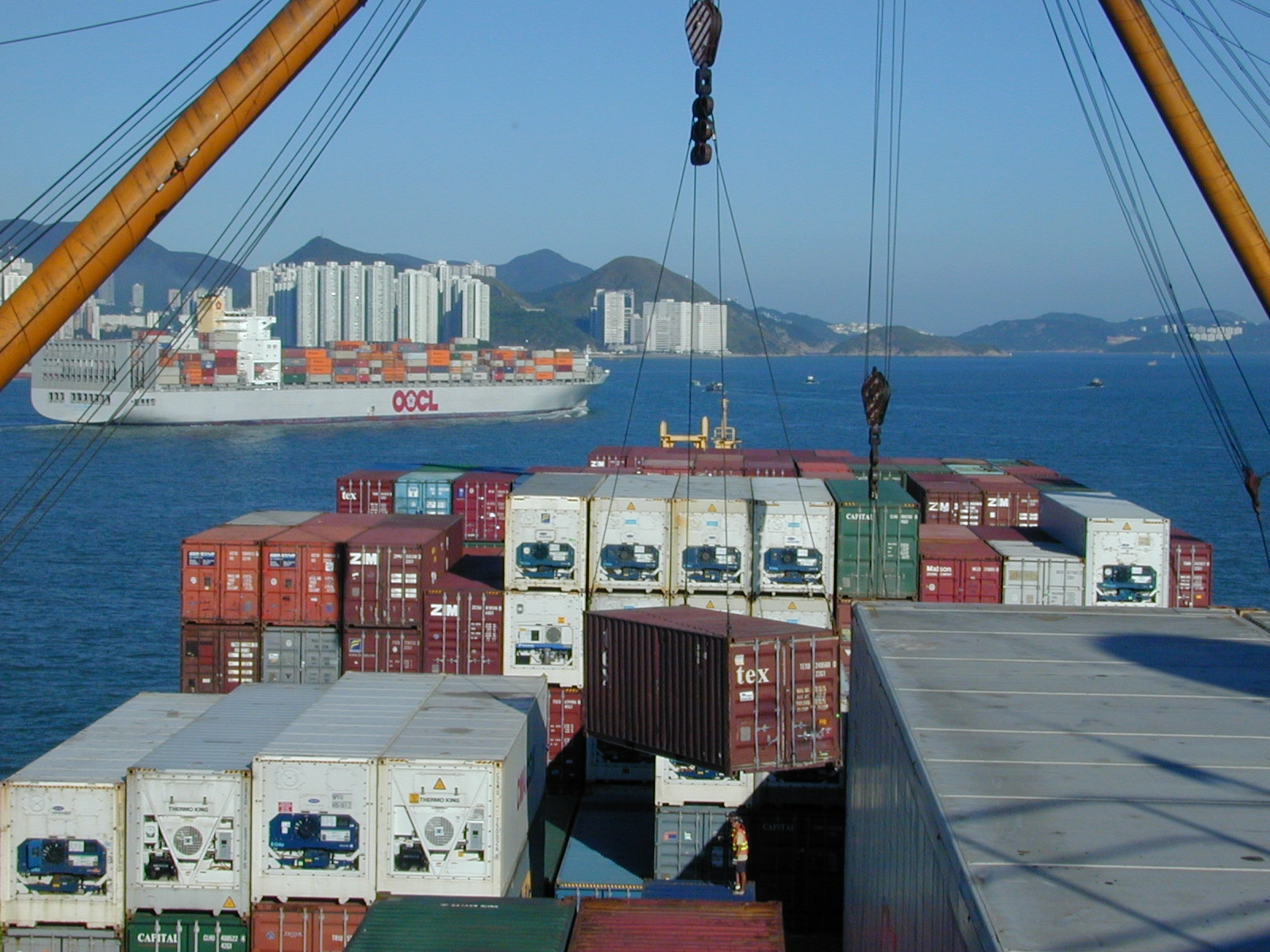
A container is lifted from the deck.

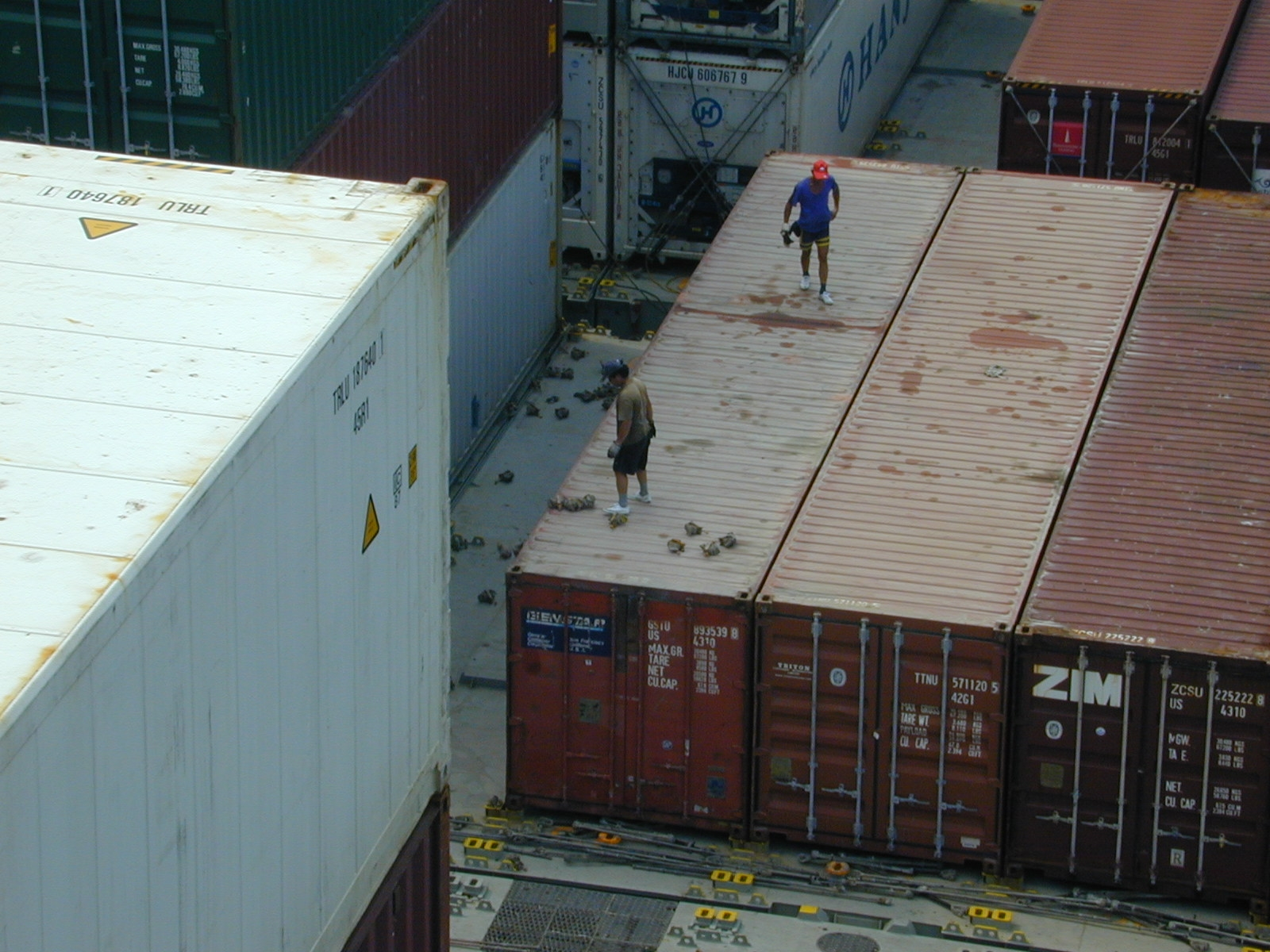
Dockworkers on the containers in the ship's hatch

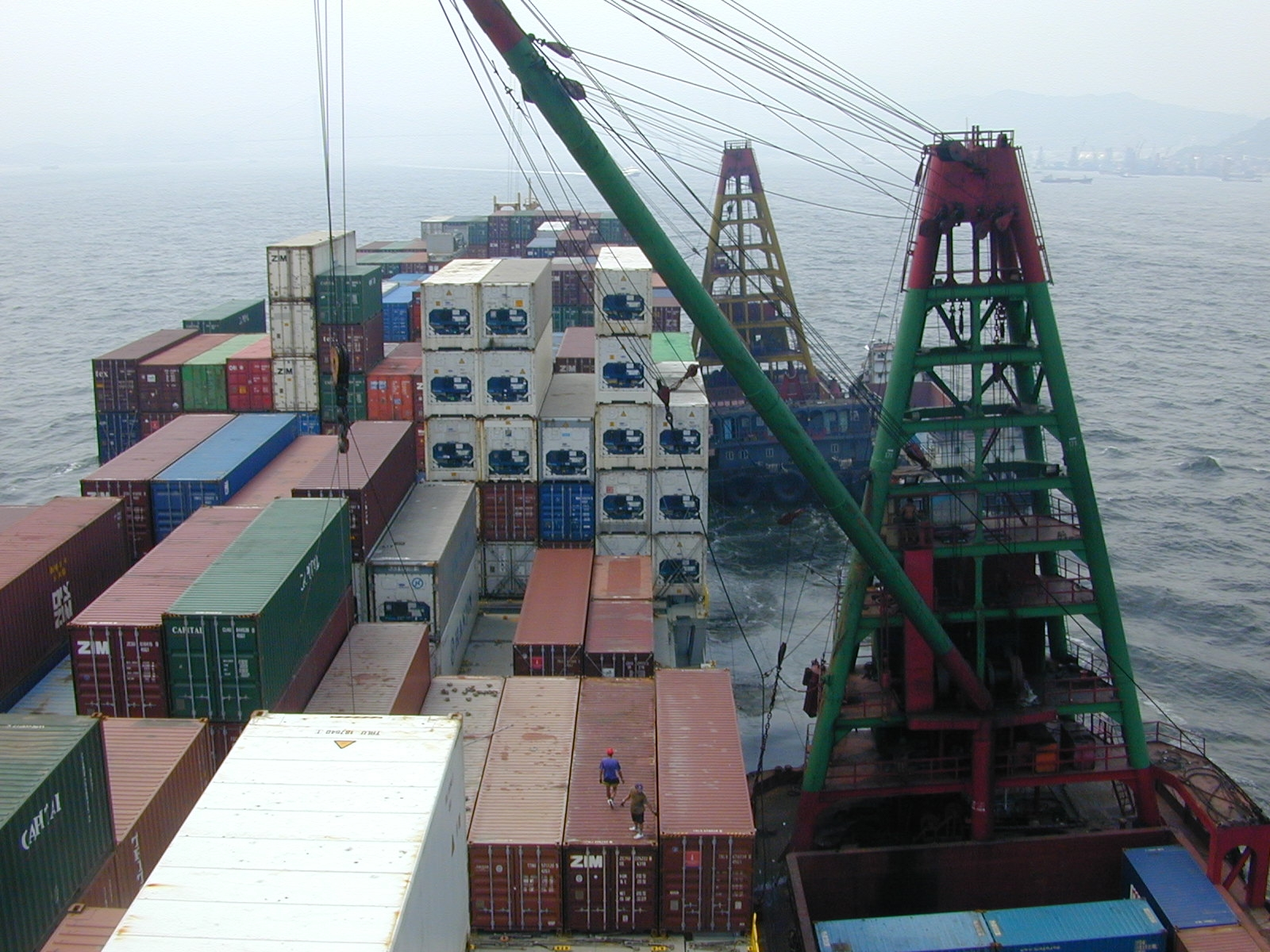
Strong tidal current, loading work in adverse conditions

== Notable dockworkers ==
Former stevedores and dockworkers include:

- Crispus Attucks – First American to be killed in the American Revolution at the Boston Massacre
- Harry Bridges – founder of the International Longshore and Warehouse Union (ILWU)
- Joey Coyle – basis for the movie Money for Nothing
- Jack Dash – British dock workers' trade union leader
- Peter Fraser – Prime Minister of New Zealand (1940–1949)
- Danny Greene – American mobster
- Eric Hoffer – philosopher and social critic
- Hulk Hogan – professional wrestler
- Patrick Joseph "P.J." Kennedy – American businessman and grandfather of 35th U.S. President John F. Kennedy
- Artie Lange – actor and comedian
- Jacques Loew – French Catholic priest who began the worker priest movement as a dockworker in Marseille
- Tom Mann – British trade unionist and organizer of the London Dock Strike of 1889
- Peter MacKay – Canadian former government minister and conservative party leader (a stevedore for two summers while a teenager)
- Bruce Nelson – labor historian, author of Workers on the Waterfront
- Benito Quinquela Martín – painter from Buenos Aires, Argentina. His works reflect the work at the docks in La Boca, a portuary district of Buenos Aires.
- Keith William Richards - Actor
- Stan Weir – blue-collar intellectual and sociologist, founder of Singlejack Press

== In popular culture ==
- In 1949, reporter Malcolm Johnson was awarded a Pulitzer Prize for a 24-part investigative series titled Crime on the Waterfront, published in the New York Sun.
- The material from Malcolm Johnson's investigative series was fictionalized and used as a basis for the influential film On the Waterfront (1954), starring Marlon Brando as a longshoreman, and the working conditions on the docks figure significantly in the film's plot. On the Waterfront was a critical and commercial success that received twelve Academy Award nominations and won eight, including Best Picture, Best Actor for Brando, Best Supporting Actress for Eva Marie Saint, and Best Director for Elia Kazan. The American Film Institute ranked it the 8th-greatest American movie of all time in 1997 and 19th in 2007.
- Playwright Arthur Miller was involved in the early stages of the development of On the Waterfront; his play A View from the Bridge (1955) also deals with the troubled life of a longshoreman.
- In season 2 of the HBO series The Wire, which first aired in 2003, the Stevedore Union and its members working in Baltimore, particularly Frank Sobotka, figure prominently in the second season's story.
- The 2013 video game Grand Theft Auto V features a character, Floyd Hebert, who works as a longshoreman at the city port. One of the main characters, Trevor Philips, uses Floyd's job to prepare a cargo ship robbery during the game's storyline.

== See also ==
- 1913 Sligo Dock strike
- Admiralty law
- Battle of Ballantyne Pier (Canada)
- Dockers Union (disambiguation)
- Dunnage
- Federated Ship Painters and Dockers Union
- History of Squamish and Tsleil-Waututh longshoremen, 1863–1963
- International Longshore and Warehouse Union (United States)
- Liverpool dockers' strike (1995–98) (UK)
- Mersey Docks and Harbour Company
- Mudlark
- National Union of Dock Labourers
- Scottish Union of Dock Labourers
- Teamster
- Weeks Marine
- 2024 United States port strike
