= Craig Safan =

American composer (born 1948)

- Born: December 17, 1948 (age 77); Los Angeles, California, United States
- Genres: Film score
- Occupation: Film composer

Craig Safan (born December 17, 1948, in Los Angeles, California) is an American composer for film and television, whose biggest scores include The Last Starfighter, Angel, Mr. Wrong, Stand and Deliver, Fade to Black, Major Payne, Remo Williams: The Adventure Begins, and music to the TV series Cheers, for which he won numerous ASCAP awards. His style consists of often improvising as a form of composition as a means to quickly express himself.

== Early life ==
Craig Safan was born in Los Angeles, son of L.A. native Eugene Safan, who owned a downtown jewelry store. Safan’s father was a B17 bomber pilot during World War II, and met his mother, Betty Torchin, in Laredo, Texas, while stationed there at the Army Air Force Base. She was a piano virtuoso who had studied at the Cleveland Conservatory.

Safan began picking out tunes when he was 5 or 6 years old. Growing tired of classical music, Safan’s mother hired a teacher for him named Helene Mirich Spear who taught "popular" piano, who had young Craig improvising in his first lesson. Besides being a jazz pianist, she also played classical violin, so as well as the improvisation, she worked on technique by having him play Scott Joplin and Zez Confrey pieces.

"While in middle school I was going to an LA club called Shelly's Mann Hole and hearing all the great jazz pianists... Thelonious Monk, Bill Evans, Hampton Hawes, and more," Safan recalled. Afterwards, Mirich would transcribe Monk's solos for him to play. "I was a very straight kid from a nice Jewish family whose idols were mostly junkies, but I didn't really understand that at the time."

After this experiential background in jazz, Safan found his way into classical music indirectly. "I never studied the classics," he said. "The first piece of classical music I ever studied was Stravinsky's The Rite of Spring and that was because I read about it in Leonard Bernstein's book The Joy of Music. So, my musical education has been sort of backwards – Joplin to Gershwin to jazz to Stravinsky."

At the age of 15, his family moved from Los Angeles to Beverly Hills, and Safan began attending Beverly Hills High. "It was a big transition," he recalled. "I knew no one and it was a very social, rich school. But I had music and art to save me."

Moving from jazz to rock and falling in love with the Rolling Stones and the Beatles, Safan joined a jazz quartet as well as a rock cover band. He had begun writing his own songs at the age of 13, and continued writing throughout high school. He also became interested in fine art and graphic design. "I was art editor of my high school yearbook and was probably the only high school kid with a subscription to Graphis Magazine," Safan said.

Safan never considered a profession in music, and was being pushed by his parents to become a doctor or lawyer. But he realized his ambition was to become some sort of artist. He enrolled at Brandeis University in Boston and became a Fine Arts major, thinking he would become an architect. But during those years he spent more and more time writing music, and he composed four original musicals while at Brandeis. And, since he knew pop music and could write music, he arranged several albums for Reprise Records. "I never went as far as becoming a music major, but I wrangled my way into the electronic music studio and spent untold hours playing with the setup there," Safan said. He also took a class in orchestration from experimental composer, Alvin Lucier. "He not only taught me how to write for all the conventional instruments, but how to listen and create sounds from everything around me, and how to be completely open as to what 'music' means," Safan recalled. "This became very important to me in scores such as Stand and Deliver where I created an entire percussion library from found objects and Wolfen, where I experimented with new composition techniques."

== Career ==
Upon his graduation in 1970, Safan was awarded both "Best Drama" and "Best Music" awards from Brandeis. More significantly, he was awarded a Watson Foundation Fellowship which allowed him to live in London for a year and write music. During that time, he mostly wrote pop songs and worked on musicals, his intentions still to become a songwriter.

But when his year in London ended, he returned to Los Angeles and then struggled to earn a living writing songs. Karla Bonoff sang one of them on her first album, and he arranged songs for artists like Dirk Hamilton, Rod Taylor, and Emmylou Harris while working part-time in his father’s jewelry store. During that period, he became friends with producer Charles Plotkin (he would later to produce Bruce Springsteen), who had built a small recording studio in Hollywood. With his brother Mark, Safan became part of Plotkin’s stable of young singer-songwriters. Also, in that group were Wendy Waldman (daughter of composer Fred Steiner), Andrew Gold (son of film composer Ernest Gold) and Peter Bernstein (son of Elmer Bernstein). Also, around the studio were Linda Ronstadt and Jennifer Warnes (who Craig played piano for). Safan also wrote songs with many other writers such as Amanda McBroom.

“One day, while dressed in suit and tie and selling jewelry on credit, I received a call from an old friend from Brandeis who had married a young film director,” Safan recalled. “They had just arrived in L.A. to attend the American Film Institute; he had made an independent Super 16mm horror film and they needed music for it.” Asked if he knew anyone who could do it, Safan suggested himself – and thus was born his career as a film composer at the age of 24. The film, never released, was called The Demon’s Daughter and the director was John McTiernan. “I was hooked and loved the freedom to put together all my talents, from the dramatic writing of theater, to the melodic and rhythmic world of songs, to the esoteric world of contemporary classical music. It just suddenly all came together at that moment.”

One assignment led to another. Writing the title music for California Reich, a 1975 documentary for Walter Parkes, led him to score a low-budget exploitation film called The Great Texas Dynamite Chase (1976), which began his long relationship with Michael Pressman, for whom he would score five more pictures through the 1990s. Meanwhile, he started studying film music and sought out the wisdom of Fred Steiner, Ernest Gold, and Elmer Bernstein. They, each in different ways, became his mentors.

He scored many independent action comedies like The Great Smokey Roadblock (1977), Acapulco Gold (1978), Corvette Summer (1978), Roller Boogie (1979). It came as a change of pace to score a dark thriller like Fade To Black (1980). Initially the music was to have been done by Chris Stein, guitarist for the rock band Blondie, but a contract had never been finalized for him to do so, so Safan was brought in late in the process to provide the film’s score instead. Fade To Black would launch Safan’s most active period in film scoring, the era in which he would be known for a number of large scale action, thriller, and science fiction films, including such films as Wolfen (1981); after recording, the score was excised from the production along with original director Michael Wadleigh and a new score was composed by James Horner), the jazzy and noirish comedic thriller, Tag: The Assassination Game (1982), the sweeping orchestral spectacle of The Last Starfighter (1984, one of Safan’s finest scores), the swashbuckling adventure of Remo Williams: The Adventure Begins (1985; Safan’s score mixed large orchestra with electronics and Korean instruments), a powerful electronic score from Synclavier for Warning Sign (1985), the Western science fiction TV-movie Timestalkers (1987), the purely electronic score for A Nightmare on Elm Street 4: The Dream Master (1988), the compelling and poignant music for Stand And Deliver (1988, also featuring Synclavier), and the sumptuous orchestral score for the 1991 TV Western docudrama about George Armstrong Custer, Son of the Morning Star (1991), and the effervescent, heartfelt, and occasionally zany scores for the popular comedies Major Payne (1995), Mr. Wrong (1996).

Safan has also composed extensively for television, notably the hit sitcom Cheers (1982–93), which won for him numerous ASCAP awards for his music. He also scored occasional episodes of the TV anthology shows, Amazing Stories (1985–86) and the revived The New Alfred Hitchcock Presents (1985) and The Twilight Zone (1985–86), Supercarrier (1988), the National Geographic Channel special Secrets of the Titanic (1986), and several fistfuls of made-for-TV movies in a number of genres, including Mission of the Shark: The Saga of the U.S.S. Indianapolis (1991), Terror on Track 9 (1992), and the Hallmark Hall of Fame film, A Season for Miracles (1999). All of these varied experiences precluded Safan’s being typecast in any one type of film. Safan’s style has often consisted of improvising as a form of composition that allowed him to quickly express himself to the visual story unfolding on the screen.[1]

In recent years Safan has returned to composing for theater, though he remains active in scoring for film and television. From 2005–10, he composed music to accompany some of the acts for the Ringling Bros. and Barnum & Bailey Circus.

In 2016, the Dallas Chamber Symphony commissioned an original film score for The Kid starring Charlie Chaplin. The score premiered during a concert screening on February 21, 2017 at Moody Performance Hall with Richard McKay conducting.

== Awards ==
Craig Safan won the ASCAP Film and Television Award for scoring a “Top TV Series” seven years in a row, 1988-1994, for Cheers. In 1991 he was nominated for an Emmy for Outstanding Achievement in Music and Lyrics for the TV series Life Goes On (1989), shared with Mark Mueller (lyricist). In 2014 he was presented with the Basil Poledouris award for a Film Music Legend at International Film Festival of the Province of Córdoba in Spain.

== Filmography ==
=== Film ===
Year	Title	Director	Notes
1975	The California Reich	Keith Crichlow; Walter F. Parkes	
1976	The Great Texas Dynamite Chase	Michael Pressman	
1977	The Bad News Bears in Breaking Training	Michael Pressman	
1977	The Great Smokey Roadblock	John Leone	
1978	Acapulco Gold	Burt Brinckerhoff	
1978	Good Guys Wear Black	Ted Post	
1978	Corvette Summer	Matthew Robbins	
1979	Roller Boogie	Mark L. Lester	
1980	Die Laughing	Jeff Werner	
1980	Fade to Black	Vernon Zimmerman	
1981	Wolfen	Michael Wadleigh	Replaced by James Horner
1981	Thief	Michael Mann	Main score composed and performed by Tangerine Dream. Safan contributed just the final musical track used in film called "Confrontation" which was only released on the USA version of the sound track recording.
1982	Tag: The Assassination Game	Nick Castle	
1983	Nightmares	Joseph Sargent	
1984	Angel	Robert Vincent O'Neill	
1984	The Last Starfighter	Nick Castle	
1985	The Legend of Billie Jean	Matthew Robbins	
1985	Warning Sign	Hal Barwood	
1985	Remo Williams: The Adventure Begins	Guy Hamilton	
1987	Lady Beware	Karen Arthur	
1987	The Stranger	Adolfo Aristarain	
1988	Stand and Deliver	Ramón Menéndez	
1988	A Nightmare on Elm Street 4: The Dream Master	Renny Harlin	with John Easdale Themes by Charles Bernstein
1990	Enid Is Sleeping	Maurice Phillips	
1992	Live Wire	Christian Duguay	
1993	Money for Nothing	Ramón Menéndez	
1995	Major Payne	Nick Castle	
1996	Mr. Wrong	Nick Castle	
1998	Slappy and the Stinkers	Barnet Kellman	
1999	Operation Splitsville	Lynn Hamrick	
2001	Delivering Milo	Nick Castle	
2002	Time of Fear	Alan Zwyer	

=== Television ===
Year	Title	Director	Notes
1978	Getting Married	Steven Hilliard Stern	Television movie
1979	Survival of Dana	Jack Starrett	Television movie
1982	Cheers	James Burrows; Glen Charles; Les Charles	Television sitcom
1985	Mirrors	Harry Winer	Television movie
1985	Amazing Stories	Steven Spielberg	Television series
1985	The New Alfred Hitchcock Presents		Television series
1986	Samaritan: The Mitch Snyder Story	Richard T. Heffron	Television movie
1986	The Twilight Zone		Television series
1986	Courage	Jeremy Kagan	Television movie
1987	Timestalkers	Michael Schultz	Television movie
1988	Shootdown	Michael Pressman	Television movie
1988	Supercarrier	William A. Graham	Television series
1989	The Comeback	Jerrold Freeman	Television movie
1989	The Revenge of Al Capone	Michael Pressman	Television movie
1991	Son of the Morning Star	Mike Robe	Television movie
1991	Long Road Home	John Korty	Television movie
1991	Mission of the Shark: The Saga of the U.S.S. Indianapolis	Robert Iscove	Television movie
1992	Breaking the Silence	Robert Iscove	Television movie
1992	Terror on Track 9	Robert Iscove	Television movie
1993	Judgment Day: The John List Story	Bobby Roth	Television movie
1993	Miracle Child	Michael Pressman	Television movie
1993	Prophet of Evil: The Ervil LeBaron Story	Jud Taylor	Television movie
1993	Rio Shannon	Mimi Leder	Television movie
1993	The Conviction of Kitty Dodds	Michael Tuchner	Television movie
1994	Where Are My Children?	George Kaczender	Television movie
1994	Without Consent	Robert Iscove	Television movie
1994	Without Warning	Robert Iscove	Television movie
Roseanne and Tom: Behind the Scenes	Richard A. Colla		Television movie
1995	Degree of Guilt	Mike Robe	Television movie
1996	A Different Kind of Christmas	Tom McLoughlin	Television movie
1998	When Husbands Cheat	Richard A. Colla	Television movie
1999	A Season for Miracles	Michael Pressman	Television movie
2000	The New Adventures of Spin and Marty: Suspect Behavior	Rusty Cundieff	Television movie
2001	The Familiar Stranger	Alan Metzger	Television movie
2001	'Twas the Night	Nick Castle	Television movie
2002	Gotta Kick It Up!	Ramón Menéndez	

=== Video games ===
- Leisure Suit Larry 5: Passionate Patti Does a Little Undercover Work (1991)

=== Other works ===
- Ringling Bros. and Barnum & Bailey Circus (131st Edition, 134th Edition, Circus of Dreams/136th Edition, Over the Top/138th Edition, Fully Charged/141st Edition)
- Rough Magic: Music Inspired by the Paleolithic Cave Paintings of Europe (2005) (original composition)
- Sirens: Music Inspired by Homer's Odyssey (2018) (original composition)

== Discography ==
- Lady Beware (Intercord CD, 1987)
- A Nightmare on Elm Street 4: The Dream Master (Varese Sarabande LP & CD, 1988)
- Stand And Deliver (Varese Sarabande CD, 1988)
- The Last Starfighter (Southern Cross LP, 1984; Intrada CD, 1995; Intrada complete score CD, 2015)
- Son of the Morning Star (Intrada CD, 1992)
- Angel (Intrada CD, 1993)
- Money for Nothing (Miles End promotional CD, 1993)
- Major Payne (Miles End promotional CD, 1995)
- Mr. Wrong (Miles End promotional CD, 1996)
- “Music of Craig Safan” (Miles End promotional CD compilation, 1999)
- Remo Williams: The Adventure Begins (Perseverance Records CD, 2006; Intrada CD, 2011)
- Fade to Black (Perseverance Records promotional CD, 2009)
- Wolfen (unused score; Intrada CD, 2011)
- Tag: The Assassination Game (BSX Records, 2012)
- Circus! (Perseverance Records CD, 2012)
- Rough Magic: Music Inspired by Paleolithic Cave Paintings (Perseverance Records CD, 2015)
- Sirens: Music Inspired by Homer's Odyssey (Varese Sarabande Records CD, 2018)
