= Joey Coyle =

American longshoreman (1953–1993)

- Born: Joseph William Coyle; February 26, 1953; Philadelphia, Pennsylvania, United States
- Died: August 15, 1993 (aged 40); Philadelphia, Pennsylvania, United States
- Occupation: Longshoreman

Joseph William Coyle (February 26, 1953 – August 15, 1993) was an unemployed longshoreman in Philadelphia who, in February 1981, found $1.2 million in the street, after it had fallen out of the back of an armored car, and kept it. His story was made into the 1993 film Money for Nothing, starring John Cusack, as well as a 2002 book by Mark Bowden, Finders Keepers: The Story of a Man Who Found $1 Million.

== Discovery of the money ==
On February 26, 1981 in Philadelphia, Pennsylvania, Joey Coyle, an unemployed longshoreman, had been travelling with his friends and co-workers John Behlau and Jed Pennock, when he discovered two canvas bags on the side of a road, roughly one block from Purolator Armored Services. Both bags had been picked up from the Federal Reserve Bank of Philadelphia, and contained $1.2 million in $100 bills. They had fallen from one of Purolator's armored vans, on the Swanson and Porter Streets in South Philadelphia after the driver hit a speed bump. That night, Philadelphia Police Detective Pat Laurenzi began a neighborhood search after two eyewitnesses reported the make and model of the vehicle that Behlau was driving, a 1971 Chevrolet Malibu, and a person with their hands full entering the vehicle before it drove off. The FBI was later brought in to aid the investigation.

Coyle gave away portions of the cash to family, friends and strangers, in addition to supporting his drug addiction to methamphetamines. He later met with another friend, Carl Masi, who learned from a radio scanner that police had issued a search for Belhau's car. After abandoning the vehicle in Gloucester City, New Jersey, Masi warned Coyle to turn the money in to police. Coyle refused, and days later he allegedly met with Mario Riccobene, a member of the Philadelphia crime family who was to instruct him on how to properly handle the money. Coyle gave Riccobene $400,000, hoping the latter would have the $100 bills laundered down to smaller denominations by playing at a Las Vegas casino. After more than 500 tips from eyewitnesses, Laurenzi received a police report of Behlau's car in Gloucester City. Belhau and Pennock later turned themselves in to the police, both revealing how Coyle found the money, as well as his interactions with Masi.

Coyle decided to leave town in fear of being caught by police or hunted by other mobsters. He turned to his friend Francis A. Santos, who bought him a plane ticket and spent the night with him in New York City. On March 3, 1981, both men were arrested by FBI agents at the John F. Kennedy International Airport. At the time of his arrest, Coyle was attempting to check in for a flight to Acapulco, Mexico. He was carrying $105,000 in 21 envelopes (each containing $5,000) that were stuffed inside a pair of cowboy boots he was wearing. Roughly $1,003,400 of the missing money was recovered; the remainder was never found. Belhau, Pennock and Masi were not charged.

=== Aftermath ===
Coyle was charged with theft, conspiracy, receiving stolen property and Unlawful Flight to Avoid Prosecution with a maximum sentence of seven years. Santos received an accessory charge that was ultimately dropped. During trial, Coyle's lawyer Harold Kane argued that his client's actions upon discovering the money were motivated by insanity and not greed. On March 5, 1982, a jury found Coyle innocent by reason of temporary insanity.

In April 1983, Coyle filed a lawsuit against Purolator, claiming that the company's negligence in not properly securing the money was the cause of his insanity. The suit, filed at a Philadelphia Common Pleas Court, asked for $20,000 in damages. The following June, a federal judge dismissed the case, ruling that Coyle's mental injuries were caused by his own "weak" character.

In 1986, journalist Mark Bowden interviewed Coyle, as well as family and friends closest to him about their experiences. His article "Finders Keepers" was published as a three-part serial for The Philadelphia Inquirer in December 1986. Bowden later adapted the article into a 2002 book titled Finders Keepers: The Story of a Man who Found $1 Million.

== Death ==
For much of his adult life, Coyle struggled with drug addiction, and had become despondent over the death of his mother in 1981. On August 15, 1993, Coyle was found dead from an apparent suicide by hanging in his South Philadelphia home.
