= Ulysses Cuadra =

American actor

- Born: Ulysses Cuadra Jr. February 24, 1987 (age 39); Los Angeles, California, U.S.
- Occupation: Actor
- Years active: 1997–2012; 2024

Ulysses Cuadra Jr. (born February 24, 1987) is an American actor, involved in cinema, television, and animation. He was the voice of Maurice "Twister" Rodriguez on the Nickelodeon animated series Rocket Power.

== Career ==
Cuadra started acting in 1997, at the age of 10. He was the voice of Vaz on Clifford the Big Red Dog, and played Segura on the Disney Channel film Gotta Kick It Up!. Cuadra has also starred in numerous films, including The End of Violence, Price of Glory, and Tortilla Soup.

He voiced the character of Maurice "Twister" Rodriguez in Nickelodeon's animated series Rocket Power for three seasons; he was replaced by Gilbert Leal in the fourth season. Cuadra reprised the role in the television film Rocket Power: Race Across New Zealand and the video games Rocket Power: Team Rocket Rescue, Rocket Power: Extreme Arcade Games, and Rocket Power: Beach Bandits.

== Filmography ==
=== Film ===
Year	Film	Role	Notes
1997	The End of Violence	Jose	
1999	Learning to Swim	Young Guillermo	Short
2000	Tortilla Soup	Snide student	

=== Television ===
Year	Television	Role	Notes
1997	ER	Jaime Landeta	Episode: "When the Bough Breaks"
1997	Foto Novelas: Mangas	Octavio	Television film
1998	The Pretender	Kid	Episode: "Betrayal"
1999	Beverly Hills, 90210	Miguel Alvarez	Episode: "The Loo-Ouch"
1999–2004	Rocket Power	Maurice "Twister" Rodriguez, Sam "Squid" Dullard (pilot)	Voice, 60 episodes
2000	Cover Me	Jesus	Episode: "Our Mr. Brooks"
2000	Runaway Virus	Marco	Television film
2000	Max Steel	Additional voices	Episode: "Amazon"
2001	Judging Amy	Duncan	Episode: "Rights of Passage"
2001	The Zeta Project	Bucky Buenaventura	Voice, 3 episodes
2001	The Mummy	Pilow	Voice, episode: "The Cloud People"
2000–2002	Clifford the Big Red Dog	Vaz	Voice, 19 episodes
2002	Gotta Kick It Up!	Segura	Television film
2002	Rocket Power: Race Across New Zealand	Maurice "Twister" Rodriguez	Voice, television film
2008	Numb3rs	Robber #2	Episode: "Frienemies"
2010	Law & Order: LA	Teenager #1	Episode: "Ballona Creek"; credited as Ulysees Cuadra
2012	CSI: NY	Anthony James	Episode: "Unwrapped"

=== Video games ===
Year	Title	Role	Notes
2001	Rocket Power: Team Rocket Rescue	Maurice "Twister" Rodriguez	
2001	Rocket Power: Extreme Arcade Games	Maurice "Twister" Rodriguez	
2002	Rocket Power: Beach Bandits	Maurice "Twister" Rodriguez	
2005	SOCOM U.S. Navy SEALs: Fireteam Bravo	Eusebio Vargas	
2009	Resident Evil: The Darkside Chronicles	Javier Hidalgo	
2011	Resident Evil: The Mercenaries 3D	Additional voices	
2024	Final Fantasy XIV: Dawntrail	Gulool Ja Ja	
