= Pursuit (2022 film) =

2022 American film by Brian Skiba

- Official release poster
- Directed by: Brian Skiba
- Written by: Brian Skiba; Andrew Stevens; Dawn Bursteen; Ben Fiore
- Produced by: Andrew Stevens
- Starring: Emile Hirsch; John Cusack
- Edited by: Brady Hallongren
- Music by: Richard Patrick; David Wurst; Eric Wurst
- Production companies: Andrew Stevens Entertainment; Cartouche; Grindstone Entertainment; Milestone Studios
- Distributed by: Lionsgate Home Entertainment
- Release date: February 18, 2022
- Running time: 97 minutes
- Country: United States
- Language: English
- Box office: $13,420

Pursuit is a 2022 American action film directed by Brian Skiba and starring Emile Hirsch and John Cusack.

The film was released direct to video on February 18, 2022, by Lionsgate Home Entertainment.

== Synopsis ==
Detective Mike Breslin crosses paths with Rick Calloway, a ruthless hacker who's trying to save his kidnapped wife from a drug cartel. When Calloway escapes from police custody, Breslin joins forces with a no-nonsense cop to reclaim his prisoner.

== Cast ==
- Emile Hirsch as Rick "Thanatos" Calloway
- John Cusack as John Calloway
- Jake Manley as Detective Mike Breslin
- William Katt as Taye Biggs

== Production ==
Principal photography took place in Little Rock, Arkansas in July 2021. Filming has wrapped as of November 2021.

== Release ==
Pursuit was released direct to video on February 18, 2022, by Lionsgate Home Entertainment.

=== Critical reception ===
The film has a 8% rating on Rotten Tomatoes based on 12 reviews, with an average score of 2.5/10.

Julian Roman of MovieWeb gave the film a positive review and wrote, "Pursuit is a bloody and twisted pulp actioner with an insane body count.(...) The film has a spectacularly convoluted plot but keeps the adrenaline pumping with gritty action scenes."

Lisa Kennedy of The New York Times gave the film a mixed review and wrote, "In a previous era, this action thriller, directed by Brian Skiba, would have gone from postproduction directly into a bargain bin at a rundown video emporium on a dark alley where rats scurried."

=== Box office ===
As of April 7, 2024, Pursuit grossed $13,420 in the United Arab Emirates.
