= Singularity (2017 film) =

2017 film by Robert Kouba

- Directed by: Robert Kouba
- Written by: Robert Kouba; Sebastian Cepeda
- Produced by: Robert Kouba; Sebastian Cepeda
- Starring: John Cusack; Carmen Argenziano; Julian Schaffner; Jeannine Wacker
- Cinematography: Sebastian Cepeda; Jesse Brunt
- Edited by: Robert Kouba; Kyle Tekiela
- Music by: Scott Kirkland; Tobias Enhus
- Production companies: Voltage Pictures; Vantis Pictures; Calanda Pictures
- Distributed by: Vertical Entertainment
- Release date: November 3, 2017
- Running time: 92 minutes
- Country: Switzerland / United States
- Language: English
- Budget: $100,000
- Box office: $86,822

Singularity is a Swiss/American science fiction film. It was written and directed by Robert Kouba, and its first shoot, in 2013, starred Julian Schaffner, Jeannine Wacker and Carmen Argenziano. The film was first released in 2017, after further scenes with John Cusack were added.

== Plot ==
In 2020, robotics company CEO Elias VanDorne reveals Kronos, a supercomputer he has invented to end all wars. Kronos determines that mankind is responsible for all wars and attempts to use robots to kill all humans. VanDorne, along with his colleague Damien Walsh, uploads themselves into Kronos and witnesses the ensuing destruction. Ninety-seven years later, Andrew, a kind-hearted young man, awakens in a ruined world. VanDorne and Walsh, still within Kronos, observe as Andrew meets Calia, a teenage girl searching for the last human settlement, known as the Aurora. Initially, Calia is reluctant to allow Andrew to accompany her, still shaken by a drone attack that left her parents gone and her sister fatally wounded. However, the two eventually fall in love. Unbeknownst to them, VanDorne and Walsh are monitoring the pair, hoping they will lead them to the Aurora.

During their travels, they encounter a pack of marauders who manage to capture Andrew, forcing Calia to abandon him. She later returns in an attempt to rescue him. When Calia is attacked and sexually harassed by some of the marauders, Andrew instinctively demonstrates superhuman strength and resilience, effortlessly defeating the thugs. He survives an attack from their leader, who is fatally stabbed by Calia. Calia discovers machinery embedded in one of Andrew's wounds, which distresses her, leading her to abandon him. They are then captured and brought before Walsh, who reveals that Andrew, the first in a new generation of machines, was designed to exterminate any remaining humans. Andrew, the machine, possesses the memories of his long-dead eponym, which Walsh makes him sift through for clues about Aurora's location. Instead, Andrew envisions his mother, Veronica, who reminds him that he is still her loving son. This connection helps Andrew the machine identify with his human self. He overrides Walsh's programming and escapes with Calia.

Andrew and Calia spot the lights of what they believe to be Aurora, only to discover an empty city. Walsh concludes that Aurora was a myth after all and orders his robot drones to kill them and any remaining humans, having kept a few scavengers and marauders alive solely to track them to Aurora. As the robots begin carpet-bombing the last survivors, Andrew and Calia flee underground, eventually finding a high-tech room. Responding to the presence of a human, the room reveals itself as the control room of a spaceship, which sets a course for Aurora—a distant planet rather than an Earth-based settlement. With Kronos's bombs approaching, Andrew and Calia activate the ship's hyperdrive to escape, despite the risk that upon reaching Aurora, the humans there might destroy Andrew due to his robotic nature.

Now possessing the location of Aurora, VanDorne betrays and kills Walsh. Andrew and Calia arrive at Aurora, which turns out to be a lush planet with futuristic cities. In a voiceover, Calia proclaims that Kronos will come after Aurora, but with Andrew—a machine that may be more human than anyone else—they stand a chance. As a massive fleet launches towards Aurora, VanDorne declares that the last of humanity will face their fate once he reaches the planet.

== Cast ==
- Julian Schaffner as Andrew Davis
- John Cusack as Elias VanDorne
- Jeannine Michèle Wacker as Calia
- Carmen Argenziano as Damien Walsh
- Eileen Grubba as Veronica Davis, Andrew's mother.
- Ego Nwodim as Assistant

== Production ==
Singularity began as a low-budget sci-fi film called Aurora, which was shot in 2013 in the Czech Republic and Switzerland. John Cusack was not involved in the original shoot. Years later, scenes with Cusack interacting only with Argenziano were shot and inserted into the new production, and extensive CGI effects were used to tie the new material to the original film.

== Reception ==
Jason Pirodsky from The Prague Reporter gave a negative review, criticizing production values, continuity errors, and the film's "thoroughly unconvincing narrative", adding that 80% of it consisted of "Wacker and Schaffner aimlessly walking around Czech forests in search for Aurora, the fabled last outpost of humanity that they don’t really know anything about". Pirodsky also criticized the addition of Cusack, noting that he only interacts with one other character as his performance was shot years after the majority of scenes were filmed.
