= Stand and Deliver =

1988 biographical comedy-drama film

- Theatrical release poster
- Directed by: Ramón Menéndez
- Written by: Ramón Menéndez; Tom Musca
- Produced by: Tom Musca
- Starring: Edward James Olmos; Lou Diamond Phillips; Rosanna DeSoto; Andy García
- Cinematography: Tom Richmond
- Edited by: Nancy Richardson
- Music by: Craig Safan
- Production company: American Playhouse
- Distributed by: Warner Bros. Pictures
- Release dates: February 13, 1988 (Miami); March 11, 1988 (United States)
- Running time: 102 minutes
- Country: United States
- Language: English
- Budget: $1.6 million
- Box office: $14 million

Stand and Deliver is a 1988 American biographical comedy-drama film directed by Ramón Menéndez, written by Menéndez and Tom Musca and produced by Musca. It is based on the true story of Garfield High School mathematics teacher Jaime Escalante, who inspired 18 Latino students to pass Advanced Placement Calculus in 1982. The film's title refers to Mr. Mister's 1987 song "Stand and Deliver", which is also featured in the film's ending credits.

For portraying Escalante, Edward James Olmos was nominated for the Academy Award for Best Actor at the 61st Academy Awards. The film won the Independent Spirit Award for Best Feature in 1988. In 2011, the film was selected for preservation in the United States National Film Registry by the Library of Congress as being "culturally, historically, or aesthetically significant".

== Plot ==
In the early 1980s, Jaime Escalante becomes a mathematics teacher at James A. Garfield High School in East Los Angeles. Latino students from working-class families have academic achievement far below their grade level. Students Angel and another gangster arrive late and question Escalante's authority. Escalante demonstrates how to multiply numbers using one's fingers and appeals to the students' sense of humor. After class, some gangsters threaten him. After school, he stops the gangsters from fighting. Escalante decides to teach the students algebra.

At a meeting, he learns that the school's accreditation is under threat, as test scores are not high enough. He says that students will rise to the level that is expected of them and gives the students a quiz every morning. He instructs his class under the philosophy of ganas. (Note: Ganas roughly translates to "desire") Escalante tells other faculty that he wants to teach the students calculus, seeking to change the school culture to help the students excel in academics. Other teachers ridicule him, as the students have not taken the prerequisites. Escalante states that the students can take the prerequisites over the summer, setting a goal of having the students take Advanced Placement Calculus by their senior year.

The students sign up for the prerequisites over the summer. In the fall, he gives them contracts to be signed by the parents; they must come in on Saturdays, show up an hour early to school, and stay until 5pm in order to prepare for the AP Calculus exam. Two weeks before the exam, Escalante teaches an ESL class when he suddenly clutches at his torso in pain, stumbles into the hallway, and falls. Escalante escapes from the hospital and shows up at school to continue teaching.

After taking the AP calculus exam, the students head to the beach and celebrate. All 18 students who took the exam pass it. At a meeting to congratulate them, a plaque of appreciation is presented to Escalante.

To the dismay of Escalante and the students, the Educational Testing Service (ETS) questions the students' exam scores. Escalante finds an anonymous letter of resignation in his school mail and walks home that evening, as his car has been stolen. Dismayed, he confides in his wife that he regrets having taught calculus because the students did well but nothing changed. Fabiola reassures him, stating that his students appreciate his efforts. Outside, students surprise him by fixing his car. Escalante meets with the investigators from ETS and offers to have the students retake the test. Despite having only one day to prepare, all the students pass, and Escalante demands that the original scores be reinstated.

End captions indicate that in the summer of 1982, Escalante's entire class passed AP Calculus and in subsequent years, his program became even more successful.

== Cast ==
- Edward James Olmos as Jaime Escalante
- Estelle Harris as Estelle, the School Secretary
- Virginia Paris as Raquel Ortega
- Will Gotay as Francisco "Pancho" Garcia
- Ingrid Oliu as Guadalupe "Lupe" Escobar
- Carmen Argenziano as Jesse Molina
- Rosanna DeSoto as Fabiola Escalante
- Vanessa Marquez as Ana Delgado
- Lou Diamond Phillips as Angel Guzman
- Karla Montana as Claudia Camejo
- Lydia Nicole as Rafaela Fuentes
- James Victor as Ana's Father
- Mark Eliot as Armando "Tito" Guitaro
- Patrick Baca as Javier Perales
- Andy García as Ramirez
- Rif Hutton as Pearson
- Daniel Villarreal as Chuco

== Production ==
=== Preproduction ===
In 1984, Ramón Menéndez, a recent UCLA film school graduate, discovered Jaime Escalante's story through a Los Angeles Times article about the controversial re-testing of his calculus students. Menéndez collaborated with fellow UCLA alumnus Tom Musca to co-write the screenplay. Securing the film rights required six months of persuasion, culminating in Escalante agreeing to the project for a nominal fee of one dollar. Initial attempts to secure funding from independent studios were unsuccessful, as the subject matter was deemed commercially unviable. However, the project gained traction through a $12,000 grant from PBS' American Playhouse anthology series. Additional financial support was provided by the National Science Foundation, the Atlantic Richfield Company, and the Corporation for Public Broadcasting. The role of Escalante was originally offered to Raul Julia, who turned it down but later had a change of heart. By that time however, Menéndez and Musca had offered the part to Edward James Olmos, then known for his role in Miami Vice. He joined the project, contributing his production company to the film's development.

The film had a modest budget of approximately $800,000, a sum raised by Musca knocking on closed doors and eventually getting a L.A. based oil company to step up to the plate. Olmos attributed the film's eventual realization to a concerted grassroots effort and described the project as a "miracle" given the climate for Latino-themed films in Hollywood at the time. Escalante reportedly recounted his real-life classroom interactions in detail. A number of the film's most quoted lines such as "You burros have math in your blood", were lifted directly from Escalante's classroom.

=== Casting ===
Olmos was cast as Jaime Escalante, a role for which he conducted extensive research, including shadowing Escalante for 18 hours a day and residing in his home to authentically capture his mannerisms and teaching style, as well as gaining 40 pounds and thinning his hair. Menéndez and Musca's casting process had a focus on Latino and Chicano actors, many of whom were newcomers, to accurately represent the student body of Garfield High School.

For the role of Angel, Olmos recommended Lou Diamond Phillips based on their previous work together. Phillips prepared for the role with the help of production assistant Daniel Villareal, who was later cast as Angel's friend, Chuco. Phillips won the Independent Spirit Award for Best Supporting Male and was nominated for the Golden Globe Award for Best Supporting Actor – Motion Picture.

Actor James Victor, who played Ana's father, sued the film's producers for $3 million, citing breach of contract and failure to provide front-end credits. His request for an injunction against the film's release was denied by a Superior Court judge.

=== Filming ===
Principal photography occurred on location in East Los Angeles, primarily at Garfield High School, Escalante's actual workplace. Additional scenes were filmed at Roosevelt High School and various locales across Boyle Heights, City Terrace, Aliso Village, and East L.A. Notable sites included the Bob Hope Patriotic Hall in downtown Los Angeles for the Educational Testing Service (ETS) confrontation scene, Baldwin Hills for the Escalante family home, and Will Rogers State Beach in Pacific Palisades for the post-exam celebration. A night scene of Angel and his grandmother that was cut during the early days of production was hastily added back to the shooting schedule in the final week of shooting. Needing a location on the fly, Musca found an impoverished family willing to vacate their modest apartment and paid them money to sleep in a motel. Nevertheless, a few hours into shooting, the crew heard suspicious noises and when Musca opened a closet door, he realized the family instead had pocketed the money and was sitting shoulder to shoulder, shoehorned into the closet. No strangers to irony, Musca and Menendez invited the family to observe the filmmaking on set and eat with the crew.

=== Postproduction and music ===
The film was edited by Nancy Richardson, marking her debut in feature film editing. Craig Safan composed the film's score, integrating contemporary 1980s synthesizer elements with traditional orchestration to reflect the film's modern yet timeless themes. The title "Stand and Deliver" was inspired by Mr. Mister's 1987 song "Stand and Deliver", which is featured in the film's ending credits. Menendez and Musca changed the title of the film from "Walking on Water" to "Stand and Deliver" when Warner Bros. informed them that they planned to release the film Easter week.

In the lead-up to the film's release, Olmos organized community screenings, participated in interviews, and distributed free tickets. Olmos credited "strong word-of-mouth support" as a key factor in the film's box office performance.

After screening at the Mill Valley Film Festival, Stand and Deliver attracted interest from multiple major studios. Warner Bros. Pictures acquired worldwide distribution rights for a reported $3.5 to $5 million. A benefit premiere was held on February 26, 1988, at Mann's Chinese Theater in Hollywood, with proceeds benefiting the Jaime Escalante Calculus Program and the Garfield High School Alumni Association Scholarship Fund.

The film opened in Los Angeles on March 11, 1988, on thirty screens, grossing $411,884 and earning a per-screen average of $13,729. It expanded to New York on March 18 and widened to 750 screens nationally by April 15, 1988. Stand and Deliver ultimately grossed nearly $14 million—a substantial figure for a low-budget Latino film at the time, and notably more than many comparable releases even decades later.

== Reception ==
=== Critical response ===
On the review aggregator website Rotten Tomatoes, the movie holds a score of 89% from 63 reviews. The website's consensus reads, "Stand and Deliver pulls off the unlikely feat of making math class the stuff of underdog drama – and pays rousing tribute to a real-life inspirational figure in the bargain." Metacritic has given the film a score of 77 out of 100 based on 11 reviews, indicating "generally favorable reviews".

The film received largely positive reviews. The Hollywood Reporter called it a "gutty little underdog film", highlighting the performances of Edward James Olmos, Lou Diamond Phillips, and Will Gotay. Film critic Roger Ebert gave Stand and Deliver a mixed but generally favorable review, praising its inspirational story and Olmos' performance, while also critiquing aspects of its screenplay and dramatic structure, noting that while parts of the film "moved [him] very deeply", others felt "artificial and contrived".

=== Accolades ===
Award	Category	Recipient(s) in	Result	Ref(s)
Academy Awards	Best Actor	Edward James Olmos	Nominated	
Golden Globe Awards	Best Actor – Motion Picture Drama	Edward James Olmos	Nominated	
Golden Globe Awards	Best Supporting Actor – Motion Picture	Lou Diamond Phillips	Nominated	
Independent Spirit Awards	Best Feature	Tom Musca	Won	
Independent Spirit Awards	Best Director	Ramón Menéndez	Won	
Independent Spirit Awards	Best Male Lead	Edward James Olmos	Won	
Independent Spirit Awards	Best Supporting Male	Lou Diamond Phillips	Won	
Independent Spirit Awards	Best Supporting Female	Rosanna DeSoto	Won	
Independent Spirit Awards	Best Screenplay	Ramón Menéndez; Tom Musca	Won	
Independent Spirit Awards	Best Cinematography	Tom Richmond	Nominated	
Young Artist Awards	Michael Landon Award	Youth Ensemble	Won	
Young Artist Awards	Young Artist Award for Best Family Motion Picture - Drama	Tom Musca	Nominated	

== Historical accuracy ==
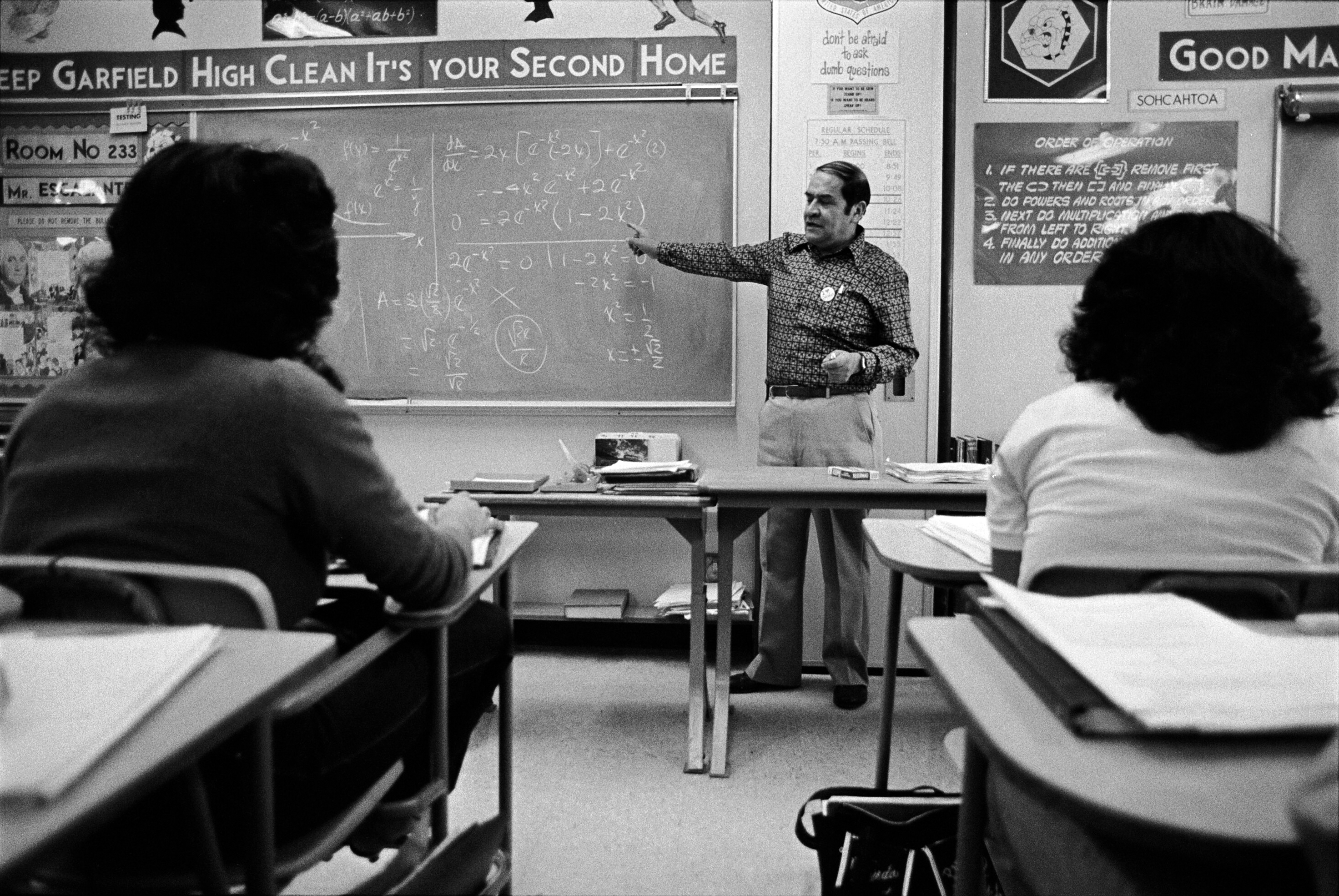
Jaime Escalante teaches a class at Garfield High School in Los Angeles, 1983

The film accurately portrays that students had to retake the AP exam, and that all who retook it passed. The movie gives the impression that the incident occurred in the year Escalante was teaching, after students from his first year took a summer session for the calculus prerequisites. In fact, Escalante first began teaching at Garfield High School in 1974 and taught his first Advanced Placement Calculus course in 1978 with a group of 14 students, and it was in 1982 that the exam incident occurred. In the first year (1978), only five students remained in the course at the end of the year, only two of whom passed the AP Calculus exam. Writing in Reason, Jerry Jesness stated, "Unlike the students in the movie, the real Garfield students required years of solid preparation before they could take calculus. So Escalante established a program at East Los Angeles College where students could take those classes in intensive seven-week summer sessions. Escalante and [principal Henry] Gradillas were also instrumental in getting the feeder schools to offer algebra in the eighth and ninth grades." In 1987, 27 percent of all Mexican Americans who scored three or higher on the AP Calculus exam were students at Garfield High.

Escalante described the film as "90 percent truth, 10 percent drama". He said that several points were left out of the film. He pointed out that no student who did not know multiplication tables or fractions was ever taught calculus in a single year. Also, he suffered inflammation of the gall bladder, not a heart attack.

Ten of the 1982 students signed waivers to allow the College Board to show their exams to Jay Mathews, the author of Escalante: The Best Teacher in America. Mathews found that nine of them had made "identical silly mistakes" on free response question six. Mathews heard from two of the students that during the exam, a piece of paper had been passed around with that flawed solution. Twelve students, including the nine with the identical mistakes, retook the exam, and most of them received the top scores of four and five. Mathews concluded that nine of the students did cheat, but they knew the material and did not need to.

Mathews wrote in the Los Angeles Times that the Ana Delgado character "was the only teenage character in the film based on a real person" and that her name had been changed.

== Analysis ==
External videos
- Excellence in Education, C-SPAN

=== Context ===
The film was released during a period of heightened attention to the Latino filmgoing demographic, spurred in part by the box office success of films such as La Bamba and Born in East L.A.. Hollywood executives, recognizing the purchasing power of Latino audiences—estimated at $180 billion in the 1980s—began exploring Latino-centered stories and bilingual marketing strategies.

Despite this momentary enthusiasm, Olmos lamented the continued difficulty in securing funding for Latino-led films, both at the time of Stand and Deliver and 25 years later. He argued that mainstream studios had little incentive to invest in Latino narratives because Latino audiences already supported general market blockbusters in large numbers.

== Legacy ==
President Ronald Reagan delivers remarks on Stand and Deliver in the East Room, 1988

Following the success of the film, Garfield High School reported a noticeable drop in AP Calculus scores in 1988, which school officials attributed to Escalante being distracted by film promotion and high-profile visitors, including then–Vice President George H. W. Bush.

The film aired on public television station KCET on March 15, 1989, during a pledge drive, becoming the station's second highest-rated broadcast ever at that time and raising over $162,000.

Olmos emphasized the film's long-standing role in educational settings, noting its frequent use in U.S. high schools where many students view it multiple times before graduation. He attributed the film's enduring popularity to its inspirational message and universal themes. He also described Stand and Deliver as the most significant and impactful project of his career. The role earned him nominations for both an Academy Award for Best Actor (making him the first American-born Latino to receive that honor) and a Golden Globe Award for Best Performance by an Actor in a Motion Picture - Drama. Additionally, he would go on to win the Independent Spirit Award for Best Male Lead. Olmos stated that the performance was essentially an impersonation of Escalante, and recounted that Escalante himself was present on set during filming.

Remarks on Signing the National Hispanic Heritage Week Proclamation in the Rose Garden

The film is recognized by the American Film Institute as #86 on its 2006 AFI's 100 Years...100 Cheers list.

In December 2011, Stand and Deliver was deemed "culturally, historically, or aesthetically significant" by the United States Library of Congress and selected for preservation in the National Film Registry. The Registry said the film was "one of the most popular of a new wave of narrative feature films produced in the 1980s by Latino filmmakers" and that it "celebrates in a direct, approachable, and impactful way, values of self-betterment through hard work and power through knowledge."

In 2013, Rand Paul was accused of—and subsequently admitted to—plagiarizing the Wikipedia page of the movie in one of his speeches.

In 2016, the United States Postal Service issued a 1st Class Forever "Jaime Escalante" stamp to honor "the East Los Angeles teacher whose inspirational methods led supposedly 'unteachable' high school students to master calculus." That year, the U.S. Embassy in Bolivia sponsored a screening of Stand and Deliver at Cinemateca Boliviana on September 7.

== See also ==
- 1988 in film
- AFI's 100 Years... 100 Cheers
- List of American films of 1988
- List of films about mathematicians
- List of hood films
- Mathematics education in the United States
