= Ramón Menéndez =

Film director, screenwriter

- Born: January 25, 1949 (age 77); Cuba
- Education: San Francisco State University; UCLA School of Theater, Film and Television
- Occupations: Film director, screenwriter
- Years active: 1981–2002

Ramón Menéndez (born January 21, 1950) is a Cuban-American film director and screenwriter. He is best known for writing and directing the 1988 film Stand and Deliver.

His other film directing credits include Money for Nothing (1993) starring John Cusack and the Disney Channel original film Gotta Kick It Up! (2002). He also served as a screenwriter for all of the films he directed. His only film as a screenwriter and not as a director was the 2001 film Tortilla Soup.

He has also worked in episodic television, directing episodes Tales from the Crypt and Perversions of Science, in 1994 and 1997, respectively.

Menéndez won two Independent Spirit Awards for his work on Stand and Deliver.

Menéndez is a native of Cuba and grew up in California. He is an alumnus of San Francisco State University and UCLA Film School. His first credit in film industry was serving as an assistant director on the Oliver Stone-directed film Salvador (1986), he also had a small acting role in the film.

He is a frequent collaborator with film producer Tom Musca.

== Filmography ==
- Madame X (1981, actor, as Luis)
- Salvador (1986, first assistant director, also actor as Gomez)
- Life Is Most Important (1987, actor, as Gregorio)
- Stand and Deliver (1988, director and screenwriter)
- Money for Nothing (1993, director and screenwriter)
- Tales from the Crypt (1994, director, episode: "The Bribe")
- Perversions of Science (1997, director, episode: "Given the Heir")
- Tortilla Soup (2001, screenwriter)
- Gotta Kick It Up! (2002, director, teleplay writer)
