= Gotta Kick It Up! =

- Promotional advertisement
- Teleplay by: Nancy De Los Stantos; Ramón Menéndez; Tom Musca; Stu Krieger
- Story by: Meghan Cole; Nancy De Los Santos
- Directed by: Ramón Menéndez
- Starring: Camille Guaty; America Ferrera; Susan Egan; Jhoanna Flores; Suilma Rodriguez; Sabrina Wiener
- Theme music composer: Craig Safan
- Country of origin: United States
- Original language: English

Production
- Producer: Christopher Morgan
- Cinematography: Clark Mathis
- Editor: Nancy Richardson
- Running time: 78 minutes

Original release
- Network: Disney Channel
- Release: July 26, 2002

Gotta Kick It Up! is a 2002 American sports comedy-drama film released as a Disney Channel Original Movie. In the United States, it debuted on July 26, 2002. It is based on a true story of a middle school dance team. The film was directed by Ramón Menéndez.

== Plot ==
A young executive turned teacher helps a group of young Latina girls find themselves and overcome societal obstacles through their dance troupe.

== Cast ==
- Camille Guaty as Daisy Salinas
- America Ferrera as Yolanda "Yoli" Vargas
- Jhoanna Flores as Alyssa Cortez
- Suilma Rodriguez as Marisol
- Sabrina Wiener as Esmeralda Reyna
- Miguel Sandoval as Principal Zavala
- Erik Alexander Gavica as "Chuy"
- Susan Egan as Heather Bartlett
- Elizabeth Sung as Ms. Kim
- Gina Gallego as Mrs. Cortez
- Gerry Del Sol as Mr. Cortez
- Valente Rodriguez as Mr. Reyna
- Anita Ortega as Mrs. Reyna
- Yvonne Farrow as Lynell Elliott
- Ulises Cuadra as Segura
