= ALMA Award =

Awards ceremony for Latino Americans

ALMA Awards
- Awarded for: Excellence in film, television, and music by Latino Americans
- Country: United States
- Presented by: UnidosUS
- Formerly called: Bravo Awards
- First award: 1987; 39 years ago
- Final award: November 4, 2018; 8 years ago
- Website: almaawards.com

Television/radio coverage
- Network: Univision (1987); Fox (1995–1996); ABC (1998–2009); NBC (2011–2012); MSNBC (2013–2014); Fuse (2018)

The American Latino Media Arts Award (the ALMAs or ALMA Awards) was an award highlighting the best Hispanic and Latino American contributions to music, television, and film. The awards promote fair and accurate portrayals of Latinos. In Spanish and Portuguese language, the word alma means "soul".

== History ==
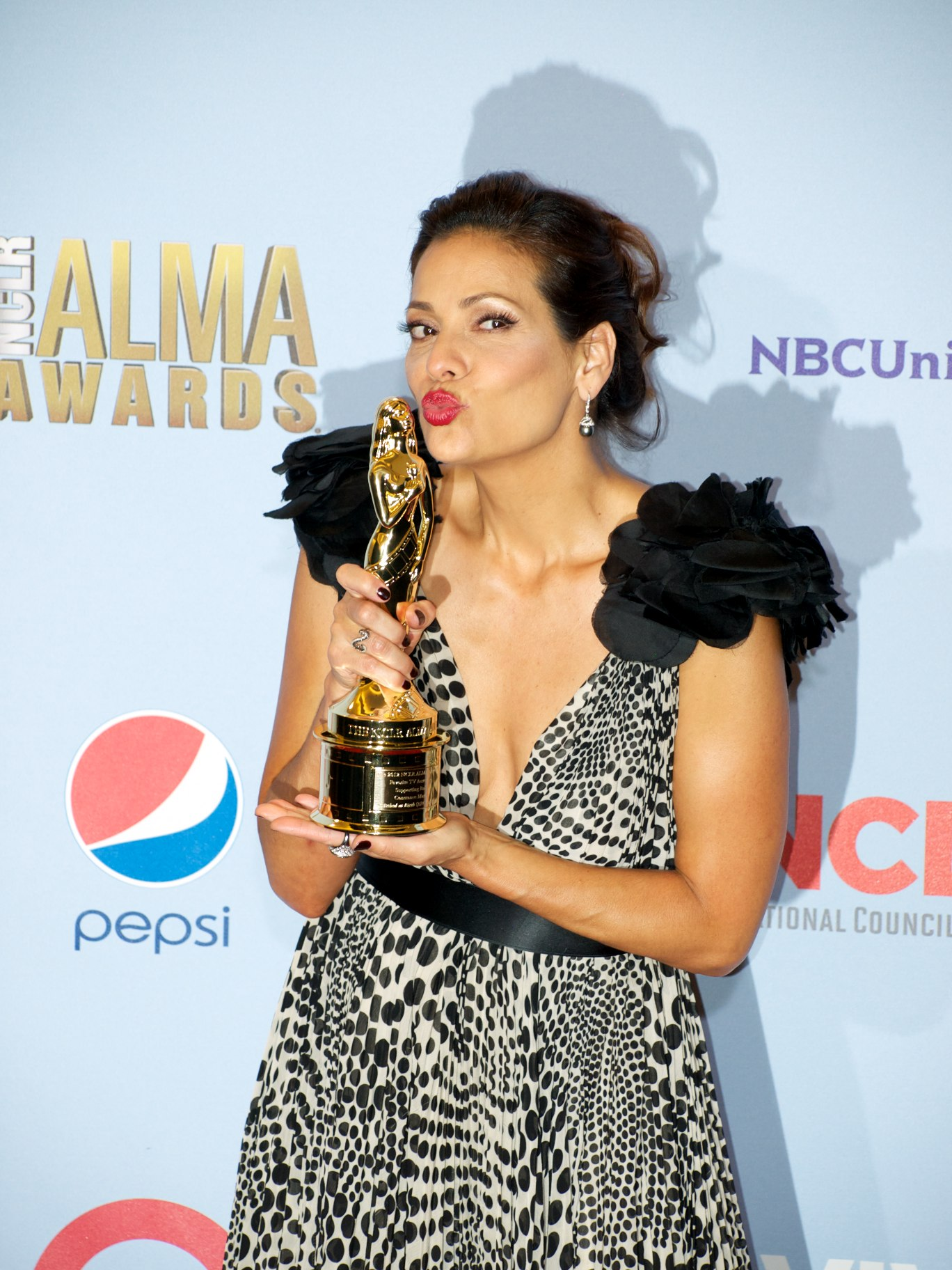
Constance Marie with her trophy at the 2012 ALMA Awards

The awards were created by UnidosUS (formerly the National Council of La Raza). The first ceremonies were held in 1987, under the name "Bravo Awards" and was broadcast on Univision. In 1995, they were televised on Fox. The awards were renamed the "American Latino Media Arts Awards" in 1997, and was moved to ABC. However, ABC faced a boycott which forced the 1997 award ceremonies to be postponed to 1998.

The 2001 awards were the 6th held in the series and had no host. From 2003 to 2005, no awards ceremonies were held. In 2008, the NCLR and New York firm Society Awards redesigned the trophy statuette.

ABC's contact to air the awards expired after the 2009 ceremony. The 2010 ceremony was canceled to "focus on a bigger and better show in 2011".

In 2011 and 2012, the awards aired on NBC, before they moved to MSNBC in 2013 and 2014. The awards were canceled from 2015 to 2017.

In 2018, Fuse announced that it had acquired the rights to the award show in partnership with UnidosUS. The awards were quietly discontinued after the 2018 ceremony.

== Award ceremonies ==
Year	Date	City	Host(s)
1995	December 9, 1995	Los Angeles	Jimmy Smits; Jennifer Lopez
1996	December 14, 1996	Los Angeles	Cheech Marin; Giselle Fernández
1997	No ceremony		
1998	April 19, 1998	Pasadena	Jimmy Smits; Daisy Fuentes
1999	April 11, 1999	Pasadena	Benjamin Bratt
2000	April 15, 2000	Pasadena	Paul Rodriguez
2001	April 22, 2001	Pasadena	None
2002	May 18, 2002	Los Angeles	Paul Rodriguez
2003–2005	No ceremony		
2006	May 7, 2006	Los Angeles	Eva Longoria
2007	June 1, 2007	Pasadena	Eva Longoria
2008	August 17, 2008	Los Angeles	Eva Longoria
2009	September 17, 2009	Santa Monica	George Lopez; Eva Longoria
2010	No ceremony		
2011	September 10, 2011	Santa Monica	George Lopez; Eva Longoria
2012	September 16, 2012	Pasadena	George Lopez; Eva Longoria
2013	September 27, 2013	Pasadena	Eva Longoria; Mario Lopez
2014	October 10, 2014	Pasadena	Eva Longoria; Mario Lopez
2015–2017	No ceremony		
2018	November 4, 2018	Los Angeles	Wilmer Valderrama
