= Dockers Union =

Dockers' Union may refer to:

- Dock, Wharf, Riverside and General Labourers' Union (1887–1922)
- National Union of Dock Labourers (1889–1922)
- Scottish Union of Dock Labourers (1911–1922)
- Transport and General Workers' Union (1922–2007)
