= Tortilla Soup =

2001 American comedy-drama film by María Ripoll

- Original poster
- Directed by: María Ripoll
- Written by: Tom Musca; Ramón Menéndez; Vera Blasi
- Based on: Eat Drink Man Woman by Hui-Ling Wang, Ang Lee, and James Schamus
- Produced by: John Bard Manulis
- Starring: Héctor Elizondo; Jacqueline Obradors; Elizabeth Peña; Tamara Mello; Raquel Welch
- Cinematography: Xavier Pérez Grobet
- Edited by: Andy Blumenthal
- Music by: Bill Conti
- Production companies: Metro-Goldwyn-Mayer; United Artists; Starz/Encore Entertainment
- Distributed by: Samuel Goldwyn Films (US); 20th Century Fox (International)
- Release dates: June 9, 2001 (Seattle International Film Festival); August 31, 2001
- Running time: 103 minutes
- Country: United States
- Language: English
- Box office: $4.5 million

Tortilla Soup is a 2001 American comedy-drama film directed by María Ripoll. The screenplay by Tom Musca, Ramón Menéndez and Vera Blasi is based on the film Eat Drink Man Woman, which was written by Hui-Ling Wang, Ang Lee, and James Schamus.

== Plot ==
Semi-retired Mexican-American chef Martin Naranjo shares a suburban Los Angeles home with his three adult daughters. Although he has lost the senses of smell and taste since his wife's death, he still cooks elaborate, multi-course meals for his family and friends. The women humor their father's old-fashioned ways, but each is searching for fulfillment outside the family circle.

Leticia, the oldest and most conservative of the three, is a repressed high school chemistry teacher who abandoned Catholicism to become a born-again Christian. Middle daughter Carmen shares her father's passion for food but has stifled her dream of owning a restaurant in favor of pursuing a more stable career as a business analyst. Maribel, the youngest, is hip and slightly rebellious.

Frequently present in the Naranjo home are newly divorced family friend Yolanda, her young daughter April, and her visiting mother Hortensia, who has set her sights on Martin and is determined to make him her next husband, unaware his attention is focused on someone else.

Maribel is drawn to handsome Brazilian student, Andy, after her co-worker rejects him and, after they briefly date, she invites him home for dinner, during which she blithely announces she is moving in with him, much to her father's consternation and Andy's shock, since they never had discussed elevating their somewhat casual relationship to this next level. Before long, she is rearranging his small apartment and unintentionally making him increasingly uncomfortable as she imposes herself in his life.

Meanwhile, Leticia finds herself attracted to Orlando Castillo, who coaches baseball at her school, when she begins to receive passionate love letters she believes are from him, unaware they actually were written by her students. Carmen is offered a high-profile job in Barcelona, and half-heartedly agrees to accept it, although soon after her father drives her to the airport she returns home, determined to follow in her father's footsteps and open a restaurant of her own.

Leticia and Orlando elope, Maribel and Andy break up and reunite, Martin marries Yolanda, and everyone gathers for a family meal at Carmen's new restaurant. It is, however, apparent that this family bonds over their love of food.

== Cast ==
- Héctor Elizondo as Martin Naranjo
- Jacqueline Obradors as Carmen Naranjo
- Elizabeth Peña as Leticia Naranjo
- Tamara Mello as Maribel Naranjo
- Raquel Welch as Hortensia
- Paul Rodriguez as Orlando Castillo
- Constance Marie as Yolanda
- Marisabel García as April
- Nikolai Kinski as Andy
- Julio Oscar Mechoso as Gomez
- Jude Herrera as Eden
- Ken Marino as Jeff
- Troy Ruptash as Hairdresser
- Louis Crugnali as Catering Assistant
- Joel Joan as Antonio Urgell
- Ulises Cuadra as Snide Student (as Ulysses Cuadra)
- Mark de la Cruz as April's Classmate
- Eli Russell Linnetz as April's Classmate
- Stoney Westmoreland as Baseball Umpire
- Karen Dyer as Rachel
- Anthony C Sena as Chef/Wait Staff

== Production ==
The film was shot on location in El Segundo, Encino and Los Angeles in California.

The meals featured in the film were prepared by celebrity chefs Mary Sue Milliken and Susan Feniger who, as hosts of the Food Network program Too Hot Tamales, introduced viewers to their contemporary take on traditional Mexican cuisine. The production design was by the Argentine designer Alicia Maccarone.

The film's soundtrack includes "Sem contenção" by Bebel Gilberto, "Cuchi-Cuchi" and "Si estuvieras aquí" by Los Amigos Invisibles, "A bailar" by Patricio Castillo, "Si en un final" by Eliades Ochoa, "Call Waiting" by Zap Mama, "Perhaps, Perhaps, Perhaps" by Lila Downs, "Les Portes Du Souvenir" by Les Nubians, and "Amado mío" by Pink Martini.

== Critical response ==
The film received positive reviews from critics. On Rotten Tomatoes the film has an approval rating of 74% based on reviews from 74 critics. The consensus reads, "An English remake of Ang Lee's Eat Drink Man Woman, Tortilla Soup is as charming and flavorful as the dishes it features." Metacritic, which uses a weighted average, assigned the film a score of 58 out of 100, based on 23 critics, indicating "mixed or average" reviews.

Elvis Mitchell of The New York Times called the film "forgettable" and "as predictable as a fast-food restaurant." Although he thought it "has more warm, likable actors and agile performances than this material merits," he felt their "exuberance goes a long way, but not far enough."

Kevin Thomas of the Los Angeles Times wrote "Director Maria Ripoli and adapters Vera Blasi, Tom Musca and Ramon Menendez honor the strength, wisdom and humor of their source but imbue Tortilla Soup with a life of its own." He added, "The film’s ensemble cast is headed with understated humor and authority by Elizondo and shows to special advantage Pena’s droll gifts as a comedian. Welch sails into view as spectacular-looking as ever, and she easily conveys the humor in the affected Hortensia, a husband hunter so flashy and obvious--to everybody but herself--as to be endearing. Obradors and Mello are as skilled as they are lovely, and Rodriguez and Kinski make appealing suitors. Tortilla Soup is worth sipping."

Roger Ebert of the Chicago Sun-Times called the film "a warm human comedy that has no great deep message but simply makes us feel good" and added, "Tortilla Soup follows a familiar formula, in which the movie opens with everyone unmarried and we suspect it will have to end with everyone happily paired-off. But the movie is cast so well that the actors bring life to their predictable destinies, and Elizondo casts a kind of magical warm spell over them all."

== Awards and nominations ==
Elizabeth Peña tied with Elpidia Carrillo in Bread and Roses for the ALMA Award for Outstanding Supporting Actress in a Motion Picture, and the film tied with Bread and Roses for the Imagen Foundation Award for Best Feature Film.

== Home media ==
The film was released on DVD on January 15, 2002. It is in fullscreen format with audio tracks and subtitles in English and Spanish.

== See also ==
- History of the Mexican Americans in Los Angeles
