= Money for Nothing (1993 film) =

1993 film by Ramón Menéndez

- Theatrical film poster
- Directed by: Ramón Menéndez
- Screenplay by: Ramón Menéndez; Tom Musca; Carol Sobieski
- Based on: "Finders Keepers" by Mark Bowden
- Produced by: Tom Musca
- Starring: John Cusack; Michael Madsen
- Cinematography: Tom Sigel
- Edited by: Nancy Richardson
- Music by: Craig Safan
- Production company: Hollywood Pictures
- Distributed by: Buena Vista Pictures Distribution
- Release date: September 10, 1993
- Running time: 100 minutes
- Country: United States
- Language: English
- Budget: $11 million
- Box office: $1,039,824

Money for Nothing is a 1993 American biographical comedy crime film directed by Ramón Menéndez, and written by Menéndez, Tom Musca and Carol Sobieski, based on the 1986 Philadelphia Inquirer article "Finders Keepers" by Mark Bowden. The film stars John Cusack in the leading role, with a supporting cast that includes Michael Madsen, Debi Mazar, Benicio del Toro, Maury Chaykin, Michael Rapaport, James Gandolfini, Philip Seymour Hoffman and Fionnula Flanagan.

It is loosely based on the life of Joey Coyle (Cusack), who, in 1981, discovered $1.2 million that had fallen out of an armored van in Philadelphia, Pennsylvania. The film is a fictionalization of events, depicting Coyle's struggles with keeping the money over a five-day period.

The film adaptation of Coyle's story originated in December 1983, before production plans languished in development hell. Executive producers Gordon Freedman and Matt Tolmach acquired the rights in 1990, and the project continued development at The Walt Disney Studios. The film was shot on locations in Pittsburgh and Philadelphia, with principal photography beginning in February 1993 and concluding after eight weeks.

Coyle, who acted as a consultant on the film, died by suicide on August 15, 1993, three weeks before the film's theatrical release. In response, Disney chose to quietly release Money for Nothing under its adult film banner Hollywood Pictures, on September 10. The film was not well-received by critics, though Cusack's performance received some praise. The film was a box-office bomb, grossing $1 million against a production budget of $11 million.

== Plot ==
In Philadelphia, a cart containing $1.2 million in $100 bills falls out of an armored van as it leaves the Federal Reserve Bank. Joey Coyle, a struggling longshoreman, finds the cart laying on the side of a road, and decides to keep the bags of money. He reveals the discovery to his friend Kenny Kozlowski, who is driving his father's car. After Kenny refuses to be incriminated, Joey decides to keep the money for himself.

Upon returning home, Joey stashes a large portion of the money in his closet, and tries to keep it a secret from his mother, siblings Billy and Eleanor, and niece Katie. South Philadelphia Police Detective Pat Laurenzi is assigned to investigate, and discovers that the van's faulty latch is to blame for the money falling out of the vehicle. News reports of the money's disappearance attract significant attention among local residents.

Joey meets with his former girlfriend, investment banker Monica Russo, and asks how he can make a large deposit without attracting the Internal Revenue Service. Monica initially scoffs at the notion that he would have a large sum of cash laying around, but ultimately deduces that he found the money that was reported missing.

Joey then goes to his favorite bar and buys rounds of drinks for its patrons, claiming to have won earnings from a horse racing bet. He confides the truth to Dino Palladino, a bookmaker who agrees to help launder the money. Although he is unable to comprehend how the laundering scheme works, Joey agrees to the terms proposed by Dino's boss Vincente Goldoni.

Laurenzi finds a homeless boy who reveals that he saw someone take the money and identifies the make and model of the car belonging to Kenny's father. At the bar, some of the patrons begin to question how Joey got the money, and their suspicions are heightened when Laurenzi walks in and asks questions. Worried that the detective will discover the car Kenny was driving, Joey drives the vehicle into a river. When his mother and siblings realize what has happened, he offers to share the money with them, but they strongly object to keeping something that is not rightfully theirs.

After hiding the money in Monica's office, Joey goes to Goldoni's office with a gun and forces Dino to give him back his first batch of cash. He is furious when he discovers that Goldoni has changed the money into nickels and quarters. After recovering the car from the river, Laurenzi confronts Kenny while Kenny's father beat him with a belt, who confirms that Joey found the money.

Joey returns to the bar and watches a news report identifying him as the thief. The other patrons label him as a hero and vow to protect his identity, much to Billy's frustration. Dino attempts to shoot and kill Joey in the restroom, but is subdued by Billy, who then urges his brother to leave town. Monica arrives with the remainder of the money and airline tickets. They spend a night at a hotel where Monica bleaches Joey's hair and counts the cash obsessively. At the bar, Laurenzi interrogates Dino, who, to avoid being implicated, arranges to have the money that Joey tried to launder returned without question.

Joey and Monica go the airport and are unknowingly pursued by Laurenzi, who searches the terminals. After being informed that his suitcase containing the cash is too big to carry onboard the plane, Joey purchases a pair of pantyhose from a gift shop and stuffs the money down his pants. Once through the security checkpoint, he goes to a restroom and transfers the money into a small duffel bag. As Joey and Monica try to board the plane, Laurenzi notices them standing in line and raises his gun. Joey flees, but he and Monica are quickly surrounded by other police officers and arrested.

An epilogue reveals that the armored car company recovered all but roughly $196,000 of the stolen money. Joey was charged with theft, conspiracy and receiving stolen property, but was acquitted of all charges by reason of temporary insanity.

== Cast ==
- John Cusack as Joey Coyle
- Michael Madsen as Detective Pat Laurenzi
- Debi Mazar as Monica Russo
- Benicio Del Toro as Dino Pallidino
- Maury Chaykin as Vincente Goldoni
- Michael Rapaport as Kenny Kozlowski
- James Gandolfini as Billy Coyle
- Philip S. Hoffman as Cochran
- Fionnula Flanagan as Mrs. Coyle
- Frankie Faison as Madigan
- Elizabeth Bracco as Eleanor Coyle
- Currie Graham as Dunleavy
- Lenny Venito as Steve Hrbek
- Bingo O'Malley as Old Man
- Barbara Russell as Female Traveller

In addition, Joey Coyle makes an uncredited appearance as a dockworker in the film's opening scene. The film is dedicated to Coyle, who died on August 15, 1993.

== Historical context ==
On February 26, 1981 in Philadelphia, Pennsylvania, Joey Coyle, an unemployed longshoreman, had been travelling with his friends and co-workers John Behlau and Jed Pennock, when he discovered two canvas bags on the side of a road, roughly one block from Purolator Armored Services. Both bags had been picked up from the Federal Reserve Bank of Philadelphia, and contained $1.2 million in $100 bills. They had fallen from one of Purolator's armored vans, on the Swanson and Porter Streets in South Philadelphia after the driver hit a speed bump. That night, Philadelphia Police Detective Pat Laurenzi began a neighborhood search after two eyewitnesses reported the make and model of the vehicle that Behlau was driving, a 1971 Chevrolet Malibu, and a person with their hands full entering the vehicle before it drove off. The FBI was later brought in to aid the investigation.

Coyle gave away portions of the cash to family, friends and strangers, in addition to supporting his drug addiction to methamphetamines. He later met with another friend, Carl Masi, who learned from a radio scanner that police had issued a search for Belhau's car. After abandoning the vehicle in Gloucester City, New Jersey, Masi warned Coyle to turn the money in to police. Coyle refused, and days later he allegedly met with Mario Riccobene, a member of the Philadelphia crime family who was to instruct him on how to properly handle the money. Coyle gave Riccobene $400,000, hoping the latter would have the $100 bills laundered down to smaller denominations by playing at a Las Vegas casino. After more than 500 tips from eyewitnesses, Laurenzi received a police report of Behlau's car in Gloucester City. Belhau and Pennock later turned themselves in to the police, both revealing how Coyle found the money, as well as his interactions with Masi.

Coyle decided to leave town in fear of being caught by police or hunted by other mobsters. He turned to his friend Francis A. Santos, who bought him a plane ticket and spent the night with him in New York City. On March 3, 1981, both men were arrested by FBI agents at the John F. Kennedy International Airport. At the time of his arrest, Coyle was attempting to check in for a flight to Acapulco, Mexico. He was carrying $105,000 in 21 envelopes (each containing $5,000) that were stuffed inside a pair of cowboy boots he was wearing. Roughly $1,003,400 of the missing money was recovered; the remainder was never found. Belhau, Pennock and Masi were not charged.

Coyle was charged with theft, conspiracy, receiving stolen property and Unlawful Flight to Avoid Prosecution with a maximum sentence of seven years. Santos received an accessory charge that was ultimately dropped. During trial, Coyle's lawyer Harold Kane argued that his client's actions upon discovering the money were motivated by insanity and not greed. On March 5, 1982, a jury found Coyle innocent by reason of temporary insanity.

In April 1983, Coyle filed a lawsuit against Purolator, claiming that the company's negligence in not properly securing the money was the cause of his insanity. The suit, filed at a Philadelphia Common Pleas Court, asked for $20,000 in damages. The following June, a federal judge dismissed the case, ruling that Coyle's mental injuries were caused by his own "weak" character.

In 1986, journalist Mark Bowden interviewed Coyle, as well as family and friends closest to him about their experiences. His article "Finders Keepers" was published as a three-part serial for The Philadelphia Inquirer in December 1986. Bowden later adapted the article into a 2002 book titled Finders Keepers: The Story of a Man who Found $1 Million.

For much of his adult life, Coyle struggled with drug addiction, and had become despondent over the death of his mother in 1981. On August 15, 1993, Coyle was found dead from an apparent suicide by hanging in his South Philadelphia home.

== Production ==
=== Development ===
The film adaptation of Joey Coyle's story originated in December 1983, when a New York-based production company known as The Film Writers Company expressed interest in producing a film detailing his discovery of the money. Screenwriter Mark Kram and story editor David Loucka were scheduled to meet with Coyle, and tour South Philadelphia during pre-production. Coyle signed a contract with the production company in which he would receive an estimated $100,000, plus a percentage of the film's profits. Coyle and his lawyer Harold Kane were approached by numerous film and television executives, but production plans languished in development hell.

After being informed by Kane that the rights had been optioned, the film's executive producers Gordon Freedman and Matt Tolmach acquired the film rights in 1990, after bidding against another competitor. The film continued development at The Walt Disney Studios under the working title Found Money. Mark Bowden sold an option on the article a year later before joining the production as a consultant. When Coyle expressed reluctance, the studio generated an interest in basing the film's events on Bowden's article. On the advice of his lawyer Kane, Coyle agreed to consult on the film, and received an up-front payment of $70,000 by the studio. Disney allocated a production budget of $11 million.

Director Ramón Menéndez and producer Tom Musca joined the project shortly thereafter. Both are credited with co-writing the screenplay with Carol Sobieski; Sobieski, who died on November 4, 1990, was given a posthumous credit. The director stated that he wanted the story to illustrate "what it means for a kid like that to find money." The filmmakers chose to omit Coyle's drug addiction and bouts with depression, and many characters were composites of actual people.

During pre-production, Menéndez, Musca and costume designer Zeca Seabra traveled to Philadelphia and interviewed various people related to Coyle. In conceiving wardrobe ideas for the film, Seabra met with Coyle, his friends and Pat Laurenzi, the police detective who investigated the stolen money. To prepare for the leading role, John Cusack travelled to Philadelphia in October 1992, and met with Bowden before befriending Coyle a month later.

=== Filming ===
Principal photography began on February 1, 1993, under the working title Joey Coyle. The opening scene was shot on location on Pier 80 in the Port of Philadelphia. Due to budget restraints, the remainder of filming took place in Pittsburgh, Pennsylvania. Scenes set in Joey's neighborhood were shot in Lawrenceville. St. Kieran's Catholic School doubled for interior scenes set in the South Philadelphia Police Department, while PNC Financial Services served as Monica's investment office, with the company's employees appearing as extras. The scene in which Joey finds the money was filmed in Duquesne, Pennsylvania at the Duquesne Steel Works, an inoperative steel mill. Principal photography concluded after eight weeks of filming.

== Release ==
Coyle died by suicide on August 15, 1993, three weeks before the film's theatrical release. In response, Menéndez and producer Tom Musca traveled to Philadelphia to console Coyle's family and friends and discuss making an appropriate tribute for the film. Disney's initial release strategy involved a worldwide press tour, with Coyle and Cusack heavily promoting the film. After Coyle's death, the studio chose to quietly release the film with little marketing and promotion under its film label Hollywood Pictures. Money for Nothing was released nationwide on September 10, 1993, to 449 theaters. After 113 days (16 weeks) of release, the film grossed $1,039,824 in the United States and Canada, failing to recoup its $11 million budget.

== Home media ==
Buena Vista Home Entertainment released the film on DVD on November 11, 2003, under its Hollywood Pictures Home Entertainment banner. A Blu-ray version was released on May 10, 2011, by Mill Creek Entertainment. Mill Creek also released it on DVD, as part of a "Triple Feature" bundle pack with two other comedies, Disorganized Crime (1989) and Another Stakeout (1993). On June 4, 2019, Kino Lorber re-released the film on Blu-ray.

== Reception ==
=== Critical response ===
Upon release, the film received mostly negative reviews from mainstream critics. Online reviewer James Berardinelli wrote, "There's nothing horrible about Money for Nothing. It has a story to tell, and it accomplishes that aim, albeit in a workmanlike fashion. However, with everything being so straightforward and unremarkable, I can't say it's worth the time or money." Megan Rosenfeld of The Washington Post felt that the film "gets close to being a deft modern fable but flirts with cheap comedy too often ... " Brian Lowry of Variety magazine felt that the filmmakers "never bring much life to this production, in part because Joey's efforts are so inept and misguided from the get-go." John Petrakis of the Chicago Tribune praised Cusack's "excellent performance", but concluded, " ... Money for Nothing might have been another Melvin and Howard. But in a short-sighted attempt to hedge their bet, [the filmmakers] water down their main character, which dilutes their story, weakening their film. And that, as they say, is just too bad." Glenn Kenny of Entertainment Weekly described Cusack's portrayal of Coyle as being "so utterly dense that Money for Nothing is literally painful to watch — even in the privacy of one's home — whenever he's on screen." Eli Kooris of The Austin Chronicle, wrote, " ... while the stellar cast keeps the film from being a complete failure, the slow story and convoluted tone leave the viewer all but broke in the end."

One positive review came from the Sun-Sentinel's Candice Russell, who wrote, "Based on a true story, the drama is laced with hilarious highs of humor. At its core, however, is a hard sense of realism that is to be applauded. The filmmakers never take the easy way out." Another review by Kevin Thomas of the Los Angeles Times praised Cusack's performance, and noted that the film "further confirms [Cusack]'s versatility. He plays a working-class Irish-American as if he were born and bred in South Philly and, most important, suggests that Joey is foolish and unlucky rather than simply stupid and greedy." On the review aggregator website Rotten Tomatoes, 20% of 5 critics' reviews are positive.
