= John Cusack =

American actor, producer, and screenwriter (born 1966)

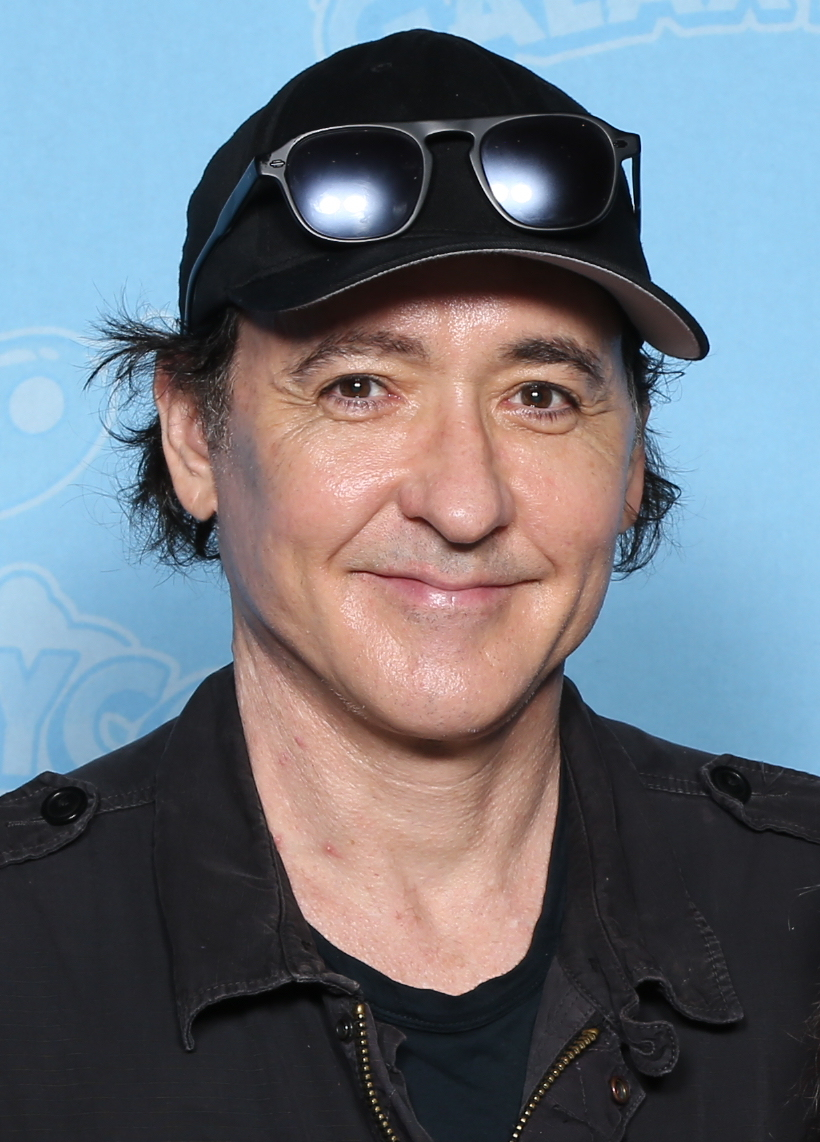
- Cusack in 2019
- Born: John Paul Cusack; June 28, 1966 (age 60); Evanston, Illinois, U.S.
- Occupation: Actor
- Years active: 1983–present
- Political party: Democratic
- Other political affiliations: Democratic Socialists of America
- Father: Dick Cusack
- Relatives: Ann Cusack (sister); Joan Cusack (sister)

John Paul Cusack (/ˈkjuːsæk/ KEW-sak; born June 28, 1966) is an American actor and screenwriter. With a career spanning over four decades, he has appeared in over ninety films. He began acting in films during the 1980s, appearing in coming-of-age dramedies such as Sixteen Candles (1984), Better Off Dead (1985), The Sure Thing (1985), Stand by Me (1986), and Say Anything... (1989). Moving away from his teen idol image, he went on to appear in a variety of genres, such as the crime thrillers The Grifters (1990) and The Paperboy (2012), the black comedies Bullets Over Broadway (1994) and Grosse Pointe Blank (1997), the romantic comedy Serendipity (2001), the time-traveling comedy Hot Tub Time Machine (2010), psychological thriller Identity (2003), the action thriller Con Air (1997), and the psychological horror film 1408 (2007).

Cusack has been nominated for several awards, including a Golden Globe for his starring role in High Fidelity (2000). He won the 2014 Canadian Screen Award for Best Supporting Actor for his performance in Maps to the Stars (2014).

== Early life ==
Cusack was born on June 28, 1966, in Evanston, Illinois, a suburb of Chicago. He is Irish Catholic. His parents are writer-actor-producer and documentary filmmaker Richard J. "Dick" Cusack (1925–2003), originally from New York City, and Ann Paula "Nancy" Cusack (née Carolan; 1929–2022), originally from Massachusetts, a former mathematics teacher and political activist. John's older sisters, Ann and Joan, are also actors. Cusack has two other siblings, Bill and Susie. The family moved from Manhattan, New York City, to Illinois and were friends of activist Philip Berrigan. Cusack graduated from Evanston Township High School in 1984, where he met Jeremy Piven. Cusack spent a year at New York University before dropping out, saying that he had "too much fire" in his belly and "not enough smarts" in his brain.

== Career ==
=== 1980s ===
Cusack began acting in films in the early 1980s. In 1980, he appeared in a 16mm educational film short about teen problem solving titled Why Is It Always Me?. His first on-screen theatrical film appearances were in minor roles, Class (1983) and John Hughes' directorial debut film Sixteen Candles (1984). On the set of Grandview, U.S.A. (1984), his co-star Jamie Lee Curtis gifted Cusack with his first car, a 1974 Chevrolet Impala, which she had named 'La Bamba'. At sixteen years old, Cusack made his breakthrough performance in Rob Reiner's teen comedy The Sure Thing (1985), which was a critical success.

Cusack took on the small-town teen dark comedy film Better Off Dead (1985). He was initially embarrassed and disappointed by the film, describing it as the "worst thing he had ever seen" on his first watch. The film had a budget of $3 million and grossed $10.3 million at the box office, but the studio still considered it a failure. Cusack starred in Savage Steve Holland's film One Crazy Summer (1986).

Cusack then had a brief appearance in Reiner's Stand by Me (1986), a film based on Stephen King's The Body. On the film, co-star Kiefer Sutherland recalled, "John Cusack was on the film for at least a week. I admired what he was doing and thought he was an actor I wanted to emulate." In 1988, Cusack went on and starred in the independent film Eight Men Out (1988), about Major League Baseball's Black Sox Scandal during the 1919 World Series. He also appeared in the cult comedy Tapeheads (1988), a film by executive producer Michael Nesmith.

In the late 1980s, Cusack starred in Cameron Crowe's directorial debut film, Say Anything... (1989). He starred opposite actress Ione Skye. Cusack was reluctant to do the film at first, but he gave his character dimension by referring to the punk bands The Clash and The Replacements. In the film, Cusack became known for the boombox scene, in which his character, Lloyd Dobler, stands near his girlfriend Diane's bedroom window, and wordlessly holds up a cassette player above his head, playing Peter Gabriel's 1986 song "In Your Eyes". His character has since become influential in popular culture, such as the band Lloyd Dobler Effect, and Frank Iero's band Pencey Prep with their misspelled song "Lloyd Dobbler".

=== 1990s ===
In the 1990s, Cusack played a con artist in Stephen Frears' 1990 neo-noir film The Grifters. He then appeared in a series of independent films such as True Colors (1991), and Money for Nothing (1993). For Quentin Tarantino's second film, Pulp Fiction (1994), Cusack declined the role of Lance, which went to Eric Stoltz.

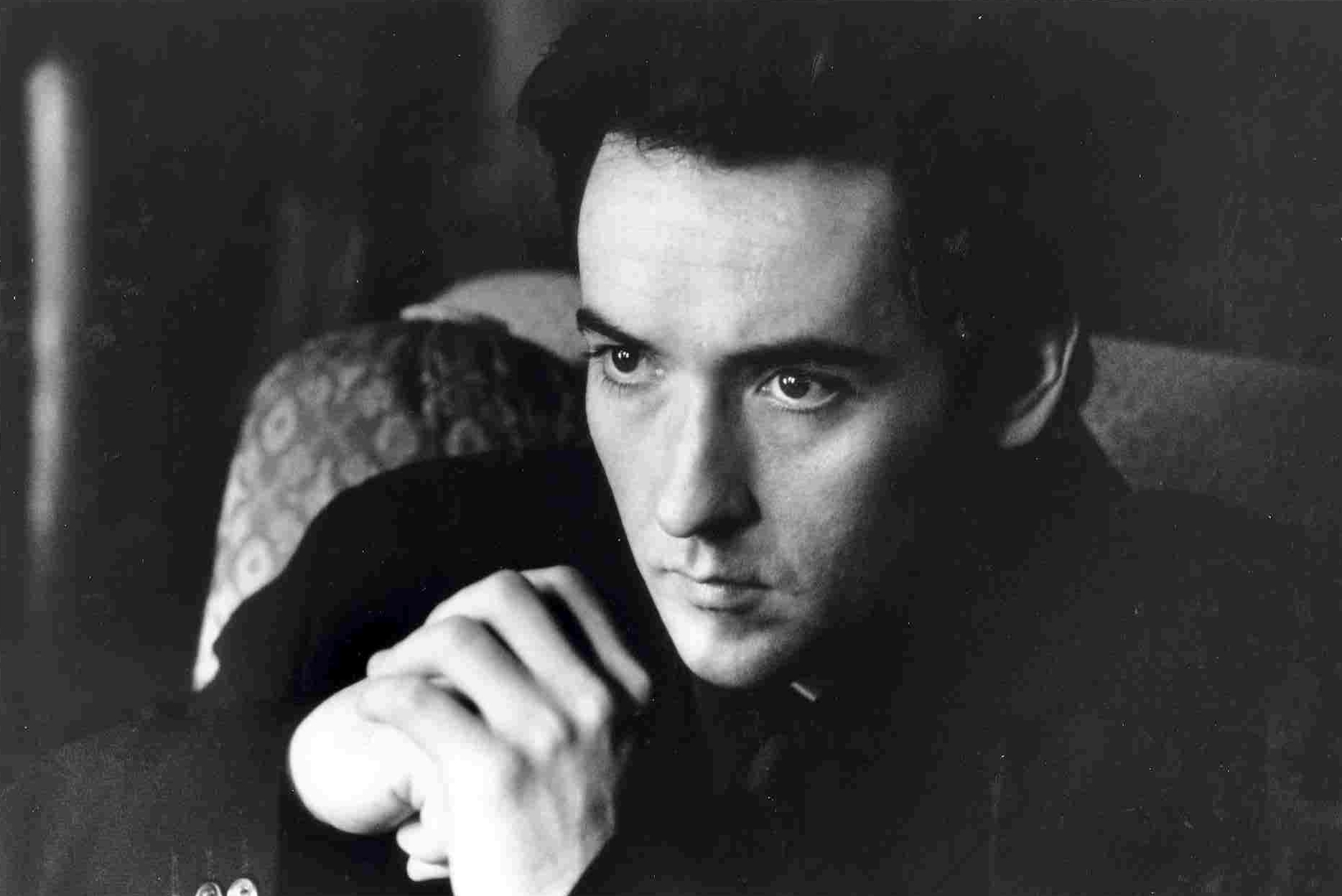
Cusack in Grosse Pointe Blank (1997)

After establishing New Crime Productions, Cusack co-wrote the screenplay for, and starred in, George Armitage's crime film Grosse Pointe Blank (1997), in which he played an assassin who goes to his ten-year high school reunion to win back his high school sweetheart. Released in the same year, Cusack also starred in the Nicolas Cage action film Con Air (1997) as the United States Marshal Vince Larkin, and in Clint Eastwood's Midnight in the Garden of Good and Evil (1997). He also voiced Dimitri in the animated film Anastasia (1997).

In the critically acclaimed Spike Jonze film Being John Malkovich (1999), with a script written by Charlie Kaufman, Cusack played a puppeteer who finds a portal leading into the mind of the actor, John Malkovich. The film was nominated for three Academy Awards, including Best Director (Jonze), Best Original Screenplay (Charlie Kaufman) and Best Supporting Actress (Catherine Keener).

=== 2000s ===
Cusack was nominated for a Golden Globe Award for Best Actor – Motion Picture Musical or Comedy for his performance in High Fidelity (2000), based on Nick Hornby's novel about Rob, a record store owner, and the history of his failed relationships. In the early 2000s, Cusack appeared in a few romantic comedies such as America's Sweethearts (2001), Serendipity (2001), Must Love Dogs (2005), playing opposite lead actresses Julia Roberts, Kate Beckinsale, and Diane Lane.

Cusack starred in a series of thriller films such as Identity (2003), Runaway Jury (2003), The Contract (2006), and 1408 (2007), based on Stephen King's short story 1408. The film largely went unnoticed at the time of release, but is now considered an underrated horror film. He also appeared in the action comedies The Ice Harvest (2005), and War, Inc. (2008), as well as James C. Strouse's directorial debut film Grace Is Gone (2007), in which he played the grieving widower of a soldier killed in the Iraq War.

In Roland Emmerich's epic disaster film 2012 (2009), Cusack starred as Jackson Curtis, a struggling novelist who attempts to save his family during a global cataclysm.

=== 2010s ===
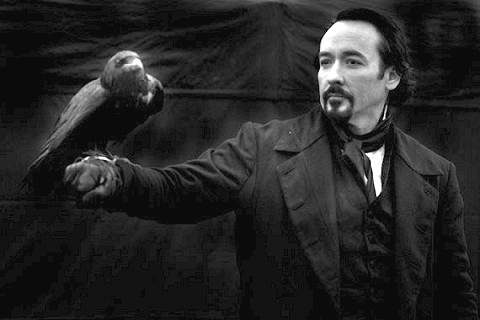
Cusack as Edgar Allan Poe in The Raven (2012)

In the 2010s, Cusack starred in and produced the comedy film Hot Tub Time Machine (2010); he did not feature in the sequel, Hot Tub Time Machine 2 (2015), however, apart from a cameo that is only included in the unrated home release. Both films were directed by Steve Pink.

Cusack co-starred in the crime-drama The Paperboy by Lee Daniels, released in 2012. The same year, Cusack played Edgar Allan Poe in James McTeigue's biopic film The Raven (2012). On acting in a real life role, Cusack said, "You have to get yourself as close to insanity as you can, but yet, be able to not go insane." He referred to the source of Poe's letters and writing, and used it as material for his role. Cusack then starred in another real life role as Richard Nixon in Lee Daniels' The Butler (2013). Daniels later said, "I love working with John Cusack. He's terrifying, he's electrifying, and he inspires me to be a better director. He's a fiery, intense presence on set. We never, ever rub up against each other but he fuels me."

In 2014, Cusack appeared in another biopic film, Love & Mercy (2014) as Brian Wilson of The Beach Boys, and worked closely with Wilson himself during the making of the film. In the same year, Cusack also starred in David Cronenberg's Maps to the Stars (2014). He won a Canadian Screen Award for Best Supporting Actor for his role in Maps to the Stars (2014). This era was a new peak in his career, however, in 2014, Cusack infamously criticized Hollywood, calling it "a whorehouse" where "people go mad."

In 2015, he played a supporting role in Spike Lee's Chi-Raq. He also appeared in Dragon Blade, his first Chinese production, alongside Jackie Chan and Adrien Brody. Cusack starred in another Stephen King adaptation, Cell, in 2016, again with co-star Samuel L. Jackson. But unlike their first collaboration 1408, Cell received predominantly negative critic reviews and was released to video on demand before a limited theatrical run. In 2019, he played the villain in the western Never Grow Old opposite Emile Hirsch.

Other films Cusack starred during that decade are The Factory (2012), The Numbers Station (2013), The Frozen Ground (2013), Grand Piano (2013), Drive Hard (2014), The Prince (2014), Reclaim (2014), Arsenal (2017), Blood Money (2017), Singularity (2017), Distorted (2018), and River Runs Red (2018).

=== 2020s–present ===
Cusack starred in his first television series, Utopia in 2020. In a 2020 interview with The Guardian, Cusack admitted to the decline of his acting career. "In the last few years, I haven't been able to get projects financed. That could be a function of getting older. Or it could be a function of being cold."

In 2022, he co-starred in the thriller Pursuit, alongside Emile Hirsch.

In 2024, Cusack appeared in the Chinese period film Decoded by writer-director Chen Sicheng, alongside Liu Haoran. In 2025, Cusack took on a role in another film by Chen Sicheng, also starring Liu Haoran: Detective Chinatown 1900. Cusack portrayed Congressman Grant, a character central to the film's exploration of anti-Chinese sentiment in early 20th-century San Francisco. The film, a prequel to the successful Detective Chinatown franchise, was released on January 29, 2025, and earned $455 million at the box office. Also in 2025, he appeared in the WWII thriller Fog of War.

Cusack wrote the graphic novel Momo featuring art by Ignacio Noé and published by Mad Cave Studios, which was released in late September 2026. In an interview with Publishers Weekly, Cusack described the story as a "wild fusion of theological noir, cosmic satire, and darkly comic Americana in a mind-bending odyssey".

== Political views ==
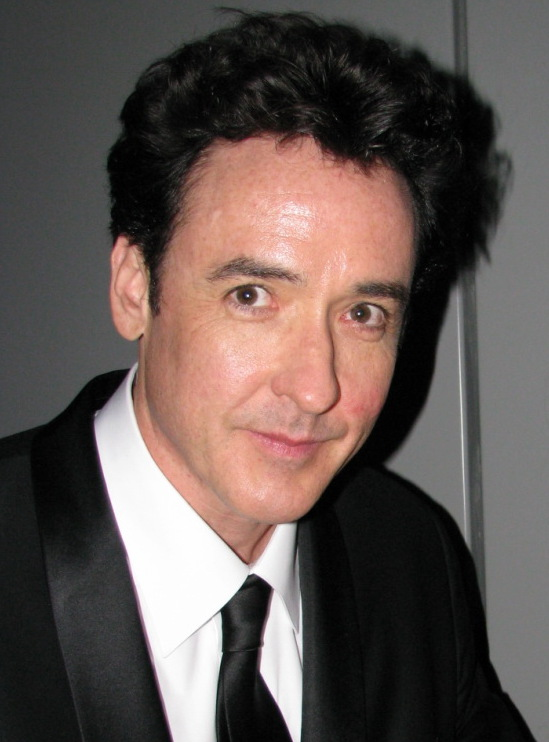
Cusack at Huffington Post Pre-Inaugural Party in January 2009

Cusack is anti-war, having tweeted, "Being anti-war — is pro-troops — pro-human". Cusack endorsed Democratic presidential candidate Wesley Clark in the 2004 presidential election. Between 2005 and 2009, Cusack wrote blogs for The Huffington Post, which included an interview with Naomi Klein. He voiced his opposition to the war in Iraq and the George W. Bush administration, calling the government's worldview "depressing, corrupt, unlawful, and tragically absurd". He also appeared in a June 2008 MoveOn.org advertisement, where he said that George W. Bush and John McCain had the same governing priorities.

Cusack criticized the Obama administration for its drone policy in the Middle East and its support of the National Defense Authorization Act, and became one of the initial supporters of the Freedom of the Press Foundation in 2012. In June 2015, he stated in an interview with The Daily Beast that "when you talk about drones, the American Empire, the NSA, civil liberties, attacks on journalism and whistleblowers, [Obama] is as bad or worse than Bush". He later criticized the publication for misquoting him in order to make an interesting headline.

At a Moscow hotel room in 2015, Cusack, Daniel Ellsberg, and Arundhati Roy met Edward Snowden, who had fled the US because of his leaks of classified information surrounding illegal population surveillance. This meeting was converted into a book co-authored with Roy titled Things That Can and Cannot Be Said.

Cusack endorsed Senator Bernie Sanders in his 2016 and 2020 presidential bids. He is a member of the Democratic Socialists of America.

During May 2020, Cusack was recording a George Floyd protest in Chicago on social media when he was attacked by police with batons and later pepper-sprayed.

I would love to think about other things—poetry, love, anything else. But that's just not the times we're in. And, y'know, not all anger is just sort of somebody stuck in some rut in a basement. If you can't be outraged on behalf of other people, or express anger at injustice, maybe that is its own rut. Sure, I might go too far sometimes. But I really just want to get across the message: that we're sleepwalking into an incredibly dark possible future. Maybe being outspoken hurts your career… I'm just aware it helps me sleep better at night, knowing that I wasn't passive during this time.

— John Cusack, The Guardian (October 4, 2020)

Cusack has also been a vocal critic of Donald Trump, calling him "an evil fuck who grinds our faces in it every day". During the 2020 presidential election, he pledged on social media that he would vote to "kick Trump's loathsome Nazi ass out of the White House and into prison".

On March 19, 2025, Cusack joined the "#TeslaTakedown Mass Mobilizing Call", a remote protest targeting Tesla, Inc. and its CEO, Elon Musk, for his role in the Trump administration, especially his leadership of the Department of Government Efficiency (DOGE). During the call, Cusack said, "Like Trump, Musk is a pathological liar. He's a criminal. He's a sociopath and a ghoul."

On January 28, 2026, in an opinion piece in the Chicago Sun-Times, Cusack argues against paywalls imposed by news websites, suggesting they deprive the public of information that in some cases ought to be freely available (e.g., reporting based on documents obtained through FOIA requests). Removing paywalls on even a limited number of articles, he says, could lead to a better-informed public and greater government accountability — and may, in the long run, make good business sense for the news organization.

=== Israel–Palestine ===
Cusack has been fiercely critical of Israel's military actions against Palestinians. He criticized Israel's killing of Palestinians in the 2014 Gaza War, and retweeted articles supporting Gaza for weeks. In 2018, Cusack signed an open letter in support of Lorde cancelling performances in Israel, which was in response to a request from the BDS movement.

In June 2019, Cusack tweeted out an image of a large fist with a blue Star of David crushing a small crowd of people next to a quote by neo-Nazi Kevin Alfred Strom often misattributed to Voltaire: "To learn who rules over you, simply find out who you are not allowed to criticize". In the tweet, Cusack added the words "Follow the money." He later deleted the tweet and apologized, saying that "In reaction to Palestinian human rights under Israeli occupation, an issue that concerns anyone fighting for justice, I [retweeted] and quickly deleted an image that's harmful to both Jewish and Palestinian friends, and for that I'm sorry... antisemitism has no place in any rational political dialogue".

Following the 2023 October 7 attacks and the subsequent Israeli invasion of the Gaza Strip, Cusack signed an open letter (Artists4Ceasefire) urging Joe Biden to "call for and facilitate a ceasefire without delay". He also blocked and direct messaged pro-Israel and Zionist Twitter users' insults, and said that Israel is conducting a genocide in Gaza.

In 2024, the pro-Israel group StopAntisemitism included Cusack in its list of candidates for its "Antisemite of the Year" award, alongside other critics of Israel such as activist Greta Thunberg and politician Cori Bush. In response, Cusack called the group "lunatics" and their statements about him "ridiculous lies".

On July 7, 2025, Cusack posted a meme on social media website Bluesky linking former United States Secretary of State Antony Blinken to Jeffrey Epstein, leading to Cusack being accused of antisemitism. Cusack deleted the post within two hours after posting it.

== Personal life ==
Cusack trained in kickboxing under former world kickboxing champion Benny Urquidez for over 20 years. He began training under Urquidez in preparation for his role in Say Anything... and holds the rank of a level six black belt in Urquidez's Ukidokan Kickboxing system.

In March 2008, police arrested Emily Leatherman outside Cusack's Malibu, California, home for stalking him. On October 10, 2008, Leatherman pleaded no contest and received five years' probation and mandatory psychiatric counseling, and was ordered to stay away from Cusack, his home, and business for the next 10 years.

== Filmography ==
=== Film ===
Year	Title	Role	Notes
1980	Why Is It Always Me?	Mike	Short film; Credited as John Cusak
1983	Class	Roscoe Maybaum	
1984	Sixteen Candles	Bryce	
1984	Grandview, U.S.A.	Johnny Maine	
1985	The Sure Thing	Walter "Gib" Gibson	
1985	Better Off Dead	Lane Myer	
1985	The Journey of Natty Gann	Harry	
1986	One Crazy Summer	Hoops McCann	
1986	Stand by Me	Dennis "Denny" Lachance	
1987	Hot Pursuit	Dan Bartlett	
1987	Broadcast News	Angry Messenger	Cameo
1988	Tapeheads	Ivan Alexeev	
1988	Eight Men Out	Buck Weaver	
1989	Say Anything...	Lloyd Dobler	
1989	Fat Man and Little Boy	Michael Merriman	
1989	Elvis Stories	Corky	Short film
1990	The Grifters	Roy Dillon	
1991	True Colors	Peter Burton	
1991	Shadows and Fog	Student Jack	
1992	Roadside Prophets	Caspar	
1992	The Player	Himself	Cameo
1992	Map of the Human Heart	The Mapmaker	
1992	Bob Roberts	Cutting Edge Live Host	Cameo
1993	Money for Nothing	Joey Coyle	
1994	Floundering	J.C.	
1994	Bullets Over Broadway	David Shayne	
1994	The Road to Wellville	Charles Ossining	
1996	City Hall	Kevin Calhoun	
1997	Grosse Pointe Blank	Martin Q. Blank	Also co-writer and producer
1997	Con Air	Vince Larkin	
1997	Chicago Cab	Scary Man	
1997	Anastasia	Dimitri	Voice role
1997	Midnight in the Garden of Good and Evil	John Kelso	
1998	This Is My Father	Eddie Sharp	
1998	The Thin Red Line	Capt. John Gaff	
1999	The Jack Bull	Myrl Redding	Also executive producer
1999	Pushing Tin	Nick Falzone	
1999	Cradle Will Rock	Nelson Rockefeller	
1999	Being John Malkovich	Craig Schwartz	
2000	High Fidelity	Rob Gordon	Also co-writer and producer
2001	America's Sweethearts	Eddie Thomas	
2001	Serendipity	Jonathan Trager	
2002	Never Get Outta the Boat	—N/a	Producer only
2002	Max	Max Rothman	Also associate producer
2002	Adaptation	Himself	Uncredited cameo
2003	Identity	Edward "Ed" Dakota	
2003	Runaway Jury	Nicholas Easter	
2005	Must Love Dogs	Jake Anderson	
2005	The Ice Harvest	Charlie Arglist	
2006	The Contract	Ray Keene	Direct-to-video
2006	Buy the Ticket, Take the Ride: Hunter S. Thompson on Film	Himself	Documentary
2007	Grace Is Gone	Stanley Philipps	Also producer
2007	Joe Strummer: The Future Is Unwritten	Himself	Documentary
2007	1408	Michael "Mike" Enslin	
2007	Martian Child	David Gordon	
2008	Summerhood	Narrator	Uncredited; Voice role
2008	War, Inc.	Brand Hauser	Also co-writer and producer
2008	Igor	Igor	Voice role
2009	2012	Jackson Curtis	
2010	Hot Tub Time Machine	Adam Yates	Also producer
2010	Shanghai	Paul Soames	Direct-to-video
2012	The Raven	Edgar Allan Poe	
2012	The Paperboy	Hillary Van Wetter	
2012	The Factory	Mike Fletcher	Direct-to-video
2013	The Numbers Station	Emerson Kent	Direct-to-video
2013	The Frozen Ground	Robert Hansen	
2013	The Butler	Richard Nixon	
2013	Grand Piano	Clem	
2013	Salinger	Himself	Documentary
2013	We're No Animals	Tony Lovecraft	Also co-writer and executive producer
2013	Adult World	Rat Billings	
2014	The Bag Man	Jack	Direct-to-video
2014	Maps to the Stars	Stafford Weiss	
2014	Drive Hard	Simon Keller	Direct-to-video
2014	The Prince	Sam	Direct-to-video
2014	Love & Mercy	Brian Wilson	
2014	Reclaim	Benjamin	Direct-to-video
2014	Wall Street	Ted	Also executive producer
2015	Dragon Blade	Lucius	
2015	Hot Tub Time Machine 2	Adam Yates	Uncredited cameo in unrated version
2015	Chi-Raq	Fr. Mike Corridan	
2016	Boom Bust Boom	Himself	Documentary
2016	Cell	Clayton "Clay" Riddell	Also executive producer
2017	Arsenal	Sal	Direct-to-video
2017	Blood Money	Miller	Direct-to-video
2017	Singularity	Elias van Dorne	Direct-to-video
2018	Distorted	Vernon Sarsfield	
2018	River Runs Red	Horace	Direct-to-video
2019	Never Grow Old	Dutch Albert	
2022	Pursuit	John Calloway	Direct-to-video
2024	Decoded	Liseiwicz	
2025	Detective Chinatown 1900	Commissioner Grant	
2025	Fog of War	Robert Duncolm	

=== Television ===
Year	Title	Role	Notes
1996	Frasier	Greg	Voice role; episode: "Our Father Whose Art Ain't Heaven"
2014	Doll & Em	John	Episode: "Three"
2020	Utopia	Dr. Kevin Christie	8 episodes

== Awards and nominations ==
Year	Association	Category	Nominated work	Result
1989	Chicago Film Critics Association	Most Promising Actor	Say Anything...	Won
1999	Independent Spirit Awards	Best Male Lead	Being John Malkovich	Nominated
1999	Online Film Critics Society	Best Ensemble	Being John Malkovich	Nominated
1999	Screen Actors Guild	Outstanding Performance by a Cast in a Motion Picture	Being John Malkovich	Nominated
2000	American Comedy Awards	Funniest Actor in a Motion Picture (Leading Role)	High Fidelity	Nominated
2000	BAFTA	Best Adapted Screenplay	High Fidelity	Nominated
2000	Empire Awards	Best Actor	High Fidelity	Nominated
2000	Golden Globe Awards	Best Actor – Motion Picture Musical or Comedy	High Fidelity	Nominated
2000	Teen Choice Awards	Choice Hissy Fit	High Fidelity	Nominated
2000	University of Southern California	Scripter Award	High Fidelity	Nominated
2000	Writers Guild of America	Best Adapted Screenplay	High Fidelity	Nominated
2001	American Comedy Awards	Funniest Actor in a Motion Picture (Leading Role)	High Fidelity	Nominated
2007	Saturn Awards	Best Actor	1408	Nominated
2009	Teen Choice Awards	Choice Movie Actor – Sci-Fi	2012	Nominated
2012	Village Voice Award	Best Supporting Actor	The Paperboy	Nominated
2013	Screen Actors Guild	Outstanding Performance by a Cast in a Motion Picture	The Butler	Nominated
2014	Canadian Screen Awards	Best Performance by an Actor in a Supporting Role	Maps to the Stars	Won
