= List of POV episodes =

The following is a list of episodes from PBS series POV, a production of American Documentary, Inc. Since 1988, POV has presented over 400 independently produced documentary films to public television audiences across the country. The series began its 35th season on PBS in 2022.

== Season 1 (1988) ==
Title	Premiere	Director	Synopsis
American Tongues	July 5, 1988	Louis Alvarez and Andrew Kolker	A survey of the many dialects and accents in the American English language and the perceptions around them.
Acting Our Age	July 5, 1988	Michal Aviad	Six women between the ages of 65-75 share their thoughts on body image, sexuality, family dynamics, and mortality.
Fire From the Mountain	July 12, 1988	Deborah Shaffer	A look into Omar Cabezas' life as a student activist, to a guerrilla fighter, to ultimately finding a place in government.
Living With AIDS	July 19, 1988	Tina DiFeliciantonio	A community comes together to support a 22-year-old AIDS patient.
Knocking on Armageddon's Door	July 19, 1988	Torv Carlsen, John Magnus	Spokespeople for the survivalist movement reveal their way of thinking, the way they play, and the way they prepare for the next world war.
Rate It X	July 26, 1988	Paula de Koenigsberg	Fifteen years post the women's movement, two filmmakers survey an array of men to reveal their feelings toward women.
The Mothers of Plaza de Mayo	August 2, 1988	Susana Munoz, Lourdes Portillo	In the late 1970s, a group of Argentinian mothers staged weekly demonstrations in response to kidnappings taking place by the government to demand the release of their children.
The Good Fight	August 9, 1988	Noel Buckner, Mary Dore, Sam Sills	50 years since volunteering to go to Europe from the United States to fight the spread of fascism, participants recount their experiences as young people during those years and what has taken place since.
Metropolitan Avenue	August 16, 1988	Christine Noschese	A group of "traditional" homemakers in Brooklyn rises to the challenge to become leaders in the effort to save their community, as they combine new roles with old values in a rapidly changing society.
Louie Bluie	August 23, 1988	Terry Zwigoff	A portrait of 76-year-old Harold "Louie Bluie" Armstrong, musician, artist, raconteur and rogue.
Gates of Heaven	August 30, 1988	Errol Morris	At first, a story of pet cemeteries and their proprietors, this film takes a turn into exploring ideas of love, immorality, failure, and the American Dream.
Best Boy	September 6, 1988	Ira Wohl	Philly, a 53-year-old person with a mental disability, adapts to an independent life away from his elderly parents.

== Season 2 (1989) ==
Title	Premiere	Director	Synopsis
Who Killed Vincent Chin?	July 16, 1989	Christine Choy, Renee Tajima	Ronald Ebens fatally assaults a Chinese-American engineer during a hot summer in Detroit but never spent a day in jail after confessing, launching a look into implications of Murder in the streets of the city.
Coming Out	July 23, 1989	Ted Reed	Miss Mary Stuart Montague Price founder of the annual Debutante Cotillion in Washington, DC, shows the debutant tradition is alive and well.
Wise Guys!	July 23, 1989	David Hartwell	A stamp dealer from Los Angeles, a former school teacher form Miami, a born again Christian from Las Vegas and a whiz kid law student square off in the Jeopardy! $100,000 Tournament of Champions.
The Family Album	July 30, 1989	Alan Berliner	Alan Berliner spent years blending home movies and tape recordings collected from 60 different American families to assemble a composite lifetime which moves from childhood to adulthood, from innocence to experience.
Dark Circle	August 6, 1989	Christopher Beaver, Judy Irving, Ruth Landy	An investigation into how The Bomb is claiming the lives of everyday Americans, and the impact of the Nuclear age.
Jack Levine: Feast Of Pure Reason	August 13, 1989	David Sutherland	David Sutherland follows Social Realist painter Jack Levine on his day to day of challenging politicians, raging over social injustices, and satirizing humankind.
No Applause, Just Throw Money	August 20, 1989	Karen Goodman	On the streets and subways of New York, 101 itinerant performers whirl firesticks, mimic passers-by, imitate Stevie Wonder, tap dance and perform classical music.
Whatever Happened to Zworl Quern?	August 20, 1989	Deborah Matlovsky	Friends and family tell stories about "Zworl Quern" epithetically known as Janet Wolfe who fearlessly traveled the world in search of love, art and adventure.
Partisans Of Vilna	August 27, 1989	Aviva Kempner	The untold story of a handful of Jewish youth who organized an underground resistance against the Nazis in the Vilna Ghetto.
The Fighting Ministers	September 3, 1989	Bill Jersey, Richard Wormser	A group of ministers in Pittsburgh begin to confront the city's government and powerful corporations. Their passionate, controversial and unorthodox actions lead to profound soul-searching, Church rejection and imprisonment.
Binge	September 17, 1989	Lynn Hershman	Videomaker Lynn Hershman places herself center-screen for an intimate and humorous narrative about her efforts to control her weight.
Cowboy Poets	September 17, 1989	Kim Shelton	A portrayal of Cowboys as modern poet lariats who uphold their legacy through writings of life and the land they love.
Doug And Mike, Mike And Doug	September 17, 1989	Cindy Kleine	Cindy Kleine probes the inner and outer lives of identical twins Doug and Mike Starn, whose collaborative painting and photographic work is rapidly gaining acclaim in the art world.
Lost Angeles	September 24, 1989	Tom Seidman	An intimate look at the lives and struggles of a group of homeless people who've been moved into an "urban campground" in Los Angeles.
Girltalk	November 15, 1989	Kate Davis	A portrait of three runaway girls with histories of abuse and neglect. Music, humor, and intimate conversations play against the reality these girls' live.

== Season 3 (1990) ==
Title	Premiere	Director	Synopsis
Through the Wire	June 26, 1990	Nina Rosenblum	Three women, found guilty of nonviolent political acts in 1986, are confined to a secret underground prison in Lexington, KY as they endure perpetual light, constant surveillance, and frequent strip searches.
Police Chiefs	June 30, 1990	Alan Raymond, Susan Raymond	Crime prevention strategies vary among three city police chiefs. Daryl Gates, LAPD's SWAT pioneer; Anthony Bouza, who stirred Minneapolis; Lee P. Brown, Houston-NYC move, exhibit divergent philosophies on crime's roots and remedies.
Metamorphosis: Man Into Woman	July 3, 1990	Lisa Leeman	A 39-year-old animation artist and devout Christian, pursues a lifelong dream — to become a woman.
Larry Wright	July 10, 1990	Ari Marcopoulos, Maja Zrnic	Self-taught 14-year-old drummer Larry Wright performs on a subway platform with a plastic can as his instrument celebrating Harlem's vibrant culture.
On Ice	July 10, 1990	Grover Babcock and Andrew Takeuchi	Cryonics takes center stage in this examination of freezing humans post-mortem for potential revival.
Letter To The Next Generation	July 17, 1990	Jim Klein	Jim Klein, a former 60's radical, reevaluates this notion two decades after the Kent State incident. Collaborating with various individuals, including ex-activists-turned-professors and an ROTC captain, Klein delves into campus dynamics and societal shifts of the 90's.
Salesman	July 24, 1990	Albert Maysles, David Maysles, Charlotte Zwerin	Four door-to-door Bible salesmen navigate the delicate balance between exuberance and desolation.
Kamala And Raji	August 7, 1990	Michael Camerini	Michael Camerini captures the intricacies of everyday life in India through the narratives of two impoverished women striving to change their circumstances.
Golub	August 14, 1990	Jerry Blumenthal and Gordon Quinn	A portrait of Painter Leon Golub, renowned for thought-provoking canvases intertwining themes of media, society, responsibility, creativity, and the relationship between art and information.
Days of Waiting	August 15, 1990	Steven Okazaki	Recreated from Estell Peck Ishigo's own memoirs, photos and paintings, this film reveals the shattering relocation experience from an "outsider's" perspective of Japanese internment camps during World War II.
Going Up (TV episode)	August 21, 1990	Gary Pollard	Gary Pollard combines time-lapse photography, construction banter, and worker coordination, choreographed as he reimagines skyscraper construction as a stunning visual spectacle.
Green Streets	August 21, 1990	Maria De Luca	Maria De Luca, showcases the organic growth of community gardens in New York City. It explores how these gardens foster neighborhood pride, racial harmony, and newfound hope among passionate urban gardeners.
Motel	August 28, 1990	Christian Blackwood	Filmmaker Christian Blackwood delves into the hidden lives within three Southwest motels. Passion, loyalty, adventure, and destiny converge, revealing the essence of individuals within a distinct American subculture.
¡Teatro!	September 4, 1990	Ed Burke and Ruth Shapiro	A grassroots theater troupe brings its performances to the rugged paths of Honduras, aiming to enlighten and uplift impoverished villagers in the rural regions.
Ossian: American Boy, Tibetan Monk	September 4, 1990	Thomas R. Anderson	Ossian Maclise has spent his life in a Tibetan Buddhist monastery since age four. Remarkably, at seven, his monastic community identified him as a tulku, signifying his status as the reincarnation of a revered Tibetan lama.
People Power	September 11, 1990	Ilan Ziv	Israeli-born producer Ilan Ziv embarked on journeys to Chile, the Philippines, and the West Bank to delve into the emergence of "People Power" movements and to reevaluate his longstanding belief in the essential role of violence to overthrow oppressive regimes.

== Season 4 (1991) ==
Title	Premiere	Director
Absolutely Positive	June 18, 1991	Peter Adair
Marc and Ann	June 25, 1991	Les Blank, Maureen Gosling, Chris Simon
Plena Is Work, Plena Is Song	June 25, 1991	Pedro Rivera, Susan Zeig
Twinsburg, OH: Some Kind of Weird Twin Thing	June 25, 1991	Sue Marcoux
Honorable Nations	July 2, 1991	Chana Gazit, David Steward
Sea of Oil	July 9, 1991	M.R. Katzke
Turn Here Sweet Corn	July 9, 1991	Helen De Michiel
Chemical Valley	July 9, 1991	Mimi Pickering, Anne Lewis Johnson
Tongues Untied	July 16, 1991	Marlon Riggs
Berkeley in the Sixties	July 23, 1991	Mark Kitchell
A Little Vicious	July 30, 1991	Immy Humes
Where The Heart Roams	July 30, 1991	George Csicsery
The Big Bang	August 6, 1991	James Toback
Maria's Story	August 13, 1991	Pamela Cohen, Monona Wali, and Catherine M. Ryan
Homes Apart: The Two Koreas	August 20, 1991	Christine Choy, JT Takagi
Short Notice: A Series of Short Films	September 3, 1991	Various
Casting The First Stone	September 3, 1991	Julie Gustafson

== Season 5 (1992) ==
Title	Premiere	Director
Color Adjustment	June 15, 1992	Marlon Riggs
Intimate Stranger	June 22, 1992	Alan Berliner
Finding Christa	June 29, 1992	Camille Billops, James Hatch
Last Images of War	July 6, 1992	Stephen Olsson, Scott Andrews
The Longest Shadow	July 6, 1992	Kalina Ivanov
A Season in Hell	July 20, 1992	Walter Brock, Stephen Roszell
Promise Not to Tell	July 27, 1992	Rhea Gavry
Dream Deceivers: The Story Behind James Vance Vs. Judas Priest	August 3, 1992	David Van Taylor
Fast Food Women	August 10, 1992	Anne Lewis Johnson
Takeover	August 10, 1992	Pamela Yates and Peter Kinoy
Faith Even to the Fire	August 21, 1992	Sylvia Morales, Jean Victor
Louisiana Boys -- Raised on Politics	August 31, 1992	Louis Alvarez and Andrew Kolker, Paul Stekler
Pets or Meat	September 28, 1992	Michael Moore
Roger and Me	September 28, 1992	Michael Moore

== Season 6 (1993) ==
Title	Premiere	Director
Silverlake Life: The View From Here	June 15, 1993	Tom Joslin, Peter Friedman
Who's Going To Pay For These Donuts, Anyway?	June 22, 1993	Janice Tanaka
When Your Head's Not A Head, It's A Nut	June 29, 1993	Garth Stein
Compassion in Exile: The Life of the 14th Dalai Lama	July 6, 1993	Mickey Lemle
For Better or For Worse	July 13, 1993	David Collier
Motel	July 20, 1993	Christian Blackwood
Money Man	August 3, 1993	Philip Haas
Building Bombs: The Legacy	August 10, 1993	Mark Mori, Susan Robinson
Miami-Havana	August 17, 1993	Estela Bravo
The Women Next Door	August 24, 1993	Michal Aviad
Cousin Bobby	August 24, 1993	Jonathan Demme
Sa-I-Gu	September 10, 1993	Dai Sil Kim-Gibson, Christine Choy and Elaine Kim

== Season 7 (1994) ==
Title	Premiere	Director
Time Indefinite	June 7, 1994	Ross McElwee
One Nation Under God	June 14, 1994	Teodoro Maniaci and Francine Rzeznik
Passin' It On	June 19, 1994	Peter Miller and John Valadez
Memories of Tata	June 28, 1994	Sheldon Schiffer
The End of the Nightstick	July 5, 1994	Peter Kuttner, Cyndi Moran and Eric Scholl
The Heart of the Matter	July 12, 1994	Gini Reticker and Amber L. Hollibaugh
Escape From China	July 21, 1994	Iris F. Kung
Hearts of Darkness: A Filmmaker's Apocalypse	July 26, 1994	Fax Bahr and George Hickenlooper
Dialogues with Madwomen	August 2, 1994	Allie Light
The Times of a Sign: A Folk History of the Iran-Contra Scandal	August 9, 1994	David Goldsmith and Steven Day

== Season 8 (1995) ==
Title	Premiere	Director
Leona's Sister Gerri	June 1, 1995	Jane Gillooly
Complaints of a Dutiful Daughter	June 6, 1995	Deborah Hoffmann
No Place Like Home	June 13, 1995	Kathryn Hunt
Satya: A Prayer for the Enemy	June 14, 1995	Ellen Bruno
Out of Sight	June 20, 1995	David Sutherland
The Uprising of '34	June 25, 1995	George Stoney, Judith Helfand and Susanne Rostock
Lighting the 7th Fire	July 4, 1995	Sandra Sunrising Osawa
Twitch and Shout	July 11, 1995	Laurel Chiten
Home Economics: A Documentary of Suburbia	July 18, 1995	Jenny Cool
Dealers Among Dealers	July 25, 1995	Gaylen Ross
Carmen Miranda: Bananas is My Business	October 5, 1995	Helena Solberg

== Season 9 (1996) ==
Title	Premiere	Director
Taking on the Kennedys	May 28, 1996	Joshua Seftel
¡Palante Siempre Palante!: The Young Lords	June 1, 1996	Iris Morales
Personal Belongings	June 11, 1996	Steven Bognar
A Litany For Survival: The Life and Work of Audre Lorde	June 18, 1996	Ada Gay Griffin and Michelle Parkerson
a.k.a. Don Bonus	June 25, 1996	Spencer Nakasako and Sokly Don Bonus Ny
No Loans Today	July 2, 1996	Lisanne Skyler
The Transformation	July 9, 1996	Carlos Aparicio and Susana Aiken
The Women Outside	July 16, 1996	J.T.Orinne Takagi and Hye Jung Park
Just For The Ride	July 23, 1996	Amanda Micheli
Remembering Wei Yi-fang, Remembering Myself	July 30, 1996	Yvonne Welbon
Xich-lo (Cyclo)	July 30, 1996	M. Trinh Nguyen
Taken for a Ride	August 6, 1996	Martha Olson and Jim Klein
Maya Lin: A Strong Clear Vision	November 27, 1996	Freida Lee Mock

== Season 10 (1997) ==
Title	Premiere	Director
Nobody's Business	June 3, 1997	Alan Berliner
Battle for the Minds	June 10, 1997	Steven Lipscomb
A Healthy Baby Girl	June 17, 1997	Judith Helfand
Jesse's Gone	June 24, 1997	Michael Smith
Fear and Learning at Hoover Elementary	July 1, 1997	Laura Simon
Who is Henry Jaglom?	July 8, 1997	Alex Rubin and Jeremy Workman
In Whose Honor?	July 15, 1997	Jay Rosenstein
Girls Like Us	July 22, 1997	Jane Wagner and Tina DiFeliciantonio
Blacks and Jews	July 29, 1997	Deborah Kaufman, Bari Scott and Alan Snitow
A Perfect Candidate	August 5, 1997	R.J. Cutler and David Van Taylor

== Season 11 (1998) ==
Title	Premiere	Director
Baby It's You	June 2, 1998	Anne Makepeace
The Band	June 16, 1998	David Zeiger
Tobacco Blues	June 19, 1998	Eren McGinnis and Christine Fugate
Licensed to Kill	June 23, 1998	Arthur Dong
Kelly Loves Tony	June 30, 1998	Spencer Nakasako
If I Can't Do It	July 7, 1998	Walter Brock
Barbie Nation: An Unauthorized Tour	July 14, 1998	Susan Stern
The Vanishing Line	July 21, 1998	Maren Monsen
Sacrifice	July 28, 1998	Ellen Bruno
She Shorts	August 4, 1998	Various
Family Name	September 15, 1998	Macky Alston

== Season 12 (1999-2000) ==
Title	Premiere	Director
The Legacy: Murder & Media, Politics & Prisons	June 1, 1999	Michael J. Moore
Golden Threads	June 8, 1999	Lucy Winer and Karen Eaton
In My Corner	June 22, 1999	Ricki Stern
The Green Monster	June 29, 1999	David Finn, David Hess and A.C. Weary
Rabbit in the Moon	July 6, 1999	Emiko Omori
Corpus: A Home Movie About Selena	July 13, 1999	Lourdes Portillo
School Prayer: A Community at War	July 20, 1999	Slawomir Grünberg and Ben Crane
The Double Life of Ernesto Gomez Gomez	July 27, 1999	Catherine Ryan and Gary Weimberg
Regret To Inform	January 4, 2000	Barbara Sonneborn and Janet Cole
Well-Founded Fear	June 5, 2000	Shari Robertson and Michael Camerini

== Season 13 (2000) ==
Title	Premiere	Director
La Boda	June 27, 2000	Hannah Weyer
Butterfly	June 30, 2000	Doug Wolens
Stranger with a Camera	July 11, 2000	Elizabeth Barret
Blink	July 18, 2000	Elizabeth Thompson
Our House in Havana	July 25, 2000	Stephen Olsson
Dreamland	August 22, 2000	Lisanne Skyler
American Gypsy: A Stranger in Everybody's Land	August 29, 2000	Jasmine Dellal
KPFA On the Air	September 19, 2000	Veronica Selver and Sharon Wood
Live Free or Die	September 26, 2000	Marion Lipschutz and Rose Rosenblatt
First Person Plural	December 18, 2000	Deann Borshay Liem

== Season 14 (2001) ==
Title	Premiere	Director
Scout's Honor	June 19, 2001	Tom Shepard
The Sweetest Sound	June 26, 2001	Alan Berliner
My American Girls: A Dominican Story	July 3, 2001	Aaron Matthews
Of Civil Wrongs and Rights: The Fred Korematsu Story	July 10, 2001	Eric Paul Fournier
True-Hearted Vixens	July 17, 2001	Mylène Moreno
Take It From Me	July 24, 2001	Emily Abt
In the Light of Reverence	August 14, 2001	Christopher McLeod
Life and Debt	August 21, 2001	Stephanie Black
High School	August 28, 2001	Frederick Wiseman
5 Girls	October 2, 2001	Maria Finitzo
Promises	December 13, 2001	B. Z. Goldberg and Justine Shapiro

== Season 15 (2002-03) ==
Title	Premiere	Director
The Smith Family	June 25, 2002	Tasha Oldham
Boomtown	July 2, 2002	Bryan Gunnar Cole
Hybrid	July 9, 2002	Monteith McCollum
Refrigerator Mothers	July 16, 2002	David E. Simpson, J.J. Hanley and Gordon Quinn
Fenceline: A Company Town Divided	July 23, 2002	Slawomir Grünberg and Jane Greenberg
Sweet Old Song	July 30, 2002	Leah Mahan
Mai's America	August 6, 2002	Marlo Poras
Señorita Extraviada	August 20, 2002	Lourdes Portillo
Escuela	August 27, 2002	Hannah Weyer
Afghanistan Year 1380	September 9, 2002	Fabrizio Lazzaretti and Alberto Vendemmiati and Giuseppe Petitto
Two Towns of Jasper	January 22, 2003	Whitney Dow and Marco Williams

== Season 16 (2003-04) ==
Title	Premiere	Director
Brother Outsider: The Life of Bayard Rustin	January 20, 2003	Nancy Kates and Bennett Singer
Flag Wars	June 17, 2003	Linda Goode Bryant and Linda Poitras
Georgie Girl	June 20, 2003	Annie Goldson and Peter Wells
Larry v. Lockney	July 1, 2003	Mark Birnbaum and Jim Schermbeck
Discovering Dominga	July 8, 2003	Patricia Flynn and Mary Jo McConahay
The Flute Player	July 22, 2003	Jocelyn Glatzer
90 Miles	July 29, 2003	Juan Carlos Zaldívar
American Aloha: Hula Beyond Hawaiʻi	August 5, 2003	Lisette Marie Flanary and Evann Siebens
West 47th Street	August 19, 2003	Bill Lichtenstein and June Peoples
Family Fundamentals	August 26, 2003	Arthur Dong
The Sixth Section	September 2, 2003	Alex Rivera
Soldados: Chicanos in Viet Nam	September 2, 2003	Charley Trujillo and Sonya Rhee
State of Denial	September 16, 2003	Elaine Epstein
What I Want My Words To Do To You	December 16, 2003	Madeleine Gavin, Judith Katz and Gary Sunshine
Love & Diane	April 21, 2004	Jennifer Dworkin

== Season 17 (2004-05) ==
Title	Premiere	Director
Farmingville	June 22, 2004	Carlos Sandoval and Catherine Tambini
Bill's Run: A Political Journey in Rural Kansas	June 29, 2004	Richard Kassebaum
War Feels Like War	July 6, 2004	Esteban Uyarra
Thirst	July 13, 2004	Alan Snitow and Deborah Kaufman
Last Man Standing: Politics Texas Style	July 20, 2004	Paul Stekler
A Family Undertaking	August 3, 2004	Elizabeth Westrate
Every Mother's Son	August 17, 2004	Tami Gold and Kelly Anderson
Speedo: A Demolition Derby Love Story	August 24, 2004	Jesse Moss
Wattstax	September 7, 2004	Mel Stuart
Freedom Machines	September 14, 2004	Jamie Stoble and Janet Cole
A Panther in Africa	September 21, 2004	Aaron Matthews
Lost Boys of Sudan	September 28, 2004	Megan Mylan and Jon Shenk

== Season 18 (2005) ==
Title	Premiere	Director
Chisholm '72: Unbought & Unbossed	February 7, 2005	Shola Lynch
The Education of Shelby Knox	June 21, 2005	Marion Lipschutz and Rose Rosenblatt
Big Enough	June 28, 2005	Jan Krawitz
Street Fight	July 5, 2005	Marshall Curry
The Fire Next Time	July 12, 2005	Patrice O'Neill
The Brooklyn Connection	July 19, 2005	Klaartje Quirijns
The Self-Made Man	July 26, 2005	Susan Stern
In the Realms of the Unreal	August 2, 2005	Jessica Yu
A Thousand Words	August 16, 2005	Melba Williams
Hardwood	August 16, 2005	Hubert Davis
I Used to Be a Filmmaker	August 16, 2005	Jay Rosenblatt
A Song for Daniel	August 23, 2005	Jason DaSilva
Bright Leaves	August 23, 2005	Ross McElwee
Hiding and Seeking	August 30, 2005	Oren Rudavsky and Menachem Daum
The Hobart Shakespeareans	September 6, 2005	Mel Stuart
Omar & Pete	September 13, 2005	Tod Lending

== Season 19 (2006) ==
Title	Premiere	Director
No More Tears Sister	June 27, 2006	Helene Klodawsky
Kokoyakyu: High School Baseball	July 4, 2006	Kenneth Eng
Tintin and I	July 11, 2006	Anders Østergaard
The Fall of Fujimori	July 18, 2006	Ellen Perry
The Tailenders	July 25, 2006	Adele Horne
Al Otro Lado (To the Other Side)	August 1, 2006	Natalia Almada
Lomax the Songhunter	August 22, 2006	Rogier Kappers
Waging a Living	August 29, 2006	Roger Weisberg
The Boys of Baraka	September 12, 2006	Heidi Ewing and Rachel Grady
Twelve Disciples of Nelson Mandela	September 19, 2006	Thomas Allen Harris
No Bigger Than a Minute	October 3, 2006	Steven Delano
Maquilapolis	October 10, 2006	Vicky Funari & Sergio De La Torre
My Country, My Country	October 25, 2006	Laura Poitras

== Season 20 (2007-08) ==
Title	Premiere	Director
Rain in a Dry Land	June 19, 2007	Anne Makepeace
Massacre at Murambi	June 26, 2007	Sam Kauffman
Sierra Leone's Refugee All Stars	June 27, 2007	Banker White and Zach Niles
Standing Silent Nation	July 3, 2007	Suree Towfighnia and Courtney Hermann
Revolution '67	July 10, 2007	Marylou Tibaldo-Bongiorno
Lawn	July 11, 2006	Monteith McCollum
The Chances of the World Changing	July 17, 2007	Eric Daniel Metzgar & Nell Carden Grey
Prison Town, USA	July 24, 2007	Katie Galloway and Po Kutchins
No Angels in the Outfield	July 24, 2007	Larry Warner
Following Sean	July 31, 2007	Ralph Arlyck
Alice Sees the Light	August 21, 2007	Ariana Gerstein
Arctic Son	August 21, 2007	Andrew Walton
Libby, Montana	August 28, 2007	Doug Hawes-Davis and Drury Gunn Carr
Made in L.A.	September 4, 2007	Almudena Carracedo and Robert Bahar
Keeping House	September 4, 2007	May Lin Au Yong
Bullet Proof Vest	September 4, 2007	May Lin Au Yong
The Camden 28	September 11, 2007	Anthony Giacchino
Lumo	September 18, 2007	Bent-Jorgen Perlmutt and Nelson Walker III, Co-directed by Louis Abelman and Lynn True
49 Up	October 9, 2007	Michael Apted
Wrestling With Angels: Playwright Tony Kushner	December 12, 2007	Freida Lee Mock
Scaredycat	December 12, 2007	Andy Blubaugh

== Season 21 (2008) ==
Title	Premiere	Director
Ars Magna	March 1, 2008	Cory Kelley
Traces of the Trade: A Story from the Deep North	June 24, 2008	Katrina Browne
Election Day	July 1, 2008	Katy Chevigny
The Ballad of Esequiel Hernandez	July 8, 2008	Kieran Fitzgerald
The Last Conquistador	July 15, 2008	John J. Valadez and Cristina Ibarra
9 Star Hotel	July 22, 2008	Ido Haar
Campaign	July 29, 2008	Kazuhiro Soda
Johnny Cash! The Man, His World, His Music	August 5, 2008	Robert Elfstrom
Belarusian Waltz	August 12, 2008	Andrzej Fidyk
The Judge and the General	August 19, 2008	Elizabeth Farnsworth & Patricio Lanfranco
Calavera Highway	September 16, 2008	Renee Tajima-Pena & Evangeline Griego
Critical Condition	September 30, 2008	Roger Weisberg
In the Family	October 1, 2008	Joanna Rudnick
Up the Yangtze	October 8, 2008	Yung Chang
Soldiers of Conscience	October 16, 2008	Gary Weimberg and Catherine Ryan
City of Cranes	December 10, 2008	Eva Weber
Inheritance	December 10, 2008	James Moll

== Season 22 (2009-2010) ==
Title	Premiere	Director
New Muslim Cool	June 23, 2009	Jennifer Maytorena Taylor
Beyond Hatred	June 30, 2009	Olivier Meyrou
Life. Support. Music.	July 7, 2009	Eric Daniel Metzgar
The Reckoning: The Battle for the International Criminal Court	July 14, 2009	Paco de Onis, Peter Kinoy and Pamela Yates
The Betrayal (Nerakhoon)	July 21, 2009	Ellen Kuras & Thavisouk Phrasavath
Hold Me Tight, Let Me Go	July 28, 2009	Kim Longinotto
Nutkin's Last Stand	August 18, 2009	Nicholas Berger
34x25x36	August 18, 2009	Jesse Epstein
Utopia, Part 3: The World's Largest Shopping Mall	August 18, 2009	Sam Green and Carrie Lozano
This Way Up	August 25, 2009	Georgi Lazarevski
Ella Es el Matador (She Is the Matador)	September 1, 2009	Gemma Cubero and Celeste Carrasco
The English Surgeon	September 8, 2009	Geoffrey Smith
The Principal Story	September 15, 2009	Tod Lending and David Mrazek
Jennifer	September 22, 2009	Stewart Copeland
So the Wind Won't Blow It All Away	September 22, 2009	Annie P. Waldman
Bronx Princess	September 22, 2009	Yoni Brook and Musa Syeed
The Way We Get By	November 11, 2009	Aron Gaudet and Gita Pullapilly
Patti Smith: Dream of Life	December 30, 2009	Steven Sebring

== Season 23 (2010) ==
Title	Premiere	Director
Food, Inc.	April 21, 2010	Robert Kenner
Notes on Milk	April 21, 2010	Ariana Gerstein and Monteith McCollum
William Kunstler: Disturbing the Universe	June 22, 2010	Emily Kunstler and Sarah Kunstler
The Beaches of Agnès	June 29, 2010	Agnès Varda
A Different Color Blue	June 29, 2010	Melanie Vi Levy
Promised Land	July 6, 2010	Yoruba Richen
Good Fortune	July 13, 2010	Landon Van Soest and Jeremy Levine
Bye	July 13, 2010	Anthony Morrison
El General	July 20, 2010	Natalia Almada
Presumed Guilty	July 27, 2010	Roberto Hernández, Layda Negrete and Geoffrey Smith
A Healing Art	August 17, 2010	Ellen Frick
The Archive	August 17, 2010	Sean Dunne
Salt	August 17, 2010	Michael Angus and Murray Fredericks
Trash-Out	August 17, 2010	Maria Fortiz-Morse
Danny and Annie: Parts I & II	August 17, 2010	Mike Rauch and Tim Rauch
Q&A	August 24, 2010	Mike Rauch and Tim Rauch
Seltzer Works	August 24, 2010	Jessica Edwards
The Edge of Dreaming	August 24, 2010	Amy Hardie
Wo Ai Ni (I Love You) Mommy	August 31, 2010	Stephanie Wang-Breal
Germans in the Woods	August 31, 2010	Mike Rauch and Tim Rauch
Off and Running	September 7, 2010	Nicole Opper
The Human Voice	September 7, 2010	Mike Rauch and Tim Rauch
The Icing on the Cake	September 7, 2010	Mike Rauch and Tim Rauch
In the Matter of Cha Jung Hee	September 14, 2010	Deann Borshay Liem
The Oath	September 21, 2010	Laura Poitras
The Most Dangerous Man in America: Daniel Ellsberg and the Pentagon Papers	October 5, 2010	Judith Ehrlich and Rick Goldsmith

== Season 24 (2011-12) ==
Title	Premiere	Director
Kings of Pastry	June 21, 2011	Chris Hegedus & D. A. Pennebaker
My Perestroika	June 28, 2011	Robin Hessman
Sweetgrass	July 5, 2011	Ilisa Barbash & Lucien Castaing-Taylor
Enemies of the People	July 12, 2011	Rob Lemkin and Thet Sambath
Biblioburro: The Donkey Library	July 19, 2011	Carlos Rendón Zipagauta
Mugabe and the White African	July 26, 2011	Lucy Bailey and Andrew Thompson
Steam of Life	August 2, 2011	Joonas Berghäll and Mika Hotakainen
Flawed	August 23, 2011	Andrea Dorfman
Miss Devine	August 23, 2011	Mike Rauch and Tim Rauch
Big Birding Day	August 23, 2011	David Wilson
Tiffany	August 23, 2011	Alix Lambert
No More Questions!	August 23, 2011	Mike Rauch and Tim Rauch
Six Weeks	August 23, 2011	Marcin Janos Krawczyk
Armadillo	August 30, 2011	Janus Metz
Better This World	September 6, 2011	Kelly Duane de la Vega and Katie Galloway
StoryCorps Shorts: September 11 Stories	September 6, 2011	Mike Rauch and Tim Rauch
If a Tree Falls: A Story of the Earth Liberation Front	September 13, 2011	Marshall Curry
The Learning	September 20, 2011	Ramona Diaz
Last Train Home	September 27, 2011	Lixin Fan
Where Soldiers Come From	November 10, 2011	Heather Courtney
Racing Dreams	February 23, 2012	Marshall Curry

== Season 25 (2012-13) ==
Title	Premiere	Director
To R.P. Salazar, with Love	January 26, 2012	Mike Rauch and Tim Rauch
My Reincarnation	June 21, 2012	Jennifer Fox
Granito: How to Nail a Dictator	June 28, 2012	Peter Kinoy, Pamela Yates and Paco de Onís
The City Dark	July 5, 2012	Ian Cheney
Guilty Pleasures	July 12, 2012	Julie Moggan
The Light in Her Eyes	July 19, 2012	Julia Meltzer and Laura Nix
Up Heartbreak Hill	July 26, 2012	Erica Scharf
The Barber of Birmingham	August 9, 2012	Gail Dolgin and Robin Fryday
Sin País	August 9, 2012	Theo Rigby
Eyes on the Stars	August 9, 2012	Mike Rauch and Tim Rauch
Facundo the Great	August 9, 2012	Mike Rauch and Tim Rauch
A Family Man	August 9, 2012	Mike Rauch and Tim Rauch
I'm Carolyn Parker: The Good, the Mad, and the Beautiful	September 20, 2012	Jonathan Demme
El Velador (The Night Watchman)	September 27, 2012	Natalia Almada
Give Up Tomorrow	October 4, 2012	Michael Collins and Marty Syjuco
Sun Kissed	October 18, 2012	Maya Stark and Adi Lavy
Nostalgia for the Light	October 25, 2012	Patricio Guzmán
Reportero	January 7, 2013	Bernardo Ruiz
Girl Model	March 24, 2013	A. Sabin and David Redmon

== Season 26 (2013-14) ==
Title	Premiere	Director
Homegoings	June 24, 2013	Christine Turner
Special Flight (French: Vol spécial)	July 1, 2013	Fernand Melgar
Herman's House	July 8, 2013	Angad Singh Bhalla
Only the Young	July 15, 2013	Jason Tippett and Elizabeth Mims
High Tech, Low Life	July 22, 2013	Stephen Maing
Neurotypical	July 29, 2013	Adam Larsen
The Law in These Parts	August 19, 2013	and Liran Atzmor
5 Broken Cameras	August 26, 2013	Emad Burnat and Guy Davidi
Ping Pong	September 9, 2013	Hugh Hartford and Anson Hartford
The World Before Her	September 16, 2013	Nisha Pahuja
Best Kept Secret	September 23, 2013	Samantha Buck
Brooklyn Castle	October 7, 2013	Katie Dellamaggiore
56 Up	October 14, 2013	Michael Apted
Listening Is an Act of Love: A StoryCorps Special	November 28, 2013	StoryCorps by Mike Rauch and Tim Rauch
American Promise	February 3, 2014	Joe Brewster and Michèle Stephenson

== Season 27 (2014) ==
Title	Premiere	Director
When I Walk	June 23, 2014	Jason DaSilva
American Revolutionary: The Evolution of Grace Lee Boggs	June 30, 2014	Grace Lee
My Way to Olympia	July 7, 2014	Niko von Glasow
Getting Back to Abnormal	July 14, 2014	Louis Alvarez, Andrew Kolker, Peter Odabashian and Paul Stekler
Dance for Me	July 21, 2014	Katrine Philp
A Good Man	July 21, 2014	by StoryCorps and Mike Rauch and Tim Rauch
Fallen City	July 28, 2014	Qi Zhao
15 to Life: Kenneth's Story	August 4, 2014	Nadine Pequeneza
A World Not Ours	August 18, 2014	Mahdi Fleifel
Big Men	August 25, 2014	Rachel Boynton
After Tiller	September 1, 2014	Martha Shane and Lana Wilson
The Genius of Marian	September 8, 2014	Banker White and Anna Fitch
Koch	September 22, 2014	Neil Barsky
The Act of Killing	October 6, 2014	Joshua Oppenheimer

== Season 28 (2015) ==
Title	Premiere	Director
Out in the Night	June 22, 2015	blair dorosh-walther
The Overnighters	June 29, 2015	Jesse Moss
Tough Love	July 6, 2015	Stephanie Wang-Breal
Web Junkie	July 13, 2015	Shosh Shlam, Hilla Medalia
The Return to Homs	July 20, 2015	Talal Derki
Tea Time	July 27, 2015	Maite Alberdi
Beats of the Antonov	August 3, 2015	Hajooj Kuka
Neuland	August 17, 2015	Anna Thommen
Point and Shoot	August 24, 2015	Marshall Curry
The Storm Makers	August 31, 2015	Guillaume Suon
Cutie and the Boxer	September 18, 2015	Zachary Heinzerling
Don't Tell Anyone (No Le Digas a Nadie)	September 21, 2015	Mikaela Shwer
Art and Craft	September 25, 2015	Sam Cullman, Jennifer Grausman; co-directed by Mark Becker
Ai Weiwei: The Fake Case	October 2, 2015	Andreas Johnsen

== Season 29 (2016) ==
Title	Premiere	Director
The Return	May 23, 2016	Kelly Duane de la Vega, Katie Galloway
Of Men and War	May 30, 2016	Laurent Bécue-Renard
The Look of Silence	June 27, 2016	Joshua Oppenheimer
Pervert Park	July 11, 2016	Frida Barkfors, Lasse Barkfors
Iris	August 1, 2016	Albert Maysles
The Birth of Saké	September 5, 2016	Erik Shirai
All the Difference	September 12, 2016	Tod Lending
Kingdom of Shadows	September 19, 2016	Bernardo Ruiz
Marathon (short)	September 19, 2016	Theo Rigby, Kate McLean
From This Day Forward	October 10, 2016	Sharon Shattuck
Pink Boy (short)	October 10, 2016	Eric Rockey
Hooligan Sparrow	October 17, 2016	Nanfu Wang
Thank You for Playing	October 24, 2016	David Osit, Malika Zouhali-Worrall
What Tomorrow Brings	October 31, 2016	Beth Murphy
Seven Songs for a Long Life	January 30, 2017	Amy Hardie

== Season 30 (2017-18) ==
Title	Premiere	Director
Dalya's Other Country	June 26, 2017	Julia Meltzer
4.1 Miles (short)	June 26, 2017	Daphne Matziaraki
The War Show	July 3, 2017	Obaidah Zytoon, Andreas Dalsgaard
Last Men in Aleppo	July 10, 2017	Firas Fayyad, Steven Johannessen
Presenting Princess Shaw	July 17, 2017	Ido Haar
Shalom Italia	July 24, 2017	Tamar Tal Anati
Joe's Violin (short)	July 24, 2017	Kahane Cooperman, Raphaela Neilhausen
Memories of a Penitent Heart	July 31, 2017	Cecilia Aldarondo
Tribal Justice	August 21, 2017	Anne Makepeace
Raising Bertie	August 28, 2017	Margaret Byrne
The Grown-Ups	September 4, 2017	Maite Alberdi
My Love, Don't Cross That River	September 11, 2017	Jin Mo-young
Swim Team	October 2, 2017	Lara Stolman
The Islands and The Whales	October 9, 2017	Mike Day
Motherland	October 16, 2017	Ramona S. Diaz
Cameraperson	October 23, 2017	Kirsten Johnson
Almost Sunrise	November 13, 2017	Michael Collins & Marty Syjuco

== Season 31 (2018-19) ==
Title	Premiere	Director
Bill Nye: Science Guy	April 18, 2018	David Alvarado and Jason Sussberg
Quest	June 18, 2018	Jonathan Olshefski
Singing with Angry Bird	June 25, 2018	Hyewon Jee
Brimstone & Glory	July 2, 2018	Viktor Jakovleski
The Workers Cup	July 9, 2018	Adam Sobel
Beatrice (short)	July 23, 2018	Lorena Alvarado
Lindy Lou, Juror Number 2	July 16, 2018	Florent Vassault
The War to Be Her	July 23, 2018	Erin Heidenreich
Whose Streets?	July 30, 2018	Sabaah Folayan, Damon Davis
Still Tomorrow	August 6, 2018	Jian Fan
Nowhere to Hide	August 27, 2018	Zaradasht Ahmed
Voices of the Sea	September 3, 2018	Kim Hopkins
93Queen	September 17, 2018	Paula Eiselt
Survivors	September 24, 2018	Anna Fitch, Lansana Mansaray, Arthur Pratt, Banker White
Dark Money	October 1, 2018	Kimberly Reed
The Apology	October 22, 2018	Tiffany Hsiung
Minding the Gap	February 18, 2019	Bing Liu
306 Hollywood	March 18, 2019	Elan Bogarín, Jonathan Bogarín
Wendy's Shabbat (short)	March 18, 2019	Rachel Myers
116 Cameras (short)	March 18, 2019	Davina Pardo

== Season 32 (2019-2020) ==
Title	Premiere	Director
Roll Red Roll	June 17, 2019	Nancy Schwartzman
The Gospel of Eureka	June 24, 2019	Donal Mosher, Michael Palmieri
Call Her Ganda	July 1, 2019	PJ Raval
Bisbee '17	July 15, 2019	Robert Greene
On Her Shoulders	July 22, 2019	Alexandria Bombach
Inventing Tomorrow	July 29, 2019	Laura Nix
The Distant Barking of Dogs	August 5, 2019	Simon Lereng Wilmont
Happy Winter	August 12, 2019	Giovanni Totaro
Farmsteaders	September 2, 2019	Shaena Mallett
Grit	September 9, 2019	Cynthia Wade, Sasha Friedlander
The Silence of Others	September 30, 2019	Robert Bahar, Almudena Carracedo
América	October 7, 2019	Chase Whiteside, Erick Stoll
The Feeling of Being Watched	October 14, 2019	Assia Boundaoui
BLOWIN' UP	October 21, 2019	Stephanie Wang-Breal
Midnight Traveler	December 30, 2019	Hassan Fazili
The Rescue List	March 23, 2020	Alyssa Fedele, Zachary Fink

== Season 33 (2020-21) ==
Title	Premiere	Director
And She Could Be Next	June 29, 2020	Grace Lee, Marjan Safinia
We Are the Radical Monarchs	July 20, 2020	Linda Goldstein Knowlton
Advocate	July 27, 2020	Rachel Leah Jones, Philippe Bellaïche
Chez Jolie Coiffure	August 3, 2020	Rosine Mbakam
About Love	August 10, 2020	Archana Atul Phadke
Portraits and Dreams	September 7, 2020	Wendy Ewald, Elizabeth Barret
Love Child	September 14, 2020	Eva Mulvad
In My Blood It Runs	September 21, 2020	Maya Newell
Our Time Machine	September 28, 2020	Yang Sun, S. Leo Chiang
The Infiltrators	October 5, 2020	Cristina Ibarra, Alex Rivera
Softie	October 12, 2020	Sam Soko
The Mole Agent	January 25, 2021	Maite Alberdi
Through the Night	May 10, 2021	Loira Limbal

== Season 34 (2021-22) ==
Title	Premiere	Director	Synopsis
The Neutral Ground	July 5, 2021	CJ Hunt	CJ Hunt examines the relevance of a 1865 losing army's impact on America
Landfall	July 12, 2021	Cecilia Aldarondo	Glimpse of Puerto Rico's reality and collective resistance post-Hurricane Maria
Stateless	July 19, 2021	Michèle Stephenson	An attorney advocates for Haitian Dominicans' right to citizenship .
Mayor	July 26, 2021	David Osit	How will a mayor run a city if he doesn't have a country?
Pier Kids	August 2, 2021	Elegance Bratton	Christopher Street Pier is a mecca for New York City's queer and trans youth of color
The Song Of The Butterflies	August 30, 2021	Nuria Frigola Torrent	Rember, an Indigenours artist travels back to his Amazonian roots
Fruits of Labor	October 4, 2021	Emily Cohen Ibañez	A Mexican American teenager has to be the breadwinner when ICE threatens her family
La Casa de Mama Icha	October 18, 2021	Oscar Molina	At the end of her life, Mama Icha returns to Columbia after decades in the US
Things We Dare Not Do	October 25, 2021	Bruno Santamaría	
North By Current	November 1, 2021	Angelo Madsen Minax	Director Angelo Madsen Minax goes back to his hometown in rural Michigan following the passing of his niece
Unapologetic	December 27, 2021	Ashley O'Shay	In the wake of two police killings, Black abolitionists hold Chicago officials responsible
Not Going Quietly	January 24, 2022	Nicholas Bruckman	A national healthcare movement is launched by Ady Barkan after he is diagnosed with ALS.
On The Divide	Spring 2022	Maya Cueva, Leah Galant	Three Latinx individuals' lives converge at the abortion clinic on the border.

== Season 35 (2022-23) ==
Title	Premiere	Director	Synopsis
Who Killed Vincent Chin	June 20, 2022	Christine Choy; Renee Tajima-Peña	An in-depth exploration of murder of Vincent Chin in 1982.
Wuhan Wuhan	July 11, 2022	Yung Chang	Citizens in the city of Wuhan unite to grapple with a new virus called COVID-19.
Manzanar, Diverted: When Water Becomes Dust	July 18, 2022	Ann Kaneko	Native Americans, Japanese Americans, and environmentalists in Northern California are all connected to the water owned by Los Angeles.
Winter's Yearning	July 25, 2022	Sidse Torstholm Larsen, Sturla Pilskog	A US company challenges Greenland's colonial past and propitious future
He's My Brother	August 1, 2022	Cille Hannibal, Co-director: Christine Hanberg	A sister tries to secure a life of dignity for her brother, who was born with multiple disabilities?
President	August 8, 2022	Camilla Nielsson	A new leader challenges the leading party in the 2018 presidential election in Zimbabwe
Faya Dayi	August 29, 2022	Jessica Beshir (Director/Producer)	An exploration of Harar, in Ethiopia, where the euphoria-inducing plant khat reigns supreme.
Love & Stuff	September 5, 2022	Judith Helfand; Co-director: David Cohen	A multigenerational story that explores the question "How do you live without your mother?"
Delikado	September 26, 2022	Karl Malakunas	Locals unite at a tropical paradise and endanger their safety to defend the last ecological frontier in the Philippines.
The Last Out	October 3, 2022	Michael Gassert, Sami Khan	To pursue their dreams of playing in the US major leagues, three Cuban baseball players take the risk of exile.
Accepted	October 10, 2022	Dan Chen	A Louisiana prep school that guarantees 100% of its grads to college is faced with a national scandal
An Act of Worship	August 8, 2022	Camilla Nielsson	A collective momory and an alternative viewpoint of the American Muslim life over the last 30 years
Midwives	November 21, 2022	Snow Hnin Ei Hlaing	Two women run a makeshift medical clinic despite ethnic conflict.
Let the Little Light Shine	December 12, 2022	Kevin Shaw	An academic hub for Black children resist against gentrification.
I Didn't See You There	January 9, 2023	Reid Davenport	A filmmaker with disabilities reflects on the impact of the Freak Show legacy.

== Season 36 (2023-24) ==
Title	Premiere	Director	Synopsis
After Sherman	June 26, 2023	Jon-Sesrie Goff	An investigation in coastal South Carolina explores Black inheritance, trauma, and wisdom.
A Story of Bones	July 3, 2023	Joseph Curran, Dominic Aubrey de Vere	A burial site of formerly enslaved Africans is discovered on St. Helena.
Liquor Store Dreams	July 10, 2023	So Yun Um	Immigrant dreams and generational divides clash against LA's landscape.
A House Made of Splinters	July 17, 2023	Simon Lereng Wilmont	Near the frontlines of Eastern Ukraine, social workers create a safe haven for kids in limbo.
Eat Your Catfish	July 24, 2023	Adam Isenberg, Noah Amir Arjomand, Senem Tüzen	A portrait of a woman with ALS and her family.
Children of the Mist	July 31, 2023	Hà Lệ Diễm	In rural Northern Vietnam, a Hmong girl is caught between tradition and modernity.
While We Watched	September 4, 2023	Vinay Shukla	Journalist Ravish Kumar stands his ground in a world of "fake news."
Bulls & Saints	September 18, 2023	Rodrigo Dorfman	An undocumented family decides to return home after two decades of living in the US.
Uýra: The Rising Forest	September 25, 2023	Juliana Curi	In the Amazon forest, Uýra is a trans-indigenous artist on a journey of self-discovery.
Murders That Matter	October 2, 2023	Marco Williams	A mother transforms from a victim of trauma into an advocate against gun violence in Black communities.
Aurora's Sunrise	October 23, 2023	Inna Sahakyan	After she survives a genocide, a teenage girl makes a rise to Hollywood stardom.
Fire Through Dry Grass	October 30, 2023	Andres "Jay" Molina	A group of nursing home residents document their lives on lockdown during Covid and kickstart a movement.
Wisdom Gone Wild	November 20, 2023	Rea Tajiri	A woman with dementia reinvents herself.
How To Have An American Baby	December 11, 2023	Leslie Tai	A voyage into the Chinese birth tourism industry in the US.
Brief Tender Light	January 15, 2024	Arthur Musah	A Ghanaian MIT alum follows four African students at his alma mater as they try to make change back home.
unseen	March 18, 2024	Set Hernandez	A blind, undocumented immigrant, and an aspiring social worker confront life.

== Season 37 (2024-25) ==
Title	Premiere	Director	Synopsis
King Coal	June 6, 2024	Elaine McMillion Sheldon	The history of coal mining and the modern impact on the people of central appalachia.
Hummingbirds	July 1, 2024	Estefanía "Beba" Contreras, Silvia Del Carmen Castaños	Two filmmakers document their life during one summer in Laredo, Texas.
Is There Anybody Out There?	July 8, 2024	Ella Bee Glendining	The filmmaker chronicles her life with a rare condition that causes her to confront ableism.
Against the Tide	July 29, 2024	Sarvnik Kaur	Two fishermen from Mumbai facing the challenges caused by climate change.
Fauna	August 5, 2024	Pau Faus	An aging shepherd outside Barcelona tends to his flock near a high-tech laboratory that uses animal experimentation.
Name Me Lawand	September 9, 2024	Edward Lovelace	Follow a young, deaf Kurdish man's recent move to the United Kingdom and as they learn British Sign Language at the Royal School for the Deaf in Derby.
Who's Afraid of Nathan Law?	September 23, 2024	Joe Piscatella	Profile of Nathan Law, one of the lead organizers of the pro-democracy Umbrella Movement in Hong Kong, when he was elected to serve as a legislator. A follow-up to Joshua: Teenager vs. Superpower, a film by the same director covering earlier activities by the same group.
In the Rearview	October 7, 2024	Maciek Hamela	The filmmaker in a van, traverses the roads of Ukraine with evacuated people, following the Russian invasion.
Twice Colonized	October 14, 2024	Lin Alluna	Profiles Aaju Peter, an Inuk lawyer and activist who has lived in both Greenland and Nunavut.
Tokyo Uber Blues	October 21, 2024	Taku Aoyagi	The filmmaker documents his work life as gig worker doing food delivery in Tokyo.
The Body Politic	November 25, 2024	Gabriel Francis, Paz Goodenough	Follow Mayor of Baltimore Brandon Scott during his first year in office as he addresses violence in the city.
Who I am Not	December 30, 2024	Tünde Skovrán	Two South African friends, both born intersex, are challenged by gender dysphoria. One a beauty queen and the other an activist provide mutual support.
Break the Game	April 7, 2025	Jane M. Wagner	Narcissa Wright, online gamer, breaks records on Legend of Zelda while live streaming and finds love in the digital age.
The Taste of Mango	April 28, 2025	Chloe Abrahams	The filmmaker documents generational trauma with interviews of her mother and grandmother.

== Season 38 (2025-26) ==
Title	Premiere	Director	Synopsis
Union	June 23, 2025	Brett Story, Stephen Maing	A group of workers comes together to unionize against the corporate entity, Amazon.
Igualada: Refusing to Know Your Place	July 7, 2025	Juan Mejía Botero	A Black Colombian womans pursuit of the presidency sparks a national confrontation.
Made in Ethiopia	July 14, 2025	Xinyan Yu, Max Duncan	As a Chinese industrial zone alters an Ethiopian community, three women navigate the changing landscape.
The Ride Ahead	July 21, 2025	Samuel Habib and Dan Habib	A group of disability activists guides Samuel Habib on the path to adulthood.
Maya Lin: A Strong Clear Vision	July 22, 2025	Freida Lee Mock	Watch the controversy behind the Vietnam Veterans Memorial created by Maya Lin.
Emergent City	August 18, 2025	Kelly Anderson, Jay Arthur Sterrenberg	Local democracy is tested in a divided Brooklyn community coined as a "innovation district".
A New Kind of Wilderness	August 25, 2025	Silje Evensmo Jacobsen	When tragedy strikes a family must transition into modern society, a stark difference from their former life in nature.
Driver	September 1, 2025	Nesa Azimi	Desiree Woods gives herself a second chance on life as a truck driver.
Age of Water	September 8, 2025	Isabel Alcántara Atalaya, Alfredo Alcántara	A community in Mexico seeks answers about their water, revealing new truths.
Black Snow	September 15, 2025	Alina Simone	A journey that reveals the human cost of coal.
The Bitter Pill	September 22, 2025	Clay Tweel	An attorney in a small town fights a pharmaceutical giant bringing opioids.
Porcelain War	September 29, 2025	Brendan Bellomo, Slava Leontyev	In an effort to confront war, Ukrainian artists turn to art.
A Mother Apart	October 13, 2025	Laurie Townshend	Staceyann Chin takes us on a journey of healing, forgiveness, and mothering.
Between Goodbyes	December 8, 2025	Jota Mun	A Korean birth mother and her daughter attempt to reunite for the long haul.
