= Coming to You =

2021 South Korean documentary film

- 너에게 가는 길
- Directed by: Byun Gyuri
- Written by: Byun Gyuri
- Produced by: Lee Hyuksang; Nungcool; Her Yoon-soo
- Starring: Eunae "Nabi" Jeong; Sunhwa "Vivian" Kang; Hankyeol Lee; Yejoon Joung
- Cinematography: Byun Gyuri; Han Younghee; Kim Jung-geun; Kim Hyoung-ju
- Edited by: Kim Il-rhan
- Distributed by: Film Movement (international)
- Release date: April 29, 2021 (Jeonju International Film Festival)
- Running time: 93 minutes
- Country: South Korea
- Language: Korean

Coming to You (Korean: 너에게 가는 길) is a 2021 South Korean documentary film written and directed by Byun Gyuri. The film follows two South Korean mothers whose children come out as transgender and gay, respectively, and documents their responses, family relationships, and later involvement in LGBTQ+ advocacy. It was produced by PINKS, an influential queer feminist media group based in South Korea and distributed internationally by Film Movement.

The film won the Documentary Award and received a Special Mention in the Korean Competition at the 22nd Jeonju International Film Festival (2021), and also won the Brave New Docs Award at the DMZ International Documentary Film Festival.

== Synopsis ==
Coming to You follows two South Korean mothers: Nabi (Eunae Jeong), a veteran firefighter and divorced single mother, and Vivian (Sunhwa Kang), a flight attendant. Nabi's child Hankyeol (they/them) comes out as transgender, telling Nabi that they want to have their breasts removed. Vivian receives a letter from her son Yejoon, in which he comes out as gay; unable to face his parents' reaction in person, he later moves to Canada to seek greater freedom and distance from social stigma surrounding LGBTQ+ identities in South Korea.

Both mothers initially struggle to comprehend the news. Director Byun stays largely behind the camera, allowing the subjects' own voices to carry the narrative as both mothers work through feelings of confusion, loss, and gradual understanding.

Over the course of the documentary — which spans several years — Nabi and Vivian move from struggling to accept their children's identities to becoming active members of Parents, Families and Allies of LGBTAIQ+ People in Korea (PFLAG Korea). The film captures milestones including medical consultations, LGBTQ+ marches, and the bureaucratic and social obstacles the families face.

== Background and context ==
South Korea does not legally recognize same-sex marriage. The country also lacks a comprehensive anti-discrimination law protecting LGBTQ+ and sexual minorities, though a broad coalition of groups have been organizing to pass such legislation. Against this backdrop, Coming to You documents the transformation of two mothers as they move from initially uninformed parents to participants in LGBTQ+ advocacy.

== Subjects ==
Subject	Role
Eunae "Nabi" Jeong	Herself; mother of Hankyeol; veteran firefighter
Sunhwa "Vivian" Kang	Herself; mother of Yejoon; flight attendant
Hankyeol	Themselves; Nabi's transgender child
Yejoon	Himself; Vivian's gay son
Insun Kwak	Herself
Dongryoul "Jimmy" Joung	Himself
Seongjun Nam	Himself

== Reception ==
Coming to You received critical attention for its portrayal of family acceptance and LGBTQ+ advocacy in South Korea. Bradley Gibson of Film Threat described the documentary as giving viewers a hard look at LGBTQ+ life in a society with narrow cultural definitions of gender and relationships, while Adriana Rosati of Asian Movie Pulse described it as an inspiring account of changing attitudes toward respect, acceptance, and happiness.

The film streamed on Netflix Korea for a limited time and has been available on Kanopy in the United States.

== Awards and nominations ==
Year	Award	Category	Result
2021	22nd Jeonju International Film Festival	Documentary Award	Won
2021	22nd Jeonju International Film Festival	Special Mention, Korean Competition	Won
2021	DMZ International Documentary Film Festival	Brave New Docs Award	Won

== Distribution ==
Coming to You had its world premiere at the Jeonju International Film Festival on April 29, 2021. It subsequently screened at the Frameline46 LGBTQ+ Film Festival in San Francisco in 2022. The film was acquired for international distribution by Film Movement and released via video on demand and digital platforms on March 22, 2024. Video Librarian described the film as appropriate for LGBTQIA+ documentary, Asian Studies, and Korean culture collections.

In South Korea, the film was released theatrically across 56 screens, accumulating 19,042 admissions and a gross of US$109,545.

== See also ==
- PFLAG (Parents, Families and Friends of Lesbians and Gays)
- LGBT rights in South Korea
- Korean documentary film
