= State of denial =

State of denial has several uses including:

- A phrase used to describe someone who refuses to accept the truth (denial)
- State of Denial: Bush at War, Part III a book
- State of Denial (film), a 2003 documentary film about AIDS in Africa, produced and directed by Elaine Epstein
