= List of 2014 box office number-one films in South Korea =

This is a list of films which placed number-one at the South Korean box office during 2014.

== Number-one films ==
†	This implies the highest-grossing movie of the year.

#	Date	Film	Gross
1	January 5, 2014	The Attorney	$8,832,651
2	January 12, 2014	The Attorney	$5,674,447
3	January 19, 2014	Frozen	$7,622,257
4	January 26, 2014	Frozen	$9,061,559
5	February 2, 2014	Frozen	$12,829,792
6	February 9, 2014	Frozen	$8,926,334
7	February 16, 2014	Frozen	$5,817,992
8	February 23, 2014	Pompeii	$3,318,365
9	March 2, 2014	Non-Stop	$5,199,533
10	March 9, 2014	300: Rise of an Empire	$5,489,388
11	March 16, 2014	Thread of Lies	$3,147,024
12	March 23, 2014	Noah	$6,923,797
13	March 30, 2014	Captain America: The Winter Soldier	$8,893,540
14	April 6, 2014	Captain America: The Winter Soldier	$6,060,851
15	April 13, 2014	Captain America: The Winter Soldier	$3,761,561
16	April 20, 2014	Captain America: The Winter Soldier	$1,910,156
17	April 27, 2014	The Amazing Spider-Man 2	$10,841,280
18	May 4, 2014	The Fatal Encounter	$8,184,741
19	May 11, 2014	The Fatal Encounter	$4,494,814
20	May 18, 2014	Godzilla	$3,648,132
21	May 25, 2014	X-Men: Days of Future Past	$11,777,275
22	June 1, 2014	X-Men: Days of Future Past	$6,721,618
23	June 8, 2014	Edge of Tomorrow	$10,515,140
24	June 15, 2014	Edge of Tomorrow	$5,661,015
25	June 22, 2014	Edge of Tomorrow	$4,734,322
26	June 29, 2014	Transformers: Age of Extinction	$15,880,286
27	July 6, 2014	Transformers: Age of Extinction	$8,051,726
28	July 13, 2014	Dawn of the Planet of the Apes	$10,459,420
29	July 20, 2014	Dawn of the Planet of the Apes	$8,255,720
30	July 27, 2014	Kundo: Age of the Rampant	$16,541,019
31	August 3, 2014	The Admiral: Roaring Currents †	$25,755,882
32	August 10, 2014	The Admiral: Roaring Currents †	$21,588,771
33	August 17, 2014	The Admiral: Roaring Currents †	$16,147,266
34	August 24, 2014	The Pirates	$7,380,779
35	August 31, 2014	The Pirates	$4,799,673
36	September 7, 2014	Tazza: The Hidden Card	$23,630,809
37	September 14, 2014	Tazza: The Hidden Card	$15,583,549
38	September 21, 2014	The Maze Runner	$12,233,436
39	September 28, 2014	The Maze Runner	$8,814,258
40	October 5, 2014	Whistle Blower	$17,276,488
41	October 12, 2014	My Love, My Bride	$12,861,547
42	October 19, 2014	My Love, My Bride	$9,821,239
43	October 26, 2014	Gone Girl	$10,551,771
44	November 2, 2014	Gone Girl	$9,558,835
45	November 9, 2014	Interstellar	$16,681,380
46	November 16, 2014	Interstellar	$16,965,703
47	November 23, 2014	Interstellar	$16,468,264
48	November 30, 2014	Interstellar	$14,972,010
49	December 7, 2014	Exodus: Gods and Kings	$11,996,706
50	December 14, 2014	My Love, Don't Cross That River	$13,641,548
51	December 21, 2014	Ode to My Father	$23,166,235
52	December 28, 2014	Ode to My Father	$27,023,802

== Highest-grossing films ==
Highest-grossing films of 2014 (by admissions)
Rank	Title	Country	Admissions	Domestic gross
1.	The Admiral: Roaring Currents	South Korea	17,613,702	US$118.9 million
2.	Frozen	United States	10,296,101	US$72.2 million
3.	Interstellar	United States; United Kingdom	10,105,274	US$70.7 million
4.	The Pirates	South Korea	8,666,068	US$58.1 million
5.	Miss Granny	South Korea	8,658,002	US$54.9 million
6.	The Attorney	South Korea	5,688,905	US$36.7 million
7.	Ode to My Father	South Korea	5,345,698	US$36 million
8.	Transformers: Age of Extinction	United States	5,295,929	US$38.6 million
9.	Kundo: Age of the Rampant	South Korea	4,774,982	US$32.4 million
10.	Edge of Tomorrow	United States	4,697,209	US$33.9 million

Highest-grossing domestic films of 2014 (by admissions)
Rank	Title	Admissions	Domestic gross
1.	The Admiral: Roaring Currents	17,613,702	US$118.9 million
2.	The Pirates	8,666,068	US$58.1 million
3.	Miss Granny	8,658,002	US$54.9 million
4.	The Attorney	5,688,905	US$36.7 million
5.	Ode to My Father	5,345,698	US$36 million
6.	Kundo: Age of the Rampant	4,774,982	US$32.4 million
7.	Tazza: The Hidden Card	4,015,362	US$28.4 million
8.	The Fatal Encounter	3,849,456	US$26.2 million
9.	My Love, Don't Cross That River	3,846,426	US$26.1 million
10.	The Divine Move	3,566,845	US$25.2 million
