= Stop the Presses =

Stop the Presses may refer to:

- Stop the presses, or stop press, an idiomatic exclamation when significant information is discovered
- "Stop the Presses (BoJack Horseman)", an episode of the animated television series BoJack Horseman
- "Stop the Presses", an episode of The Incredible Hulk
- Stop the Presses, a 2008 film by Mark Birnbaum
- Stop the Press, an episode of Shining Time Station
