= Chez Jolie Coiffure =

2018 Belgian documentary

- Directed by: Rosine Mbakam
- Produced by: Geoffrey Cernaix; Rosine Mbakam
- Cinematography: Rosine Mbakam
- Edited by: Geoffrey Cernaix
- Production company: Tândor Productions
- Distributed by: Wallonie Image Production
- Release date: 2018 (DOK Leipzig)
- Running time: 70 minutes
- Countries: Belgium; Cameroon
- Languages: French; Cameroonian Pidgin English

Chez Jolie Coiffure (lit. 'At Jolie Coiffure') is a 2018 Belgian–Cameroonian documentary film directed by Rosine Mbakam. It follows the lives of the staff and clients of a hair salon in Matongé, a neighbourhood of Ixelles known for its large African community.

== Premise ==
Chez Jolie Coiffure follows the daily working life of Sabine Amiyeme, an undocumented Cameroonian woman who fled to Belgium from Lebanon seven years earlier, and who treats the hair of other African migrants living in Brussels, including undocumented immigrants. The film also shows other women working at the salon, including Nadine, Pascaline, Nina, Josiane, and Johnny. Sabine, her co-workers and clients share romantic advice, discuss the Belgian government's plans concerning immigrants, and talk about life in Africa. During the film, Sabine attempts to get clients to join a tontine scheme, organises accommodation for a homeless pregnant woman who lacks immigration papers, and discusses her own experiences emigrating from Cameroon to Lebanon, where she was a victim of modern slavery, and her dangerous journey to Belgium. During the film, tourists often walk past the salon and look into the window. At the end of the film, Sabine flees the salon after she learns immigration police are in the area, due to her being in the country illegally following multiple failed asylum applications. At the end of the film, a client asks Sabine if she intends to return to Cameroon that year; Sabine says that she does not know.

== Production ==
Mbakam stated she had been inspired to make Chez Jolie Coiffure after observing city tours in Matongé, a neighbourhood known for its large immigrant community, stating that she wanted to portray "the separation of the two worlds" and to give the people being observed the opportunity to speak. She stated her aim was for the film was to reclaim the narrative concerning minorities and immigration. Mbakam took time to build trust with the community due to their concerns about being undocumented. Sabine had previously worked as a hairdresser in Cameroon and returned to the work after arriving in Matongé; she and Mbakam, a Cameroonian filmmaker who trained in Belgium, met through a mutual friend.

Chez Jolie Coiffure was Mbakam's second film after her debut, The Two Faces of a Bamiléké Woman, which premiered in 2017. The film has been described as a piece of cinéma vérité, in which Mbakam positions herself as an observer of the migrant women who work and use the salon, and their discussions of their personal issues as well as geopolitical matters. Mbakam utilises the salon's mirrors to film the women on a handheld camera in the 8m² size salon. While she is not seen on camera, at several times during the film Sabine directly addresses Mbakam; at times, Mbakam asks Sabine questions. The women speak in French and Cameroonian Pidgin English. The camera shots are often crossed and blocked by hairdressers and clients moving around the salon. The salon was located in the Matongé Gallery in Ixelles.

Chez Jolie Coiffure was produced by Mbakam's company Tandor Productions and Geoffrey Cernaix, who was also the film's editor. Mbakam served as the film's cinematographer and sound editor, alongside Loïc Villiot. It was filmed over the course of a year, solely inside Sabine's salon in Matongé.

Chez Jolie Coiffure was produced by Icarus Films, in co-production with L'Atelier Cinema du Gsara, WIP, and Indigo Mood Films.

Shortly after the film's premiere, Sabine moved to Liège, where she opened another salon, due to frequent immigration police raids in Matongé. In 2019, she received deportation papers from the Belgian government.

== Release ==
The film is 70 minutes long. It had its world premiere at DOK Leipzig in 2018. It premiered at the Flagey Building in Brussels. It was released in 2019, screening at the True/False and AFI film festivals, as well as the Inncontro Festival. Its international sales were managed by Wallonie Image Production. Chez Jolie Coiffure screened at the 2019 New York African Film Festival.

In 2025, Chez Jolie Coiffure screened at the Brooklyn Academy of Music's "The Black Worker" programme at its 2025 festival.

== Reception ==
Guy Lodge, writing for the American magazine Variety, described Chez Jolie Coiffure as "bright, receptive and keen-eared", praising Mbakam for her "perceptive" filmmaking, including approaching the salon with "open eyes and ears".

Nina Cottam praised the film for immersing audiences in the world of immigrant women and for proving that "we share more with these women than we could have imagined", as well as for putting names and faces to immigrants and therefore "decolonising" the audience's perspective.

Véronique Fievet for the RTBF praised the film for showing the "solidarity" at the heart of the Matongé community, comparing it to the salon in the song "Chez Jeanne" by Brassens.

BX1 described the film as an "intimate documentary".

Quinoa called the film "essential" for understanding the immigrant experience "from the inside" and praised it as a "radiant documentary".
