= Louis Alvarez and Andrew Kolker =

American documentary filmmakers

Louis Alvarez (born January 23, 1955) and Andrew Kolker (born February 20, 1952) are American documentary filmmakers whose works deal with various aspects of American society and culture. Their films have been shown frequently on the American Public Broadcasting Service and are notable for their use of humor in the examination of serious subjects such as social class and politics. Alvarez and Kolker's work has been recognized by two Peabody Awards and two Alfred I. duPont-Columbia University Awards.

== Early life ==
Alvarez and Kolker first met in New Orleans in the mid-1970s as activist videomakers working in the city's poor neighborhoods, and their earlier work portrays life in New Orleans and surrounding parishes.

== Works ==
Their best-known works are People Like Us: Social Class in America, which is a wide-ranging examination of the American class system from 2001, and American Tongues, a 1987 study of dialects of North American English and their social implications. They have also collaborated with the filmmaker Paul Stekler on several films about American politics and culture, including Louisiana Boys - Raised on Politics and Vote for Me: Politics in America.

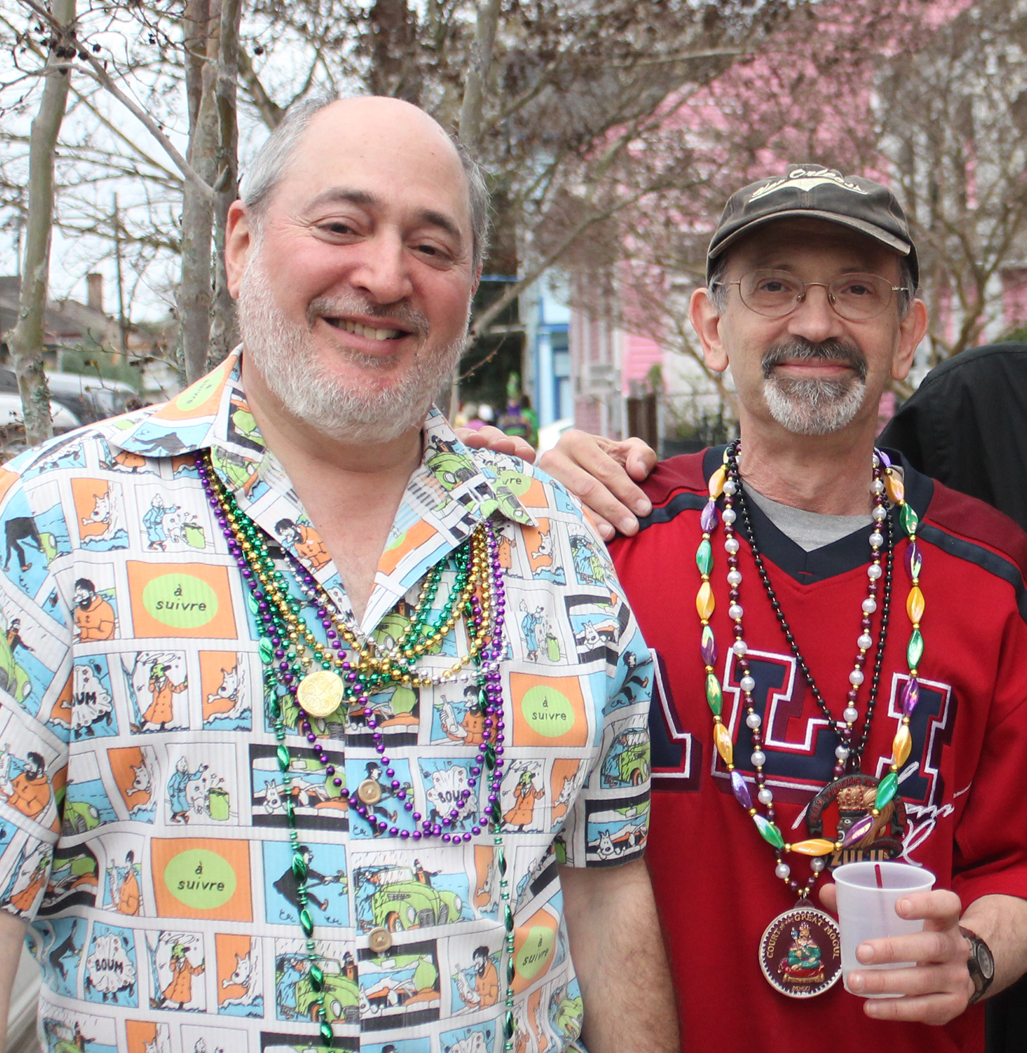
Louis Alvarez and Andrew Kolker in Mardi Gras attire on the set of their documentary film Getting Back to Abnormal.

Between 1994 and 2014 Alvarez and Kolker collaborated with the film editor and producer Peter Odabashian on their films.

== Filmography ==
- Changing the Channel, 1977
- Talking Crime, 1978
- The Clarks, 1979
- The Ends of the Earth: Plaquemines Parish, Louisiana, 1982
- El mosco y el agua alta, or Mosquitoes and High Water, 1983
- Yeah You Rite!, 1985
- American Tongues, 1987
- L.A. is It with John Gregory Dunne, 1990
- The Japanese Version, 1991
- Louisiana Boys—Raised on Politics, 1993
- Vote for Me: Politics in America, 1996
- MOMS, 1999
- People Like Us: Social Class in America, 2001
- Sex: Female, 2003
- Small Ball—A Little League Story, 2004
- The Anti-Americans (a hate/love relationship), 2007
- Past/Present [video game], 2012
- Getting Back to Abnormal, 2013
- Buckwheat's World, 2015
- Postcards from the Great Divide, 2016
