= Rosine Mbakam =

Cameroonian film director (born 1980)

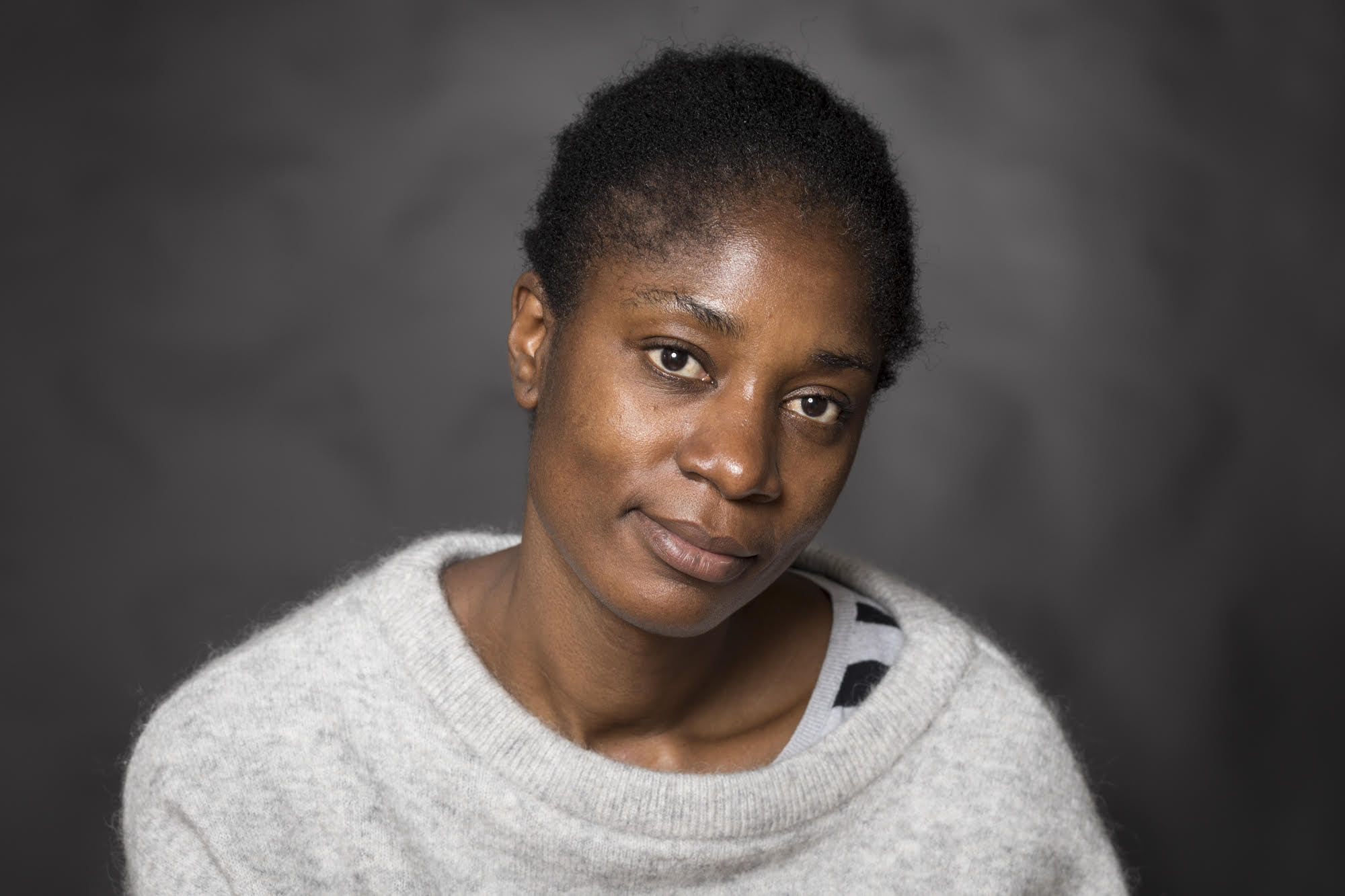
- Born: January 10, 1980 (age 46)
- Citizenship: Cameroonian
- Occupation: Film Director
- Years active: 2001- till present
- Notable work: Un cadeau

Rosine Mbakam (born in 1980) is a Cameroonian film director based in Belgium. She has directed many short films and full-length documentaries. Les deux visages d'une femme Bamiléké/The Two Faces of a Bamiléké Woman (2016) and Chez Jolie Coiffure (2018) won a number of international prizes. Les prières de Delphine/Delphine’s Prayers (2021) gained international attention, including reviews in The New York Times, The New Yorker, LA Times, Variety, and NPR. With Mambar Pierrette, Mbakam made her feature film debut in 2023.

== Biography ==
Rosine Mbakam was born in Cameroon in 1980. She grew up in a traditional Bamiléké family. She spent her childhood in Yaoundé, the capital city of Cameroon.

Rosine Mbakam made her debut in cinema in 2001 and gained an education in thorough audiovisual media in Cameroon between 2000 and 2004 at the center of COE (Centro orientamento Educativo), an Italian nongovernmental organization (NGO) based in Yaoundé. She then joined the private Cameroonian television channel Spectrum Télévision (STV) where she worked as a photojournalist and directed programs from 2003 to 2007 10. In 2007, when she was 27, she left Cameroon for Belgium and enrolled in Institut Supérieur des Arts (INSAS) in Brussels, where she continued her studies in film and audiovisual production. She graduated from INSAS in 2012.

== Career ==
Rosine Mbakam directed her first films in 2009 while she was still a student. This includes a few short films: Un cadeau released in 2010 and Les Portes du Passé released in 2011. With Mikro Popvitch in 2011, she co-directed the film Mavambu, which is a portrait of the Congolese artist, Freddy Tsimba, and was produced by Africalia. After obtaining her degree in 2012, she directed and edited films and documentaries for the society of Africalia production at the same time as directing her own. In 2014, she co-founded the production company. As an extension of her own filmmaking career, Mbakam serves as an instructor to students at The Royal Academy of Fine Arts (KASK).

=== The Two Faces of a Bamiléké Woman ===
In 2016, Rosine Mbakam directed her first feature film, a creative documentary titled Les deux visages d'une femme Bamiléké (The Two Faces of a Bamiléké Woman). The 76-minute film is a personal documentary in which the director focuses on her return to her native country with her French husband and their son, seven years after she left. The film is built by a series of conversations mainly between Mbakam and her mother on varied subjects connected to family, gender, and also politics. The International Film Festival Rotterdam (IFFR) and Panafrican Film and Television Festival of Ouagadougou (FESPACO) are among the sixty-plus film festivals at which this movie has been screened.

=== Chez Jolie Coiffure ===
In 2018, she directed Chez Jolie Coiffure. This 71-minute documentary concerns the immigration, daily life, and difficulties experienced by African immigrants in Europe. The film takes place in a hair salon in the neighborhood of Matonge in Brussels and focuses on the stories of the owner, a Cameroonian immigrant woman seeking residency along with her friends.

=== Delphine’s Prayers ===
In 2021, Rosine Mbakam directed a third documentary called Les prières de Delphine (Delphine’s Prayers). This film is a portrayal of Delphine, a young Cameroonian woman who has been caught in sex work in Cameroon. She was abandoned by her father after the death of her mother, and by age 13, she was raped and pregnant with a daughter. Sex work becomes her ticket to Belgium after she makes a man who is 3 times her age her husband.

=== Mambar Pierrette ===
In 2023, Mbakam released her first narrative feature, Mambar Pierrette, centered on a talented seamstress and single mother in Douala which premiered at the Toronto Film Festival.

== Personal life ==
In 2014, she visited her home in Cameroon for the first time in seven years after leaving for Belgium and marrying her husband. They now have two sons.

== Awards and honors ==
- 2017: Sélections Regards du Présent & Place au doc - FIFF Namur (Belgium)
- 2017: États généraux du film documentaire - (France) - Journée Scam
- 2017: Mention spéciale - Documentaire international - Écrans noirs - Yaoundé (Cameroon)
- 2017: Meilleur Film, Do Pao International Documentary Film Festival
- 2017: Delhi International Film Festival
- 2017: The Prize of the Flemish Unesco Commission
- 2017: Special Menstion, Festival international du film documentaire de Saint-Louis (Sénégal)
- 2017: Panorama belge Festival Filmer à tout prix Bruxelles (Belgique)
- 2017: African Diaspora International Film Festival
- 2018: DOK.FEST Internationales Dokumentarfilmfestival München - Munich (Allemagne) - Sélection
- 2018: New York African Film Festival (New York)
- 2018: Meilleur Documentaire, London Feminist Film Festival (Royaume Uni)
- 2018: International Film Festival Rotterdam
- 2019: Discovery Award, Society of Media Authors and Creators (SCAM)
- 2019: West African Film Festival
- 2019: The Spirit of the Festival Prize at Light Film Festival
- 2019: Nominated for the FESPACO and the Emerging International Filmmaker Award in London for her film Chez Jolie Coiffure.
- 2021: Cinéma du réel Young Jury Award 2021 for Delphine' Prayer

== Filmography ==
- 2010: Un cadeau
- 2012: Tu seras mon allié/You Will Be My Ally (short film)
- 2012: Mavambu (a short portrait)
- 2013: Les portes du passé
- 2016: Les Deux Visages d'une femme bamiléké/The Two Faces of a Bamiléké Woman (documentary)
- 2018: Chez Jolie Coiffure (documentary)
- 2020: La majorité invisible
- 2021: Les prières de Delphine (documentary)
- 2021: Prisme (co-director)
- 2023: Mambar Pierrette (feature film)
