= Legacy (2000 film) =

2000 documentary film by Tod Lending

- Film poster
- Directed by: Tod Lending
- Written by: Tod Lending
- Produced by: Daniel Alpert; Tod Lending
- Edited by: Daniel Alpert
- Music by: Sheldon Mirowitz
- Production company: Nomadic Pictures
- Distributed by: Cinemax
- Release date: February 1, 2000
- Running time: 90 minutes
- Country: United States
- Language: English

Legacy is a 2000 American documentary film directed by Tod Lending. It was nominated for an Academy Award for Best Documentary Feature.

The film tracks three different generations (over five years) of a family in Chicago that lives in the Henry Horner Homes public housing. Their lives change, however, after a life-altering event - the murder of a family member - slowly changes them to have a more positive outlook on life.

== Reception ==
Legacy has an approval rating of 80% on review aggregator website Rotten Tomatoes, based on 5 reviews, and an average rating of 7.60/10.
