= Vote for Me =

Vote for Me is a 1996 documentary film which documents local political campaigns across the United States in 1994. It was directed by Louis Alvarez, Andrew Kolker, and Paul Stekler.
