= Knocking on Armageddon's Door =

Knocking on Armageddon's Door is a 1988 documentary film which explores several survivalists in the United States as they prepare for nuclear war. It was directed by Torv Carlsen and John R. Magnus.
