= Swim Team (film) =

- Directed by: Lara Stolman
- Produced by: Lara Stolman; Shanna Belott
- Starring: Michael McQuay; Maria McQuay; Kelvin Truong; Mikey McQuay; Robert Justino
- Cinematography: Laela Kilbourn
- Edited by: Ann Collins
- Music by: Mark Suozzo
- Production company: Woodland Park Productions
- Distributed by: PBS Distribution; Espresso Media; Argot Pictures
- Release dates: October 9, 2016 (Hot Springs Doc Film Festival); July 7, 2017 (United States)
- Running time: 100 minutes
- Country: United States
- Language: English

Swim Team is a 2016 American documentary sports film about a competitive swim team of teenagers on the autism spectrum. The film was directed and produced by Lara Stolman. It premiered at the 2016 Hot Springs Documentary Film Festival and was released in theaters in the United States on July 7, 2017.

== Synopsis ==
Swim Team follows the Jersey Hammerheads swim team, based in Perth Amboy, New Jersey, founded by parent volunteers Michael and Maria McQuay, and made up entirely of teenagers on the autism spectrum; the team is also largely Latino and Asian. Focusing on three athletes and their struggles in and out of the water, the film explores themes and issues related to their transitions to adulthood, and how their parents cope with raising a child with autism.

== Production ==
Director Lara Stolman is a longtime TV news and documentary producer, and Swim Team is her documentary feature debut. Filming took place from January 2014 through June 2014, with follow-ups over the next year. It was selected for IFP's 2016 Documentary Completion Lab, and received grants from New York Women in Film and Television, the Loreen Arbus Foundation, the Aetna Foundation, and the Karma Foundation.

== Release ==
Swim Team premiered at the 2016 Hot Springs Documentary Film Festival on October 9, 2016, where it was named Best Sports Documentary. It was released theatrically in a limited run starting at IFC Center in New York on July 7, 2017. It aired on PBS' POV on October 2, 2017, and began streaming on Netflix on April 2, 2018.

== Reception ==
Robert Abele of the Los Angeles Times wrote, "The breaststroking, freestyling young athletes in 'Swim Team' couldn't be more different in terms of personality, drive, appeal and, of course, developmental challenges, and it gives this film from Lara Stolman its particular character, heart and verve." James Sullivan of The Boston Globe wrote, "The film has plenty going for it, from the strength of its character development to the beauty of its balletic underwater footage." The film was called "an eye-opening look at one couple's response to the dearth of public services, therapies and programs for their son" by Sheri Linden of The Hollywood Reporter. "Stolman has gained the trust of these families, resulting in an intimacy that's both insightful and disarming", wrote Christy Lemire in RogerEbert.com. "It feels like a privilege to get to know these folks - to share in their private moments as well as their pride. The result is a film that's both eye-opening and heart-opening."

Swim Team won the Jury Award for Best New Jersey Film at the 2016 Monmouth Film Festival; the New Jersey Films Competition at the 2017 Montclair Film Festival; Best Cinematography at the 2017 Wales International Documentary Film Festival; the Human Spirit Award at the 2017 Nashville Film Festival, where it was also nominated for the Grand Jury Prize for Best Documentary Feature; and the Jury Award for Ethos at the 2017 Social Impact Media Awards, US.
