= American Tongues =

- Directed by: Louis Alvarez; Andy Kolker
- Starring: Molly Ivins; Robert Klein; Trey Wilson
- Narrated by: Polly Holliday
- Music by: Dr. John
- Country of origin: United States
- Original language: English

Production
- Producers: Louis Alvarez; Andy Kolker
- Running time: 56 minutes
- Production company: Center for New American Media

Original release
- Release: July 5, 1988

American Tongues is a 1988 sociolinguistic documentary examining American English dialects and accents and perceptions thereof.

It was produced and directed by Louis Alvarez and Andrew Kolker. The Center for New American Media won a Peabody Award for the film in 1987. It aired on the first season of the PBS series POV in 1988.
