= DMZ International Documentary Film Festival =

Film festival in DMZ South Korea

- Official poster
- Opening film: Farming the Revolution by Nishtha Jain
- Closing film: Filmlovers! by Arnaud Desplechin
- Location: Goyang and Paju, Gyeonggi-do, South Korea
- Founded: 2009
- Most recent: 2024
- Awards: White Goose Award (Grand Prize)
- Hosted by: Organizing Committee of DMZ International Documentary Film Festival
- No. of films: 140
- Festival date: Opening: September 26, 2024; Closing: October 2, 2024
- Website: DMZ Docs 2024 Fact Sheet

Current: 16th DMZ International Documentary Film Festival
- 17th DMZ Docs 15th DMZ Docs

DMZ International Documentary Film Festival (Korean: DMZ국제다큐멘터리영화제), also known as DMZ Docs, is a South Korean film festival for documentary films jointly presented by Gyeonggi Province, Paju and Goyang. Launched in 2009, it is held annually for seven days in September/October less than twenty kilometers from the Korean Demilitarized Zone, and showcases films dealing with "peace, coexistence and reconciliation".

== History ==
- 1st DMZ Docs, October 21-26, 2009

Films screened: 61 films from 33 countries
Opening film: The Heart of Jenin, Lior Geller and Marcus Vetter, Germany
Closing film:

- 2nd DMZ Docs, September 9-13, 2010

Films screened: 74 films from 35 countries
Opening film: Peace, Kazuhiro Soda, Japan
Closing film:

- 3rd DMZ Docs, September 22-28, 2011

Films screened: 101 films from 30 countries
Opening film: After the Apocalypse, Antony Butts, Britain
Closing film: The Tiniest Place, Tatiana Huezo, Mexico

- 4th DMZ Docs, September 21-27, 2012

Films screened: 115 films from 36 countries
Opening film: Ping Pong, Hugh Hartford, Canada
Closing film:

- 5th DMZ Docs, October 17-23, 2013

Films screened: 119 films from 38 countries
Opening film: Manshin: Ten Thousand Spirits, Park Chan-kyong, South Korea
Closing film:

- 6th DMZ Docs, September 17-24, 2014

Films screened: 163 films from 33 countries
Opening film: Crying Boxers, E Il-ha, South Korea
Closing film:

- 7th DMZ Docs, September 17-24, 2015

Films screened: 102 films from 43 countries
Opening film: I Am Sun Mu, Adam Sjöberg, United States
Closing film:

- 8th DMZ Docs, September 22-29, 2016

Films screened: 116 films from 36 countries
Opening film: One Warm Spring Day, Chung Su-eun, South Korea
Closing film:

- 9th DMZ Docs, September 21-27, 2017

Films screened: 114 films from 42 countries
Opening film: Old Marine Boy, Jin Mo-young, South Korea
Closing film:

- 10th DMZ Docs, September 13-20, 2018

Films screened: 142 films from 39 countries
Opening film: Coming to You, Minu, Jee Hye-won, South Korea
Closing film:

- 11th DMZ Docs, September 20-27, 2019

Films screened: 151 films from 46 countries
Opening film: Across the Desert, Through the Lake Let's Peace!, Park So-hyun, South Korea
Closing film:

- 12th DMZ Docs, September 17-24, 2020

Films screened: 122 films from 33 countries
Opening film: A Long Way to School, Kim Jeong-in, South Korea
Closing film:

- 13th DMZ Docs, September 9-16, 2021

Films screened: 126 documentaries from 39 countries
Opening film: Soup and Ideology, Yang Yong-hi, South Korea
Closing film:

- 14th DMZ Docs, September 22-29, 2022

Films screened: 137 documentaries from 53 countries
Opening film: Keep Stepping, Luke Cornish
Grand Prize: Disturbed Earth

- 15th DMZ Docs, September 14-21, 2023

Films screened: 148 documentaries from 54 countries
Opening film: The Eternal Memory, Chile
Grand Prize: Obscure Night – Goodbye Here, Anywhere by Sylvain George

- 16th DMZ Docs, September 26- October 2, 2024

Films screened: 140 documentaries from 43 countries
Opening film: Farming the Revolution, by Nishtha Jain, India, France, Norway
Closing film: Filmlovers! by Arnaud Desplechin
Grand Prize: In Limbo by Alina Maksimenko

== Awards ==
- International Competition: White Goose Award (cash prize of ₩15 million); Special Jury Award (₩7 million)
- Korean Competition: Best Korean Documentary Award (₩10 million); Special Jury Award (₩5 million)
- Audience Award (₩3 million)
- Youth Competition: Best Youth Documentary Award (₩1 million); Excellence Award (₩500,000)

=== White Goose Award ===
Year	Title	Director	Country
2009	Defamation	Yoav Shamir	
2010			
2011	The Tiniest Place	Tatiana Huezo	Mexico
2012	With or Without Me	Tran Phuong Thao, Swann Dubus	Vietnam
2013			
2014			
2015	Homeland (Iraq Year Zero)	Abbas Fahdel	Iraq
2016	Those Who Jump	Abou Bakar Sidibe, Moritz Siebert, Estephan Wagner	Denmark
2017	Communion service	Anna Jametska	Poland
2019	143 Sahara Street	Hassen Ferhani	Algeria, France, Qatar
2020	King Asu	Alyx Ain Arumpak	Philippines, France
2021	Soup and Ideology	Yang Yong-hi	Korean-Japanese
2022	Disturbed Earth	Kumjana Novakova and Guillermo Carreras-Candi	Bosnia and Herzegovina, Spain, North Macedonia
2023	Obscure Night – Goodbye Here, Anywhere	Sylvain George	France, Switzerland
2024	In Limbo	Alina Maksimenko	Poland

=== Special Jury Award ===
Year	Title	Director	Country
2009	Sweet Crude	Sandy Cioffi	USA
2010			
2011	Bombay Beach	Alma Har'el	USA
2012			
2013			
2014			
2015			
2016	When Two Worlds Collide	Heidi Brandenburg, Mathew Orzel	Peru, United States, United Kingdom
2017	Wash Show	Andrea Dalsgard, Obaida Zaytun	Denmark, Finland, Syrian Arab Republic
2020	I Am a Journalist	Mori Tatsuya	Japan
2021	President	Camille Nielsson	Denmark
2022	We, Students!	Rafiki Fariala	Central African Republic, France, Democratic Republic of Congo, Saudi Arabia

=== Best Korean Documentary ===
Year	Title	Director
2009		
2010		
2011	My Father's House	Kang Yu Ga-ram
2012	Summer Days in Bloom	Go U-jung, Roh Eun-ji
2013		
2014		
2015		
2016	The Remnants	Kim Il-rhan, Lee Hyuk-sang
2017	Forgetting and Memory 2: Looking Back	4.16 Solidarity Media Committee
2020	People Who Don't Carry Guns 2: Challenge the Taboo	Hwan-Tae Kim
2021	Boundary: Flaming Feminist Action	Yoon Ga-hyun
2022	Time of Seeds	Seol Suan

=== Audience Award ===
Year	Title	Director	Country
2009			
2010			
2011	Goodbye Homerun	Lee Jung-ho	South Korea
2012	Turn It Up to Eleven 2: Wild Days	Baek Seung-hwa	South Korea
2013			
2014	My Love, Don't Cross That River	Jin Mo-young	South Korea
2015			
2016	The Remnants	Kim Il-rhan, Lee Hyuk-sang	South Korea
2017	Rice Flower	Oh Jeong-hoon	South Korea
2021	A fairy tale in its prime	Won Ho-yeon	South Korea
2022	I am More	Lee Ilha	South Korea

=== Best Youth Documentary ===
Year	Title	Director	Country
2009			
2010			
2011	Uncomfortable Eyes, Uncomfortable Truth	You Seok-hyun, Park Ka-young	South Korea
2012	Less Than 1%	Ha Seo-young	South Korea
2013			
2014			
2015			
2016	Between 9 and 0	Kim Su-min	South Korea
2017	Step by Step	Heo Na-kyung	South Korea

=== Excellence Award in Youth Competition ===
Year	Title	Director	Country
2009			
2010			
2011	High School Student's Guide to Be a Filmmaker	Kim Seul-gi	South Korea
2012	I Want to Be a Nineteen	Yu Min-ah, Jung Min-su, Kim Su-min, Kim Seul-gi	South Korea
2013			
2014			
2015			
2016	We Can Call It Love	Min Geo	South Korea
2017	Friends	Minseo Kim, Namjoo Kim, Seongjae Lee	South Korea
