= The Two Faces of a Bamiléké Woman =

- Directed by: Rosine Mbakam
- Production companies: Tândor Productions; L'Atelier Cinéma du GSARA; CBA - Centre de l'Audiovisuel à Bruxelles
- Release date: 2018
- Countries: Cameroon; Belgium
- Language: French

The Two Faces of a Bamiléké Woman (French: Les Deux Visages d'une femme Bamiléké) is a 2018 film directed by Rosine Mbakam. The film explores the life of a young Bamiléké woman who lives in Belgium and returns to her native village in Cameroon to reconnect with her roots. The film delves into themes of cultural identity, family, and the challenges of reconciling two different worlds. It has received critical acclaim for its intimate portrayal of the protagonist's personal journey and the complexities of her relationship with her family and community.

== Plot ==
The Two Faces of a Bamiléké Woman" follows the story of a young Bamiléké woman named Rosine who lives in Belgium with her husband and children. Feeling a sense of disconnect from her roots and culture, Rosine decides to return to her native village in Cameroon to visit her mother. As she reacquaints herself with her family and community, Rosine grapples with the cultural expectations placed on her as a Bamiléké woman and the pressures of balancing her Westernized identity with her African heritage. Through intimate conversations with her mother, grandmother, and other women in the village, Rosine learns about the complexities of being a modern Bamiléké woman and the challenges of navigating the expectations of both societies. The film showcases the struggles and triumphs of Rosine as she seeks to reconcile the two faces of her identity and find a sense of belonging in both worlds.
