= Jin Mo-young =

South Korean documentary filmmaker

- Born: South Korea
- Occupation: Documentary filmmaker
- Years active: 1997-present

Korean name
- Hangul: 진모영
- RR: Jin Moyeong
- MR: Chin Moyŏng

Jin Mo-young is a South Korean documentary filmmaker. He directed My Love, Don't Cross That River (2014).

== Career ==
Jin Mo-young has been directing and producing television documentaries since 1997. In 2012, he produced the feature film Shiva, Throw Your Life (directed by Lee Seong-kyu).

Jin made his feature directorial debut in 2014 with My Love, Don't Cross That River, about 98-year-old Jo Byeong-man and 89-year-old Kang Kye-yeol, who'd been married for 76 years. Jin filmed the elderly couple in their mountain village home in Hoengseong County, Gangwon Province for 15 months, until Jo's death. My Love, Don't Cross That River won the Audience Award at the 2014 DMZ International Documentary Film Festival and Best Independent Film at the 2015 KOFRA Film Awards. The film was a surprise hit at the box office, drawing 4.64 million admissions to become the highest grossing Korean independent/documentary film of all time. Jin said, "I tried to shoot the lifelong love of the couple without affectation. [...] Life and death has great meaning. Since I wanted to produce content that could be widely consumed, I though the story was global and could move the hearts of everyone. [...] I didn't expect the response to be this strong. It appears that people from all age groups feel moved by the film. I think it's because it makes people realize what enduring love is about."

Jin is currently filming his next project Outsider about North Korean defectors, which he calls "a story about a family on the borderline between being native and alien."

== Filmography ==
- Shiva, Throw Your Life (2013) - producer, script editor
- My Love, Don't Cross That River (2014) - director, cinematographer
