= Made in Ethiopia (film) =

Made in Ethiopia is a 2024 documentary film which explores the impacts of Chinese industrialization in Africa through the stories of three women who work at a Chinese-run industrial park in Dukem, Ethiopia. It was directed by Xinyan Yu and Max Duncan.
