= Tokyo Uber Blues =

2021 documentary film by Taku Aoyagi

Tokyo Uber Blues is a 2021 documentary film which follows a film school graduate as he leaves his home and becomes an Uber Eats bike courier in Tokyo during the 2020 pandemic lockdown. It was directed by and stars Taku Aoyagi.
