= Tod Lending =

American film director

- Occupations: Producer, Director, Writer, Cinematographer
- Known for: Documentary Film
- Notable work: All the Difference (2016), Legacy (2001), Omar & Pete (2005)
- Website: nomadicpictures.org

Tod Lending is an American producer, director, writer and cinematographer. His documentary film Legacy (2000) was nominated for an Academy Award for Best Documentary Feature.

== Filmography ==
- Saul & Ruby's Holocaust Survivor Band (Feature documentary – Samuel Goldwyn Films distributor) (2020)
- All The Difference (Feature and TV documentary – PBS – POV) (2016)
- Legacy (Feature and TV documentary – HBO) (2000)
- Omar & Pete (Feature and TV documentary – PBS – POV) (2005)
- The Principal Story (TV series documentary – PBS – POV) (2009)
- Vezo (2014)
- Burden of Silence (TV series documentary – Al Jazeera Network – Witness) (2012)
- In This Room (Al Jazeera Network) (2013)
- Aimee's Crossing (TV documentary – PBS) (2008)
- Time to Speak (TV documentary – PBS) (1998)
- Breaking Ties (TV documentary – PBS) (1996)
- Growin' Up Not a Child (TV documentary – PBS) (1995)
- Rosevelt's America (TV documentary – PBS) (2005)
- Modern Cool'
- Haiti'
