= Stephen G. Roszel =

American Methodist preacher

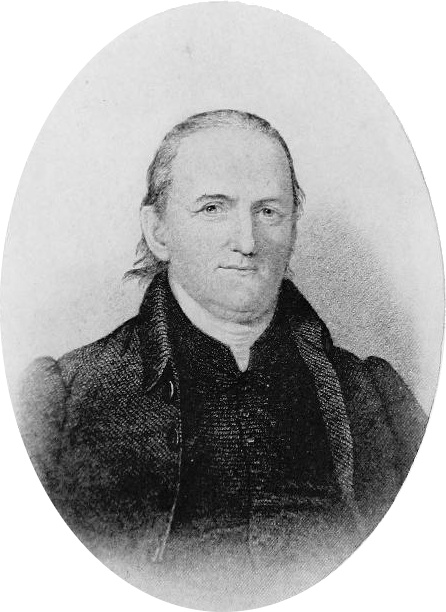
Portrait of Stephen George Roszel

Reverend Stephen George Roszel (also spelled Roszell; April 8, 1770 – May 14, 1841) was a Methodist preacher and leading member of the Baltimore Conference.

== Early life ==
Stephen George Roszel was born on April 8, 1770, in Loudoun County, Virginia, the oldest son in a large family. His mother, Sarah, was a leader in the first Methodist society of Baltimore County, Maryland. His father was named Stephen.

Around the age of 16, Roszel became deeply interested in Christian teachings and the Methodist Episcopal Church. In 1789, he was admitted into the Williamsburg Circuit as a traveling preacher on a trial basis, under the guidance of Francis Asbury. Roszel quickly gained influence within the church by exhibiting "flaming zeal and strong talents". In 1794, he was selected as host for the first Annual Conference held in Harrisonburg, Virginia. Also that year, he applied for and was granted a local station so that he could better earn a living to support his siblings.

== Church elder ==
At the 1804 Annual Conference in Baltimore, Roszel was re-admitted to the traveling circuit. However, the decision was reconsidered at the Conference, and it was decided he should stay in his local station, likely because of his family situation. He remained in contact with the Baltimore Circuit, and in 1807, rejoined the Conference as an itinerant minister. Shortly thereafter, he married Mary "Polly" Calvert on April 12, 1808.

Roszel was "a large, portly man" who "paid little regard for the graces," instead speaking straightforwardly. He was a physically strong man who was not afraid to argue vigorously with opponents of Methodist doctrine. He had a reputation as an excellent preacher and often preached at revivals where he was reported to have gained many converts. When Roszel preached in a church setting, he took his time, and his sermons were generally not shorter than an hour and a half, and sometimes exceeded two hours.

Roszel moved around often during his long career as a preacher, serving in Alexandria County, District of Columbia; Baltimore; Frederick County, Virginia; Georgetown County, South Carolina; Loudon; Philadelphia County, Pennsylvania; and Potomac, Virginia, among other places. He was considered an excellent debater and had "wide and powerful influence" within the Methodist Church as a result. He was a leading speaker at the church's Annual Conference and represented the Baltimore Conference at the 1808 General Conference. Roszel was a leading figure in the movement to establish rules by which regular, delegated General Conferences would be held going forward. He made several motions on the issue, including the one that gave the General Conference the power to make the rules and regulations of the church. He was subsequently an elected delegate at every delegated General Conference from the first one in 1812 until his death, representing either the Philadelphia Conference or the Baltimore Conference.

At the 1836 General Conference, Roszel was part of a strong push back against abolitionists within the Church. He authored a paper strongly indicting abolitionism. An attached resolution stating that the General Conference was "decidedly opposed to modern abolitionism, and wholly disclaims any right, wish or intention to interfere in the civil and political relation between master and slave" passed by a 122 to 11 vote. Roszel also moved for a Pastoral Address against abolition. The motion was adopted, and the Address was widely distributed, temporarily quelling the angst that would eventually cause the Methodist Episcopal Church, South, to split from the northern church in 1844. Earlier, at the 1808 General Conference, Roszel had moved to retain the acceptance of slavery in the Book of Discipline and allow each Annual Conference to frame its regulations on the slave trade.

== Death and legacy ==
Roszel's final assignment was to the Hillborough Circuit in February 1841. He died on May 14, 1841, in Leesburg, Virginia, after a brief illness. After his death, Nathan Bangs said, "The qualities of [Roszel's] mind and heart were strong and practical, rather than speculative, beautiful or graceful... He possessed the most indomitable perseverance... and few men of his day who had an eye and hand more constantly or effectively on the great interest of the Church than Mr. Roszel." The 1841 Baltimore Conference Minutes commemorated him as "a man possessing singular courage, fortitude, constancy, and benevolence," adding that he was "blessed with a strong mind, a ready elocution, and great physical power."

When Roszel joined the Methodist Episcopal Church, it had 149 traveling preachers in the United States and 42,000 members. Through the work of Roszel and his contemporaries, membership had grown to 850,000 with 3,800 traveling preachers by the time of his death. Two of Roszel's sons, Stephen Asbury (February 18, 1811 – February 20, 1852) and Stephen Samuel (October 20, 1812 – April 27, 1882), became influential Methodist preachers in their own right. Several of Roszel's personal letters have survived to modern times, providing an intimate look inside the life of revival preachers.
