= Elizabeth Farnsworth =

American journalist and author

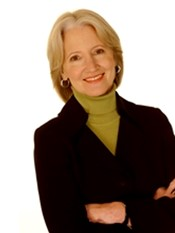
- Elizabeth Farnsworth (2008)
- Born: Elizabeth Fink; 23 December 1943 (age 82); Minneapolis, Minnesota
- Occupations: Author and Journalist
- Notable work: Last Light and A Train Through Time – A Life, Real and Imagined

Elizabeth Farnsworth (née Fink; born December 23, 1943) is a journalist, author, and filmmaker. She is a former foreign correspondent and former chief correspondent and principal substitute anchor of PBS NewsHour with Jim Lehrer. She has written two books, including a novella, Last Light, which was published by Flint Hills Publishing (March, 2024), and a memoir. Her 2008 documentary, The Judge and the General, (co-directed with Patricio Lanfranco), aired on television around the world, winning many awards. She has reported from Cambodia, Vietnam, Chile, Haiti, Iraq, and Iran, among other places. Having previously lived in Peru, Chile, Los Angeles, and Washington, D.C. for extended periods, she now lives in Berkeley, California, with her husband, Charles E. Farnsworth. They have two married children and six grandchildren.

== Early life and education ==
Farnsworth was born Elizabeth Fink in Minneapolis, Minnesota, the daughter of Jane (Mills) Fink (1911- 1953) and H. Bernerd Fink (1909–1999), while her father was stationed at Wold–Chamberlain Naval Air Station during WW II (now known as Minneapolis–Saint Paul International Airport). From this union, she had one older sister, Marcia (Fink) Anderson (1937–2022). Shortly after Elizabeth's birth, the family moved (1944) back to Topeka, Kansas, where both her parents had been born and raised. Both of her parents are descended from easterners who came to Kansas as pioneers. Farnsworth's mother's great-grandparents were abolitionists. In 1953, when she was 9 years old, her mother died of cancer. Her father remarried in 1955 to a widow, Ruth (Garvey) Cochener, who had three children from her previous marriage.

Farnsworth graduated from Topeka High School in 1961 and was inducted into the school's Hall of Fame in 1998. She attended Middlebury College, Middlebury, VT, where she graduated magna cum laude in 1965. She earned an M.A. in Latin American History from Stanford University in 1966. She received an honorary doctorate degree from Colby College (2002) and Washburn University (2021).

== Career ==
Farnsworth first appeared regularly on public television in 1975 as a panelist covering Latin America on the national television program "World Press", produced by KQED in San Francisco. In the 1970s and 80's she contributed articles to the San Francisco Chronicle, Foreign Policy, and Mother Jones (magazine), among other publications. With Eric Leenson and Richard Feinberg, she wrote about the economic blockade against Chile during the years Salvador Allende was president. That research became a book, El Bloqueo Invisible, in Buenos Aires in 1973.

In 1984 she became a contributing correspondent to The MacNeil/Lehrer NewsHour, later known as The NewsHour with Jim Lehrer and then PBS News Hour. In 1995 she became chief correspondent and principal substitute anchor, and in 1999 became senior correspondent and head of the San Francisco office. From 1984 until 2005, she reported in print and on television from numerous countries, among them: Vietnam, Cambodia, South Korea, Japan, Chile, Peru, Guatemala, Saudi Arabia, Iran, Iraq, Israel (the West Bank and Gaza), Botswana, Malawi and Turkey.

Farnsworth was a Fellow at the Center for Art Environment of the Nevada Museum of Art from 2010 to 2013. In June 2013 an exhibit, Fracked: North Dakota's Oil boom, featuring photographs by Terry Evans (photographer) and written by Farnsworth, opened at the Field Museum of Natural History in Chicago. After a year, the exhibit traveled to the North Dakota Museum of Art, and since then it has traveled to other cities in North Dakota.

Farnsworth is a former member of the Board of Directors of the World Affairs Council (Northern California) and currently a member of that organization's Advisory Committee. She also serves on the Advisory Committee of the UC Berkeley School of Law Human Rights Center.

== Awards and honors ==
- 1984 – San Francisco Film Festivals, Golden Gate Award for The Gospel and Guatemala, co-produced by Farnsworth and Stephen Talbot. The production aired on PBS.
- 1991 – CINE's Golden Eagle Award for Thanh's War, co-produced by Farnsworth and John Knoop. The production aired on PBS.
- 1992 – American Film and Video Festival Blue Ribbon Award and the National Educational Film Festival Award for Thanh's War, co-produced by Farnsworth and John Knoop.
- 1995 - The Topeka Capital-Journal's 1997 Distinguished Kansan Of The Year Award.
- 2001 – New York Festivals, Silver World Medal for TV Programming, The NewsHour with Jim Lehrer, AIDS in Africa-Global Help (four-part series). Farnsworth did the reporting for this series that was produced by Joanne Elgart.
- 2010 – Alfred I. duPont–Columbia University Award for excellence in broadcast journalism, for The Judge and the General. The production aired on PBS.

== Nominations ==
- 1991 – San Francisco Bay/ Northern CA Area Emmy nomination for Outstanding Individual Achievement: Writing-program for Thanh's War, written by KQED's, Elizabeth Farnsworth.
- 2001 – Emmy Awards nomination: PBS NewsHour 4 part 2001 series, AIDS crisis in Botswana and Malawi, produced by Joanne Elgart, reported by Elizabeth Farnsworth.
- 2008 – Directors Guild of America nomination for Outstanding Directorial Achievement for The Judge and the General, (a feature-length documentary film about the personal transformation of Chilean Judge Juan Guzmán as he tries to bring Augusto Pinochet to justice for human rights crimes), co-produced by Farnsworth and co-producer/director Patricio Lanfranco.
- 2009 – Emmy Awards nomination for Best Historical Documentary for The Judge and the General, co-produced by Farnsworth and co-producer/director Patricio Lanfranco.

== Select interviews of Farnsworth ==
- "A New Life in the United States after "Thanh's War"". Fresh Air with Terry Gross & Tonya Mosely (Interview). Interviewed by Terry Gross. Philadelphia: PBS, WHYY. April 15, 1991.
- "Judge and the General - Elizabeth Farnsworth and Patricio Lanfranco - Behind the Lens, POV-PBS". pbs.org - POV (Interview). Interviewed by member of POV staff. Berkeley, CA: PBS News. October 29, 2015.
- "For a veteran NewsHour journalist, early loss defined her life's journeys". PBS News Hour, NewsHour Bookshelf (Interview). Interviewed by Jeffrey Brown. PBS News Hour. March 23, 2017.
- "Fractured: North Dakota's Oil Boom". WTTW, PBS, Science & Nature (Interview). Interviewed by Christine Hurley. WTTW, PBS Chicago: PBS. July 31, 2017.
- "KPR Presents: Elizabeth Farnsworth, Last Light". Kansas Public Radio (KPR) Presents (Interview). Interviewed by Laura Lorson. Lawrence, KS: Kansas Public Radio. May 30, 2024.
- "Grey Matter with Michael Krasny, Elizabeth Farnsworth – A Woman of Distinction". Grey Matter with Michael Krasny (podcast) (Interview). Interviewed by Michael Krasny. Novato, CA: Apple Inc. September 26, 2024.

== Select interviews by Farnsworth ==
- Shimon Peres (Israeli Prime Minister), "Elizabeth Farnsworth interviews Minister Peres of Israel". PBS NewsHour with Jim Lehrer (Interview). Interviewed by Elizabeth Farnsworth. Blair House, Washington DC: American Archive of Public Broadcasting. April 29, 1996.
- 14th Dalai Lama (spiritual leader of the Tibetan people), "Elizabeth Farnsworth interviews Dalai Lama - (view at 47:50 point)". PBS NewsHour with Jim Lehrer (Interview). Interviewed by Elizabeth Farnsworth. Washington DC: American Archive of Public Broadcasting. April 22, 1997.
- Renée Fleming (opera star), "Diva In Demand, Elizabeth Farnsworth talks to soprano Renee Fleming - (view at 41:02 point)". PBS NewsHour with Jim Lehrer (Interview). Interviewed by Elizabeth Farnsworth. WETA-TV, Washington, D.C.: American Archive of Public Broadcasting. October 13, 1999.
- Henry Kissinger (American diplomat), "Kissinger On Chile, Pinochet". Online NewsHour (Interview). Interviewed by Elizabeth Farnsworth. PBS.org, NewsHour with Jim Lehrer. February 6, 2001.
- Amos Oz (Israeli writer), "Coping with Conflict: Israeli Author Amos Oz". PBS NewsHour (Interview). Interviewed by Elizabeth Farnsworth. PBS.org, NewsHour. January 23, 2002.

== Selected works ==
- Elizabeth Farnsworth "Last Light" (Berkeley, California, 2024) ISBN 978-1953583819
- Elizabeth Farnsworth A train through time (Berkeley, California, 2017) ISBN 978-1-61902-601-8
