= Elizabeth Barret =

American documentary filmmaker (1951–2026)

Elizabeth Barret (November 14, 1951 – February 3, 2026) was an American documentary filmmaker. She was best known for documenting Appalachia and Eastern Kentucky through her work at Appalshop. She was also the founding director of the Appalshop Archive. Barret died on February 3, 2026, at the age of 74.

== Filmography ==
- Nature's Way (1973)
- Quilting Women (1976)
- Hand Carved (1980)
- Coalmining Women (1982)
- Long Journey Home (1987)
- Stranger with a Camera (2000)
- Portraits and Dreams (2020)

== Awards ==
- 2000 Sundance Film Festival - Nominated, Grand Jury Prize - Documentary
- 2000 International Documentary Association - Nominated, IDA Award - Feature Documentaries
- 2000 San Francisco International Film Festival - Won, Silver Spire, Film & Video - History
- 2012: Guggenheim Fellowship for Creative Arts - Photography from the John Simon Guggenheim Memorial Foundation, with Wendy Ewald, for Portraits and Dreams: A Revisitation
