= Waging a Living =

- Directed by: Roger Weisberg
- Produced by: Roger Weisberg
- Cinematography: Slawomir Grunberg
- Edited by: Sandra Christie, Lewis Erskine, Christopher White
- Music by: Richard Fiocca
- Release date: March 12, 2005 (Cinequest Film Festival)
- Running time: 85 minutes
- Language: English

Waging a Living is a 2004 documentary film that addresses the issue of the American dream and whether or not hard work will invariably improve your condition. Examining the lives of four Americans in California and the Northeast who work full-time jobs but are still having trouble making ends meet.

Waging a Living was produced and directed by Roger Weisberg and aired on PBS in 2006 as part of its Point of View series. It was met with high critical acclaim, winning Best Documentary at the New Jersey Film Festival and receiving a 92% "Fresh" rating on Rotten Tomatoes.
