= Standing Silent Nation =

- Directed by: Suree Towfighnia
- Produced by: Courtney Hermann
- Edited by: Sharon Karp
- Release date: July 3, 2007 (POV/American Documentary)
- Country: United States
- Language: English

Standing Silent Nation is a 2007 documentary film about Alex White Plume, a resident of South Dakota's Pine Ridge Reservation. After a great deal of research, Alex and his family planted industrial hemp, under the incorrect assumption that tribal sovereignty laws would allow the production of this non-psychoactive relative of marijuana, and the film details the consequences of his actions.

Standing Silent Nation appeared in The New York Times on July 3, 2007 in the review, "The battle over hemp on an Indian reservation."

Standing Silent Nation was directed by Suree Towfighnia, Produced by Courtney Hermann, and aired as part of PBS's Point of View series in 2007.

Standing Silent Nation was featured at the Smithsonian Institution's National Museum of the American Indian (NMAI) from July 3 to July 10, 2008 as part of the museum's independent film programming.

== Project funders ==
Standing Silent Nation is made possible with the support of Native American Public Telecommunications, the Paul Robeson Fund for Independent Media, the Playboy Foundation, and many others who have donated to the project over the years.

== Awards ==
The documentary was awarded Red Nation Film Festival awards for Best Director, Best Producer, and Best Documentary in 2009.

To celebrate its 40th anniversary, Vision Maker Media (originally founded in 1976 as the Native American Public Broadcasting Consortium) partnered with the American Archive of Public Broadcasting to preserve and showcase 40 foundational public television films. The resulting collection, "40 Years, 40 Films, 40 Weeks," included Standing Silent Nation.
