= Ping Pong (2012 film) =

- Directed by: Anson Hartford; Hugh Hartford
- Release date: 2012
- Running time: 80 minutes
- Country: Canada

Ping Pong (Never too old for gold) is a 2012 documentary film, that follows eight pensioners from around the world as they train for and compete in the over 80's table tennis world championship in Inner Mongolia. The film's world premiere took place at Hot Docs Canadian International Documentary Festival in Toronto. It has since appeared at Sheffield Doc/Fest (and was pitched at the Doc/Fest's 2010 MeetMarket), DMZ International Documentary Film Festival, Zurich Film Festival, Calgary International Film Festival, Warsaw International Film Festival, Mumbai Film Festival, Guelph Festival of Moving Media, and San Francisco Doc Fest. The film opened in the UK with a theatrical release on 6 July 2012 and has since been shown at cinemas across the UK. It premiered in the US at DOC NYC in November 2012.

== Cast ==
- Director - Hugh Hartford
- Producer - Anson Hartford
- Executive Producer - Beadie Finzi
- Executive Producer - Maxyne Franklin

== Critical reception ==
Ping Pong received a very positive reception from critics. Total Film said it was "sincerely moving", while the Empire described it as "delightful, hilarious and completely inspiring".
