= Living with AIDS =

- Directed by: Tina Di Feliciantonio
- Distributed by: PBS
- Release date: 1988

Living with AIDS is a 1987 documentary film directed by Tina Di Feliciantonio that achieved some recognition and awards within the film industry and earned Di Feliciantonio an Emmy. Part of the AIDS Film Project, it was one of the first films broadcast on PBS about AIDS when it premiered on July 19, 1988. The film tells the story of Todd Coleman and the people who cared for him during his final weeks.

Coleman moved from Denver to San Francisco at the age of 16 and was diagnosed with AIDS at 21. Di Feliciantonio was a graduate student at Stanford and decided to film his care as a way of showing the world another side of the AIDS epidemic.
