= Julia Meltzer =

American video artist and director (born 1968)

Julia Meltzer (born 1968) is an American video artist and director.

== Early life and education ==
Meltzer was born in Hollywood, California, in 1968. She received her BA from Brown University and she received her MFA from Rensselaer Polytechnic Institute.

== Career ==
Julia Meltzer is the founder and director of a non-profit arts organization called Clockshop located in Los Angeles that focuses on creating projects and organizations for the public. Meltzer and her usual collaborator, David Thorne, a video artist, produce media-intensive projects such as videos, photographs, and installations. Their works from 1993-2003 have been focused on history, secrecy, and memory. After 2003, Julia Meltzer and David Thorne have focused on the ways people envision the future and how it is claimed, realized, or even relinquished. Predominantly, their works focus on the relation to faith and global politics. Julia Meltzer and David Thorne's collaborated works have been featured in the 2008 Whitney Biennial. Among their most visible projects is The Speculative Archive, a collection of recorded videos that are focused on the metamorphosis of cultural practices as displayed in documents, objects, and memories for Public Record, an online archive that works as a channel for organizations and the public.

Meltzer has received grants from Art Matters, the Louis Comfort Tiffany Foundation, the Rockefeller Media Arts Fellowship Fund, and the John Simon Memorial Guggenheim Foundation Fellowship. She was a Fulbright fellow in Damascus, Syria in 2005–06 and a Guggenheim fellow in 2009-10. Meltzer has received a Fulbright fellowship to work in the West Bank in 2014. Meltzer has taught at the University of California, Irvine and Hampshire College.

The Light in Her Eyes is a documentary that follows the life of a woman named Houda al-Habash, exploring the stereotypes surrounding Muslims and offering a perspective on Syria's Arab Spring protests.

Featured in the 2008 Whitney Biennial, Epic, a 7-minute film, is focused on a Syrian performer named Rami Farah. Farah delivers five speeches on a variety of topics, speaking in Arabic with English subtitles. His speeches blend topics such as war and political oppression with allegory and poetry.

We Don't Like it as it is But We Don't Know What We Want it to Be is a video set in Syria about the views of people who oppose the U.S. foreign policies in Syria and neighboring regions. The ending of the video shows Meltzer and Thorne looking for a structure that represents the political condition of Syria. They found it in the Marquez Basel al-Asad, a combination of a hotel and a mosque, with many conflicting stories about its history.

== Personal life ==
Meltzer resides in Los Angeles, California and is married to David Thorne.

== Major works ==
=== In collaboration with David Thorne ===
- Free the, Demand Your, We Want, All the Power to the, We Must, Stop the, End All, Don't Fuck the, The People Will, You Can't, Those Who, Women Are, If You, Resistance Is: some positions and slogans recollected from an archive of political posters (print, 2002)
- It’s not my memory of it: three recollected documents (video, 2003)
- We will live to see these things, or, five pictures of what may come to pass (video, 2005–06)
- Not a matter of if but when: brief records of a time in which expectations were repeatedly raised and lowered and people grew exhausted from never knowing if the moment was at hand or still to come (video, 2006)
- As though there were nothing else on the drawing board (print, 2006)
- We don't like it as it is but we don't know what we want it to be (video, 2006)
- Take into the air my quiet breath (video, 2007)
- In Possession of a Picture (print, 2006–present)
- epic(malhame) (video, 2008)

=== Solo projects ===
- POV, The Light in Her Eyes 2012 1 episode of a TV series (producer, director, cinematographer 2012)
