= My Love, Don't Cross That River =

- Theatrical poster
- Directed by: Jin Mo-young
- Produced by: Han Gyeong-su
- Starring: Jo Byeong-man; Kang Kye-yeol
- Cinematography: Jin Mo-young
- Edited by: Hyun Jin-sik
- Music by: Jeong Min-woo
- Production company: Argus Film
- Distributed by: CGV Art House; Daemyung Culture Factory
- Release dates: November 2013 (DMZ Docs); November 27, 2014 (South Korea)
- Running time: 85 minutes
- Country: South Korea
- Language: Korean
- Budget: US$110,000
- Box office: US$34.3 million

My Love, Don't Cross That River (Korean: 님아, 그 강을 건너지 마오) is a 2013 South Korean documentary film that follows elderly married couple Jo Byeong-man and Kang Kye-yeol until the last moments of their 76-year marriage. Documentary filmmaker Jin Mo-young filmed Jo and Kang in the couple's mountain village in Hoengseong County, Gangwon Province for 15 months.

My Love, Don't Cross That River premiered at the 2013 DMZ International Documentary Film Festival, where it won the Audience Award. It was released in theaters on 27 November 2014 and through word of mouth became the most commercially successful Korean documentary/independent film of all time.

== Production ==
Married couple, 98-year-old Jo Byeong-man and 89-year-old Kang Kye-yeol, were first featured onscreen in a five-episode segment titled Gray-haired Lovers on a KBS television documentary program that aired in 2011. After documentary filmmaker Jin Mo-young saw Jo and Kang on TV, he rushed to the couple's mountain village in Hoengseong County, Gangwon Province and asked them if he could make their story into a possible film. After obtaining their permission in September 2012, Jin followed the couple for 15 months and documented their everyday life.

== Reception ==
Upon its theatrical release on 27 November 2014, the film became the most commercially successful Korean independent film of all time in terms of revenue and attendance.

=== Box office ===
In South Korea, the film topped the box office during its opening weekend with ₩5.13 billion (US$4.66 million) ahead of its competition, Hollywood films Interstellar, Exodus: Gods and Kings and The Theory of Everything. It was the second time ever and the first time in five years that a documentary film had topped the Korean box office since Old Partner opened at No. 1 in 2009. It has so far grossed ₩8.38 billion (US$7.62 million) in 15 days, which is 70 times its production budget of ₩120 million (US$110,000). As of January 2015, the film drew 3.73 million admissions, beating Old Partner's record (2.93 million) to become the highest grossing Korean independent/documentary film of all time.

=== Critical reception ===
My Love, Don't Cross That River has received mostly positive reviews from critics. Review aggregator Rotten Tomatoes gives the film an approval rating of 84%, based on 25 reviews, with an average rating of 6.5/10. On Metacritic, the film has a score of 68 out of 100, based on 8 critics, indicating "generally favorable reviews".

Frank Scheck of The Hollywood Reporter gave a positive review calling it "the cinematic equivalent of marriage counseling."

=== Film festivals ===
Aside from DMZ Docs, the film was also invited to screen at the Moscow International Film Festival, Hot Docs Canadian International Documentary Festival, the Sydney Film Festival, and the Los Angeles Film Festival in 2015.

=== Awards and nominations ===
Year	Award	Category	Recipient	Result
2014	DMZ International Documentary Film Festival	Audience Award	My Love, Don't Cross That River	Won
2015	6th KOFRA Film Awards	Best Independent Film	My Love, Don't Cross That River	Won
2015	10th Max Movie Awards	Best Film	My Love, Don't Cross That River	Nominated
2015	10th Max Movie Awards	Best Director	Jin Mo-young	Nominated
2015	10th Max Movie Awards	Best Trailer	My Love, Don't Cross That River	Nominated
2015	10th Max Movie Awards	Best Poster	My Love, Don't Cross That River	Won
2015	51st Baeksang Arts Awards	Best New Director	Jin Mo-young	Nominated
2015	Hot Docs Canadian International Documentary Festival	Audience Award		4th place
2015	21st Los Angeles Film Festival	Documentary Award	My Love, Don't Cross That River	Won
