= Mark Birnbaum =

American producer, director and editor

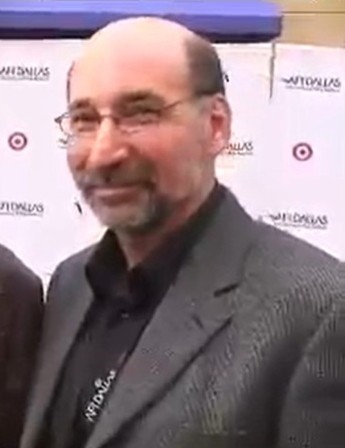
- Birnbaum in 2008
- Awards: Peabody Broadcasting Award, Best Documentary, Universe Multicultural Film Festival, Best Documentary, Deep Ellum Film Festival, Grand Festival Award – Documentary, Berkeley Video & Film Festival, Insight Award, National Association of Film and Media Artists
- Website: http://www.markbirnbaum.com/

Mark Birnbaum is an American producer, director and editor, who has made a number of documentaries. Birnbaum began making films while serving in the United States Army as a photographer and filmmaker in Vietnam.

== Stop The Presses ==
Stop The Presses is a 2008 film which discussed how the Internet has changed the nature of print journalism. Notable journalists were interviewed, including Ben Bradlee, Dave Barry, and David Carr, current New York Times media columnist. The Dallas Observer referred to the movie as “surprisingly inspiring, as it points to the inevitable reinvention of an industry in need of new life.” Washington City Paper called the movie “informative, gripping, entertaining, and depressing”.

The movie was shown at multiple film festivals throughout the United States, including the Denver Film Festival, where it was shown at the Denver Newspaper Agency building.

== The Big Buy: How Tom DeLay Stole Congress ==
Mark Birnbaum and Jim Schermbeck co-directed this 2006 75-minute movie, which focused on the Texas criminal investigation of Representative Tom DeLay, the former House majority leader, which eventually led to his downfall. The movie was produced by liberal moviemaker Hollywood producer Robert Greenwald. The documentary attracted attention and controversy.

A New York Times critic said the movie “presents its evidence clearly and with a welcome sense of humor.” DeLay refused to interview for the movie, and called it worthless.

== Slant 45:The Movie ==
In 2011, SLANT 45 The Movie, a 90-minute documentary was produced which followed seven teams of children participating in various community service efforts throughout Texas. SLANT 45 – Service Learning Adventures in North Texas – was a youth community service program created by The North Texas Super Bowl XLV Host Committee, and Birnbaum was chosen to make the movie by the Super Bowl XLV host committee and numerous celebrities attended the Texas Premier of the movie.

The film featured interviews with former President George W. Bush, his wife Laura Bush and others, and launched in front of attendees including Daryl Johnston, Hall of Fame quarterback Roger Staubach and Super Bowl XLV Host Committee President & CEO Bill Lively.

== The Harp Tree ==
The Harp Tree is a 2009 short film about the sons of Holocaust survivors who traveled throughout Europe trying to find information about family members who were killed by the Nazis.

== Swingman ==
Swingman is a September 2012 movie, the latest documentary by Mark Birnbaum, about paralyzed Texas Fire Department Captain Marshall Allen who overcome injury and continues working at the Fort Worth Fire Department. The movie is based upon a book by Alexandra Allred "Swingman: What a Difference a Decade Makes."
