= State of Denial (film) =

2003 documentary film

- Directed by: Elaine Epstein
- Produced by: Elaine Epstein
- Cinematography: Sven Cheatle, Carl DeHeer, Brian Green, Eddie Wes
- Edited by: Penny Hays
- Music by: Thomas DeRenzo
- Release date: 2003
- Running time: 86 minutes
- Language: English

State of Denial is a 2003 documentary film about AIDS in Africa, produced and directed by Elaine Epstein. The film highlights the errors of President Mbeki's government, which insists that there isn't enough evidence to show that HIV causes AIDS and refuses vital life-saving drugs to their people because of unknown long-term risks. The film follows the stories of HIV positive Africans and activists as well as their careers, interspersed with the harrowing statistics of the AIDS epidemic in Africa. It features various HIV positive patients coping with the disease in times when the use of ARV medicine was strongly discouraged by the South African government.

The film captures the desperation and growing discontent of average South Africans infected and affected by the disease. Some of the subjects interviewed make heartbreaking but inspirational statements about AIDS and how living with it is like. After the death of his brother who also succumbed to the disease, a young man is filmed saying the following:

For me, it was the most traumatic time in my life because I could see myself in him. You know, he didn’t really have to die as helplessly as he did. And not only him, but thousands and thousands of people are dying unnecessarily. It makes me sick.

The film also features Zackie Achmat, an HIV positive AIDS activist and co-founder of Treatment Action Campaign (TAC), who refused to take ARVs until they were made available to the general public.

State of Denial was first shown at the 2003 Sundance Film Festival. It later aired on TV as part of the Acclaimed Point of View Documentary Film Series. Four of the subjects interviewed died before the film was released.

== See also ==
- AIDS denialism, a movement challenging the scientific consensus that HIV causes AIDS.
