= Paul Stekler =

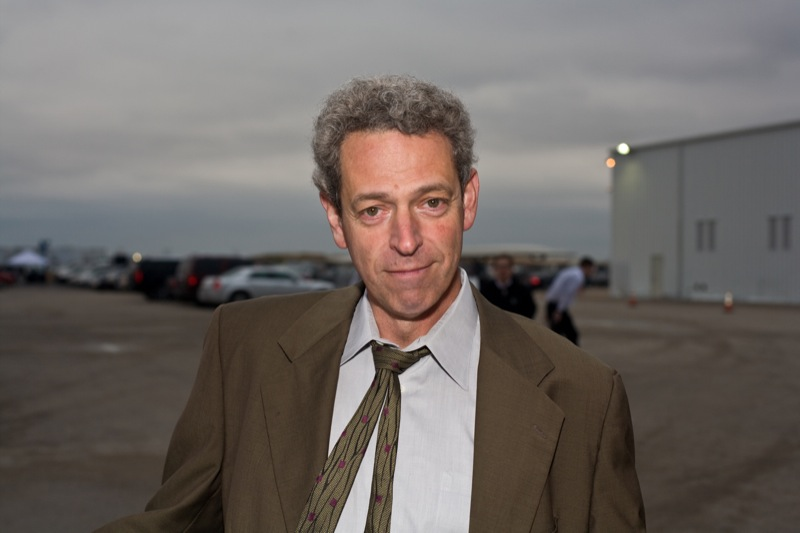
Paul Stekler at the Texas Film Hall of Fame Awards 2009

Paul J. Stekler (born January 3, 1953) is a political documentary filmmaker, a professor, and former chair and head of the production program in the Department of Radio-Television-Film at the University of Texas at Austin College of Communication. Known for his documentary films about American politics, he was also the on-camera advisor to the cast of The Real World Austin during their attempt to create a documentary about the South by Southwest Music Festival (2005–2006). Among other major filmmaking awards, he has earned two Peabody, three Columbia/duPont, three national Emmy awards, and a Special Jury Award at the Sundance Film Festival.

== Career ==
Raised in Glen Rock, New Jersey, Stekler graduated from Glen Rock High School in 1970 and received a bachelor's degree from Williams College. He obtained his PhD from Harvard University in 1982 and taught at Tulane University in New Orleans. During that time, he worked as a political pollster on a number of campaigns and began making films. His first documentary, Hands That Picked Cotton (1985), about black grassroots politics in the Mississippi delta, was based on his PhD dissertation, "Black Politics in the New South". His second film, Among Brothers: Black Politics in New Orleans (1987), focused a campaign for mayor between two African-American candidates. Both films were aired nationally on PBS and led to Henry Hampton, the executive producer of Blackside's Eyes on the Prize series, to hire him as a director for Eyes II (1990). His primary film there, about Dr. Martin Luther King's last year, The Promised Land 1967–68, was co-produced by Jackie Shearer.

Stekler's first collaboration with Louis Alvarez and Andrew Kolker (The Center for New American Media), friends from New Orleans, was Louisiana Boys: Raised on Politics (1991), which aired on PBS's POV series. The film examines the colorful, Byzantine political culture of Louisiana, from the days of Huey Long up to the present. It won an Alfred I. duPont-Columbia University Journalism Award and was nominated for an Emmy. It was described in The Boston Globe as a "look at the flamboyant political history of the Bayou State, (that’s) every bit as insightful as it is entertaining," a "sassy yet serious review of the revels" by The New York Times, "marvelously entertaining" by the Texas Observer, and as "tragicomic… replete with the kind of imagery and sound-bites that incite voters to term limitations, if not revolution."

Last Stand at Little Bighorn (1992), made for The American Experience series for PBS, was a collaboration with Native-American novelist James Welch (Winter in the Blood, Fools Crow). The film explores the creation of the myth of Custer's Last Stand by focusing on the larger context of the American conquest of the West, using the voices of both sides of that conflict, Native American and white. The Emmy Award film was described by the Chicago Tribune as a "fine experience… allowing us to hear the story of the battle from the Native-American perspective," by The New York Times as "a moving and intelligent contribution," and in The Boston Globe as "Custer wouldn’t have believed it – an Indian collaborating with a white man to write, and right the history."

Following the success of making a film about politics and culture in Louisiana, Alvarez, Kolker and Stekler expanded their scope to the entire country in Vote for Me: Politics in America (1996), a four-hour, two night national special on PBS. Exploring Chicago ethnic politics, the Texas legislature, organizing in old age communities in south Florida, and creating media events in California, the series was described as a "a landslide of an election special" by the Los Angeles Times, "the standout in a season of documentaries" by the Chicago Tribune, "pure Americana, merry and marvelous and authentic" by USA Today, "the best four credit course on real politics you could ever take" by Roll Call, and, by The Atlanta Journal-Constitution, as "a masterpiece, unmatched by anything you'll see this political season in the breadth and depth with which it makes you laugh, makes you enraged and – most remarkable of all – makes you care about politics." The last hour and a half, film within a film (The Political Education of Maggie Lauterer) follows an inexperienced local TV reporter and singer who runs for congress. The series won an Emmy, Columbia-duPont, and a Peabody, whose committee called the it "a glimpse of our system that ultimately turns the surprising trick of making viewers more appreciative of and less cynical about the political process."

In 2000, Stekler and Daniel McCabe received the Special Jury Prize at the Sundance Film Festival for the three-hour documentary "George Wallace: Settin' the Woods on Fire." Based on Dan Carter's Wallace biography, The Politics of Rage, about the four-time candidate for the presidency and Alabama governor for nearly two decades, it aired as a two night American Experience special. The film was called "stunning and probing," "stunning and probing,"and "boisterous" by The New York Times, "a full-blown Shakespearean saga... riveting" by the Houston Chronicle, "a brilliant achievement" by the Memphis Commercial Appeal, "a remarkable documentary" by the National Journal, "mesmerizing" by The Boston Globe, and a "gripping documentary, fluent, explosive… swift-paced and seamless" by the Toronto Star. Newsday said it "sets the television on fire," while The Wall Street Journal wrote that the film was a "documentary filled with enough drama and dark comedy, wry twists of fate and fortune, corruption of the spirit and of the body politic, sin and salvation to make fans of ‘The Sopranos’ forget for a while." And the Texas Observer wrote that the film was "an epic political biography... makes most fictional films seem thin and lifeless by comparison." The film won an Emmy and was included as one of the films in the 2001 Academy Awards Oscar Night "Tribute to Documentaries."

Stekler was nominated by the Writers Guild of America (WGA) in 2004 for outstanding achievement in television writing for his documentary film "Last Man Standing: Politics Texas Style" which aired nationally on the PBS series "P.O.V." The documentary is about a contest for Texas state representative in Lyndon Johnson's old hometown between a GOP Christian conservative incumbent and his 24-year-old Democratic challenger that highlights the 2002 battle, across the Lone Star state, between George W. Bush's ascendant Texas Republicans and a multi-cultural Democratic ticket headed by a Mexican-American gubernatorial candidate and an African-American candidate for United States Senate. Liz Smith wrote "this is grassroots politics, the lifeblood of the USA, as seldom seen before," The Washington Post called "absorbing" and "funny," The Dallas Morning News wrote "this is an artist at work," and John Leonard, in New York Magazine, wrote that "compared to the sound bites that pass for coverage on the networks and the yaps that pass for analysis on the primal-scream cable shows, this flying visit to a small election towers like De Tocqueville."

Stekler served as host and executive producer of the statewide PBS television series, "Special Session," which covered issues and politics confronting during the 2005 and 2007 sessions of the Texas State Legislature. He was the co-executive producer on Margaret Brown's "Be Here To Love Me: A Film About Townes Van Zandt" (2004) and a consulting producer on Peter Frumkin's "Woody Guthrie: Ain’t Got No Home" (2006). In 2008, Stekler co-produced and co-wrote Frontline's "The Choice", about the Obama/McCain race, with director Mike Kirk and Jim Gilmore.

In 2013, Stekler reunited with Alvarez, Kolker, and editor/producer Peter Odabashian on "Getting Back to Abnormal" (gettingbacktoabnormal.com), a film about New Orleans politics five years after Katrina. The film premiered at the SXSW film festival and aired on PBS's POV series. The Los Angeles Times described it as "poetry… every frame is full of life", The New Orleans Advocate called it "raucous and brilliant", The Boston Globe said it "embodies all the drama of living life in post-racial America," "an entertaining portrayal of New Orleans in all its glorious dysfunction" wrote the Austin American-Statesman, The Washington Post said "a fabulous introduction to N’awlins-style politics," and the National Journal called it "a film unlike any you have ever seen before."

In 2016, the Alvarez, Kolker and Stekler team executive produced Postcards from the Great Divide (http://www.politicalpostcards.org/the-films), nine short films about politics in nine states that illustrated the American political divide. The films were made for the Washington Post's website and later aired on PBS. They ranged from the disappearance of white rural Democrats in Kentucky, the challenge of getting out the Mexican-American vote in Texas, and the ideological and partisan sorting of people, inspired by Bill Bishop's The Big Sort", in Minnesota.

== Filmography ==
- "Hands That Picked Cotton: Black Politics in Today's Rural South" (1985) (produced, directed and written with Alan Bell)
- "Among Brothers: Black Politics in New Orleans" (1987) (produced, directed and written by Paul Stekler)
- "Eyes on the Prize II" (2 episodes, 1990) "The Keys to the Kingdom: 1974–80" and "The Promised Land: 1967–68" (producer, director, writer with Jackie Shearer)
- "Louisiana Boys: Raised on Politics" (1991) (producer, director, writer with Louis Alvarez and Andrew Kolker)
- "Last Stand at Little Bighorn" (1992) (producer/director, written with James Welch)
- "Vote for Me: Politics in America" (1996) (producer, director, writer with Louis Alvarez and Andrew Kolker)
- "George Wallace: Settin' the Woods on Fire" (2000) (producer, director, writer with Daniel McCabe, co-writer Steve Fayer)
- "Be Here to Love Me: A Film About Townes Van Zandt" (2004) (executive producer for director Margaret Brown)
- "Last Man Standing: Politics Texas Style" (2004) (TV) (producer, director)
- "Woody Guthrie: Ain’t Got No Home" (2006) (consulting producer for director Peter Frumkin)
- Frontline's "The Choice" (2008) (co-producer and co-writer with director Mike Kirk and Jim Gilmore)
- "Getting Back to Abnormal" (2012) (producer/director with Louis Alvarez, Andy Kolker and Peter Odabashian)
- "Postcards from the Great Divide" (2016) (executive produced with Louis Alvarez and Andrew Kolker)
