= Marc N. Weiss =

Marc N. Weiss is an American documentary producer who is best known as the creator and first executive producer of P.O.V.. He founded the nonprofit internet think tank Web Lab in 1997 and later became active in climate and social justice organizing in New York and nationally.

== Career ==
=== Early career ===
Weiss grew up in Queens, New York.. He began his career in the early 1970s as a documentary filmmaker, directing the short The Revolutionary Was a Cop: Tommy the Traveler in 1971.

Weiss was a founding board member of the Association of Independent Video and Filmmakers (AIVF), which formed in 1974. He later left the organization in 1979, as according to him, he was mostly ostracized. In 1980, he co-founded Media Network, a nonprofit clearinghouse for information about social-issue films.

=== Film ===
Weiss conceived P.O.V. in the 1980s in response to what he saw as limited PBS support for independently produced documentaries during the Reagan era. After PBS initially rejected the proposal, he resubmitted it to the Corporation for Public Broadcasting with a list of documentaries that had never been shown on PBS.

Weiss served as executive producer until 1995. During his tenure, the series received Peabody, duPont-Columbia, and Emmy Awards, while several films it presented received Academy Award recognition. P.O.V. also aired films including Marlon Riggs's Tongues Untied (1991) and Tom Joslin and Peter Friedman's Silverlake Life: The View from Here (1993).

In 2011, Weiss co-produced two HBO documentaries: When Strangers Click: Five Stories from the Internet, directed by Robert Kenner, and Gun Fight, directed by Barbara Kopple. He also served as executive producer on documentaries including Berkeley in the Sixties (1990), Days of Waiting (1991), Thank You and Good Night (1991), Orgasm, Inc. (2011), and A Fierce Green Fire (2012).

=== Internet work ===
In 1993, Weiss began exploring ways to use the web to extend public engagement with issues raised by P.O.V. documentaries. He stepped down as executive producer in 1995 to launch P.O.V. Interactive.

The 1996 project Re:Vietnam: Stories Since the War was an early crowdsourced documentary website. In 1997, Weiss founded Web Lab, a New York-based nonprofit that developed experimental projects exploring the internet's potential for public dialogue and civic engagement.

Web Lab projects included American Love Stories, Need.com, and "Small Group Dialogues," a structured format for high-quality, time-limited online conversations among strangers.

=== Activism ===
In 2012, Weiss shifted much of his focus from media work to climate and environmental advocacy. He joined the board of the Sierra Club Foundation and served as a volunteer co-lead of the Sierra Club's Beyond Dirty Fuels campaign, including efforts opposing the Keystone XL pipeline.

In New York, Weiss co-founded NY Renews, a coalition of community, labor, and environmental groups that was the moving force behind the landmark Climate Leadership and Community Protection Act, enacted in 2019. He has been a member of the coalition's steering committee since its founding in 2015.

He also serves on the board of The Natural History Museum, a traveling organization focused on climate and environmental justice.
