= Color Adjustment =

- Directed by: Marlon Riggs
- Written by: Marlon Riggs
- Produced by: Vivian Kleiman; Marlon Riggs
- Cinematography: Michael Anderson Rick Butler
- Edited by: Deborah Hoffmann
- Music by: Mary Watkins
- Production company: Signifyin' Works
- Distributed by: California Newsreel
- Release date: 1992
- Running time: 86 minutes
- Country: United States
- Language: English

Color Adjustment is a 1992 documentary film that traces 40 years of race relations and the representation of African Americans through the lens of prime-time television entertainment, scrutinizing television's racial myths. Narrated by Ruby Dee, it is a sequel to Riggs’s Ethnic Notions, this time examining racial stereotypes in the broadcast age.

== Content ==
Examining American television's most popular stars and shows, including Amos 'n' Andy, Beulah, The Nat King Cole Show, Julia, The Jeffersons, Good Times, Roots, The Cosby Show, Frank's Place, and others, Riggs outlines a history of the race conflict as reflected in television. It asserts that African Americans were allowed into America's prime-time family only insofar as their presence didn't challenge the mythology of the American Dream central to television's merchandising function. It demonstrates how the television networks managed to absorb divisive racial conflict into the familiar non-threatening formats of prime-time television.

However, the sitcoms surrounding African-American characters did not reflect the actual societal values of the time, retreating from the conflict surrounding the Civil Rights Movement and pretending that society was "colorless." Clips from the shows are interwoven with the parallel story of the Civil Rights Movement as presented on the evening news. Writers and producers—such as Hal Kanter, Norman Lear, Steven Bochco, David Wolper and others—take viewers behind the scenes of their creations. Esther Rolle, Diahann Carroll, Tim Reid, and other Black performers reflect on the roles they played in shaping prime-time race relations. Cultural critics Henry Louis Gates, Jr., Herman Gray, Alvin Poussaint, and Patricia Turner suggest that, while these television programs entertained, they reinforced and validated a particular notion of the "American Family."

== Reception ==
Color Adjustment was met with critical praise, receiving a Peabody Award and being nominated for the Grand Jury Prize at Sundance. It was also aired as part of the P.O.V. series on PBS. The film was awarded the Independent Documentary Association's Outstanding Achievement Award and the Organization of American Historians' Erik Barnouw Award. It also received a National Emmy Award Nomination for Outstanding Individual Achievement in Research.

== Reception ==
On review aggregator website Rotten Tomatoes, the film holds an approval rating of 80% based on 5 reviews, with an average rating of 6.0/10.

== See also ==
- Tongues Untied
- Bamboozled - a 2000 narrative film by Spike Lee about the portrayal of Black people in the media
