= Barris (surname) =

Barris is a surname. Notable people with the surname include:

- Alex Barris (1922–2004), American-born Canadian television actor and writer
- Chuck Barris (1929–2017), American game show producer and presenter
- George Barris, several people
- Harry Barris (1905–1962), American singer
- Kenya Barris (born 1973), American film and television writer, producer, director, and actor
- Macarena Gomez-Barris, Chilean interdisciplinary scholar, writer, and academic
- Marti Barris (1937–1995), American actress and singer
- Peter Barris, American businessman and venture capitalist
- Ted Barris (born 1949), Canadian writer and broadcaster
- Tomás Barris (1930–2023), Spanish middle-distance runner

== See also ==
- Barris (disambiguation)
