= Seymour Fromer =

American museum founder

Seymour Fromer (October 3, 1922 – October 25, 2009) was an American co-founder of the Judah L. Magnes Museum in Berkeley, California. Fromer co-founded the museum, which houses 11,000 Jewish artifacts, one of the largest collections in the United States, with his wife, Rebecca Fromer, in a Berkeley mansion in 1962. He remained the director the Judah L. Magnes Museum until his retirement in 1998.

Fromer was born in the Bronx on October 3, 1922. He attended both Brooklyn College and Columbia University for his education. He worked as a school administrator in New Jersey, before moving to the Los Angeles area in the 1950s. He later moved to Oakland, California.

Seymour (in partnership with his spouse Rebecca Camhi Fromer) dedicated his life to retrieving and preserving the art and artifacts of Jewish daily life, culture, and religion. Among the numerous artists and artisans whose careers and projects he helped launch and whose crafts he helped preserve:

- Deborah Kaufman, who birthed the first Jewish Film Festival
- Vivian Kleiman, a Peabody Award-winning producer of the first professional documentary film on the Jewish Diaspora (Routes of Exile: A Moroccan Jewish Odyssey)
- Lev Liberman and his band, The Klezmorim, the world's first Klezmer revival band
- David Moss who revived the art of Hebrew calligraphy and contemporary Ketubah design
- Victor Ries, a Jewish metalsmith and silversmith whose work includes the entrance gate to the original Magnes Museum property
- Janet _____(?), who helped preserve the art of Jewish Yemenite silver jewelry making

Among the projects that Seymour and Rebecca created:

- cataloguing the treasure trove of Yiddish records salvaged from dumpsters
- collecting libraries of Yiddish books from the homes of Jewish chicken farmers in Petaluma, CA (among them Yiddish translations of Marx)
- retrieving Judaica poised to be discarded as Jewish life in various countries was diminishing, among them Morocco, Tunisia, Egypt, Czechoslovakia, India, and Central Europe

Seymour Fromer died at his home in Berkeley, California, on October 25, 2009, at the age of 87. He was survived by his wife, Rebecca Camhi Fromer, their daughter, Mira Z. Amiras, and two grandchildren. Rebecca Fromer died in January 2012.
