= Affirmations (film) =

1990 short film directed by Marlon Riggs

Affirmations is a ten-minute short film exploring black gay sexuality as well as the inclusion of black gays in the black community. The film was produced and directed by Marlon Riggs and released in 1990.

== Synopsis ==
Affirmations begins with a gay, black man recounting his first night with a lover. The man's name is Reginald T. Jackson. The story begins with Jackson sitting at a bar. The man sitting next to him wanted to pick him up, but Jackson did not want to go. When the man began to cry as he remembered a past lover, Jackson gave in and allowed himself to go home with the other man. They ended up making love the next morning. Jackson says, “It was the best experience I have ever had.”
Affirmations moves from Jackson's story to Harlem's African American Freedom Day. African American Freedom Day is a parade celebrating African American tradition. Affirmations documentation of the parade begins with mainstream images of Black culture. Drums, flutes and African American war veterans are all shown marching down the street in the parade. Portraits of Martin Luther King Jr., Frederick Douglass and Malcolm X are filmed floating down the center of the parade. Then a group of gay, black men come down the parade line. They are shouting, “Homophobia has to go!” They are followed by the Minority Task Force on AIDS. The film then documents a black man yelling at the pro-gay African American group from the side of the street. He screams, “You are not part of the African tradition.”
The following messages are then displayed in text on the screen: I dream a world where homosex, desire, affection, love, no longer invite prosecution. I dream an end to silences that kill. I dream a slave song, a freedom anthem, voices, ancient, yet alive, lifting my life, yours, to new visions of liberation. I dream freedom, no longer needing to ask or witness what happens to dreams deferred? As the text fades out the film concludes with gay African Americans expressing their dreams for kinship and the right to be included in the Black community. While they reveal their wishes, Hallelujah! plays in the background.

== Production team ==
Produced, Directed and Written by	Marlon Riggs
Edited by	Christiane Badgley
Featuring	Reginald T. Jackson and Gay Men of African Descent
Voices	R. Battle, Blackberri, Michael Bell, Essex Hemphill, Wayson Jones, David B. Kirkland, Alan Miller, Cornelius Moore, Colin Robinson, Britt Tennell, Donald Wodds

== Analysis ==
Riggs wrote in his essay “Tongues Retied”, which defended his documentary Tongues Untied, that his works “unabashedly celebrate” African American gay culture.

During the African American Freedom Parade images of Malcolm X are shown alongside Martin Luther King Jr. and Frederick Douglass. Although Riggs has often criticized the Black Nationalist agenda for excluding queerness from blackness, in his essay Black Macho Revisited Riggs Malcolm X after he got involved with the Nation of Islam for adopting a more multicultural view of the black community.

Riggs has often questioned how the black community, which was subject to exclusion from the white community for generations, could exclude its queer members. In Affirmations Riggs uses phrases commonly associated with the Civil Rights Movement (Langston Hughes’ "dreams deferred" or Martin Luther King Jr.’s "I Have a Dream"). This demonstrates to the audience that the struggles Blacks went through parallels the struggles queer African Americans are going through.

== Dedication ==
Affirmations was dedicated to the memory of Gene Garth. Gene Garth was an on-screen participant in Riggs’ film Tongues Untied.
