= Tom Joslin =

American independent filmmaker and teacher (1946–1990)

- Born: Thomas Hancock Joslin; November 29, 1946; Melrose, Massachusetts, U.S.
- Died: July 1, 1990 (aged 43); Silver Lake, California, U.S.
- Resting place: Puritan Lawn Memorial Park, Peabody, Essex County, Massachusetts, U.S.
- Education: University of New Hampshire, Rhode Island School of Design
- Notable work: Silverlake Life: The View From Here
- Movement: Autobiographical Documentary, American Avant-garde, Queer Cinema
- Partner: Mark Massi (1968–1990)

Tom Joslin (November 29, 1946 – July 1, 1990) was an American independent filmmaker and teacher best known for Silverlake Life: The View from Here (1993), a video diary about living and dying with AIDS. His earlier works include Blackstar: Autobiography of a Close Friend (1976) and The Architecture of the Mountains (1978, released posthumously in 2012).

== 1946–1974: Early life ==
Thomas Hancock Joslin was born in Melrose, Massachusetts, in 1946, the son of Charles Sumner Joslin, a U.S. Army veteran of World War II, and Mary Hall Kimball Joslin, a legal secretary in Boston. His parents operated the Turnpike Racquet Club in Plainville, Massachusetts, one of New England's first indoor tennis facilities. Joslin attended Cumberland High School in Rhode Island, where he was active in the Thespian Society and performed in several school plays.

He began making films at age 14, using a Super 8mm camera to recreate scenes from James Bond and Alfred Hitchcock films. He also collaborated frequently with classmate David Macaulay, who would later become a noted author and illustrator of children's books.

After graduating from high school, Joslin attended the University of New Hampshire, where he produced and directed several short films, including a spy-film homage The Courier (1966) and an unfinished documentary on the folk trio Peter, Paul and Mary. In 1968, he participated in the Flaherty Film Seminar, a weeklong program organized by Frances Flaherty in memory of her husband, documentary filmmaker Robert Flaherty, held at their family farm in Vermont. Joslin later described this event as a turning point in his career, marking a shift from narrative storytelling toward documentary and self-reflective filmmaking. He also dedicated his first feature to Willard Van Dyke, then director of the Flaherty Film Seminar.

While at the University of New Hampshire, Joslin began a relationship with fellow student Mark Massi. According to writer Bo Huston, "their famous story was that when they were lovers in college, Mark sat on a window-sill, crying hysterically, and stated that if Tom didn't love him, he'd jump." Joslin later earned an MFA from the Rhode Island School of Design, while Massi worked in video production at the New England Center for Continuing Education. They also ran a macrobiotic VW van, The Foot and Mouth, at UNH, and lived as a gay couple in Alchemedia, a commune they established in Barrington, New Hampshire.

== 1974–1976: Blackstar: Autobiography of a Close Friend ==
In 1974, Joslin began work on Blackstar: Autobiography of a Close Friend, a feature-length documentary about living and growing up as a gay filmmaker. Developed while he was a student at the Rhode Island School of Design, the film blends 8mm home movies, early short films, and found footage with interviews reflecting on his filmic evolution, his homosexuality, and his relationship with Massi.

The first half presents a portrait of Joslin's family history, primarily narrated by his parents and brothers, tracing their upper-middle-class origins from the 19th century to the director's childhood, which took place during the post-World War II period. The second half explores themes such as gay identity and family rejection through interviews with the same family members, who attempt to challenge the legitimacy of Tom and Mark's relationship. Joslin's coming-out is explored in one of the final scenes, where he recalls discovering a hidden note between two gay lovers in Arnold Mills, Rhode Island, near his parents’ home. The film concludes with Joslin and Massi performing a vaudeville number, lip-syncing to Laura Nyro and Labelle’s I Met Him on a Sunday.

Blackstar was first screened in 1976 at Harvard-Radcliffe in an early work-print stage. In Gay Community News, Michael Bronski described the film as "a glowing reminder that art and politics are not only compatible but intrinsic to one another", calling it "one of the best films about us that has yet been made". The film later received mixed reactions at the Flaherty Film Seminar. Additional screenings took place at MoMA’s Cineprobe, the RISD Auditorium and the Carpenter Center for the Visual Arts. In 1980, it was broadcast on WGBH’s Cold Nights, a showcase of independent filmmakers from the Boston area.

Although Blackstar was not widely known at the time, queer film historian Thomas Waugh later recognized it as one of the first gay autobiographical films, alongside Curt McDowell’s Confessions (1972) or Jan Oxenberg’s Home Movie (1973). Several scenes from it were later re-edited for Silverlake Life: The View from Here (1993).

== 1976–1981: The Architecture of the Mountains ==
After Blackstar, Joslin was offered a teaching position in the Film and Photography area at Hampshire College. The search committee included photographers Jerome Liebling and Elaine Mayes, who later became a close friend of the couple. At Hampshire, Joslin taught courses ranging from 8mm and 16mm film workshops, to a survey of 1960s cinema, as well as a seminar on LGBTQ+ film representation called Film Image-Gay, which featured historian and activist Vito Russo as a guest speaker. He also developed The Transformative Vision, a course inspired by Jose Argüelles’ book of the same name. His students included Peter Friedman, Bo Huston, Emily Hubley, Ken Burns, Victor Fresco and Ken Levin.

In response to Argüelles’ book, Joslin began a second project, The Architecture of the Mountains, a more experimental work that would explore themes related to human consciousness, perception and self-reflexivity. Filming took place at Joslin and Massi's apartment in Florence, Massachusetts, and the Hampshire College campus. The project included time-lapse shots using Tom's 16mm Bolex, an outdoor interview with Argüelles, a western-inspired dream sequence with Hampshire students, and a failed attempt to film inside The Notch, an abandoned nuclear bunker on Bare Mountain. Joslin also designed a device to wake him during the night so he could record his dreams on camera.

Filmmaker Abraham Ravett noted that ‘‘Joslin was frustrated with The Architecture of the Mountains when he took a sabbatical from Hampshire to go to Los Angeles in 1980’’. The film remained unfinished after he was denied a second year of leave. Following his death in 1990, former student Ken Levin stored the original 16mm footage in a rented 40-foot shipping container in Sunland, Los Angeles. In 2009, Ravett obtained Levin’s permission to work with the footage and, together with students Ben Balcom and Sam Shapiro, produced a posthumous cut titled Architecture of Mountains, based on Joslin’s original proposal, Argüelles’ book, and their interpretation of the material.

== 1981–1993: Hollywood and Silverlake Life: The View From Here ==
In 1981, Joslin and Massi moved to Los Angeles to pursue a Hollywood career. Joslin worked as a casting assistant for Francis Ford Coppola's Zoetrope Studios, contributing to productions such as One From The Heart, Frances, and The Outsiders. He later worked on projects such as John Erman's Eleanor, First Lady of the World, Gus Van Sant's Mala Noche, Robert Redford's The Milagro Beanfield War and Victor Fresco and Matthew Fassberg's TV series New Monkees.

During this time, he co-founded the Primary Colors Company with screenwriter Selise E. Eiseman to create independent films and TV series. Their screenplay Most Likely To Succeed was selected as one of eight feature projects at the Sundance Institute's 1985 Script Development Project. From 1986 to 1990, Joslin also taught in the University of Southern California's undergraduate Filmic Writing Program.

=== Silverlake Life: The View From Here ===
After Joslin and Massi were diagnosed with HIV/AIDS, Joslin drafted a proposal for his final project: a six-episode, half-hour television series titled Silverlake Life: The View From Here. Joslin described it as ‘‘the real life saga of a documentary filmmaker whose vision of community, family, and life is crystallized by the personal onslaught of AIDS. Simultaneously looking inward to its filmmaker's heart and outward to the world, this series will be composed of numerous elements–video diaries, recordings of home-life, portraits of Silverlakers and their institutions, music, relevant film clips and thematic essays’’. According to scholar Gabriel Tonelo, these elements would also include ‘‘visual documentation (photos and film) of Silver Lake [...]; the incorporation of his previous autobiographical work (Blackstar: Autobiography of a Close Friend and the unfinished Architecture of Mountains); and clips from different television programs and feature films, such as Blade Runner (Ridley Scott, 1982), Sleeper (Woody Allen, 1973), and Ben Casey (ABC, 1961–1966)’’. Joslin entrusted his Hampshire student, Peter Friedman, with completing the tape in case of a ‘‘health disaster’’.

Joslin used a Super VHS camera to record fragments of their daily lives, including doctor's visits, neighborhood walks, a Christmas family visit to New Hampshire, a spiritual healing session at Miracle Manor in Desert Hot Springs, and extra footage of the 1990 L.A. Marathon. As his symptoms worsened, Massi assumed authorial control of the tape. Film scholar Jim Lane noted that ‘‘this shift in the video narration, from Tom to Mark, signifies the transition from the exhausting aspects of everyday events to the everyday tasks of caring for a dying lover, now that Tom is restricted to his bed’’. After Joslin died on July 1, 1990, Massi continued filming. In his diaries, he expressed his willingness to complete Silverlake Life: "I want to somehow get it down somewhere what it’s like having AIDS. Wonder if I can do it in Tom’s tape. I have thought of changing the tape and making it ‘our’ view. I have a story to tell, too. I’m the widower with AIDS." Massi died on July 11, 1991, before he could witness the finished film.

=== Release and reception ===
In 1991, Peter Friedman inherited forty hours of partially edited footage from Silverlake Life. Over the next fifteen months, he edited this material between Marseilles and New York, using Joslin's notes and existing footage to shape it into a 99-minutes video-diary film. A work-in-progress screened at the 1992 Independent Feature Film Market, and the final cut was completed shortly before its Sundance Film Festival screening, where it won the Freedom of Expression Award and shared the Grand Jury Prize with Children of Fate: Life and Death in a Sicilian Family (Andrew Young and Susan Todd, 1993). The film premiered in Los Angeles at the Vista Theatre on March 19, 1993. Friedman was interviewed about the film by journalist such as Charlie Rose, David Ehrenstein and Terry Gross.

Silverlake Life had its national broadcast debut on PBS' POV on June 15, 1993, for which it won a Peabody Award. According to writer and film editor of 4Columns Melissa Anderson, ‘‘[it] was televised five months into the presidency of Bill Clinton, a putative progressive who nevertheless signed two virulently homophobic policies into law during his first term ("don’t ask, don’t tell" and the Defense of Marriage Act). Adding further to the dissonance—cultural, political, sexual—of the era, six months after the broadcast of Silverlake Life, Jonathan Demme’s Oscar-feted movie Philadelphia was released in theaters, a decorous, desexed AIDS weepie that is the antithesis of Joslin and Friedman's urgent, intimate chronicle".

Silverlake Life also received other major awards, including the Teddy Award at the 1993 Berlin International Film Festival, the Best Biography Award at the San Francisco International Film Festival, the Prix Italia for Best Public TV Documentary Worldwide, and the Los Angeles Film Critics Association Award for Best Independent Film. It was named one of the "10 Best Films of the Year" by The Los Angeles Times, USA Today and The Boston Globe. Film critic Jonathan Rosenbaum described it as "a powerful and rewarding work that fully repays one for the pain of watching it for its impact as a love story, its nobility, and its candor about coping with AIDS in today’s world". Scholar Susanna Egan noted that Silverlake Life achieved "what no conventional autobiography has ever achieved, the making of autobiography beyond the closure of death".

== Death ==
Tom Joslin died of AIDS at his home in Silver Lake on July 1, 1990. A memorial service took place at All Saints Episcopal Church in Highland Park. Mark Massi died of AIDS a year after, on July 11, 1991.

== Legacy ==
The original Silverlake Life videotapes were donated by Peter Friedman to the AIDS Activist Videotape Collection 1985–2000, held at the New York Public Library. The film was released in VHS, LaserDisc and DVD. Friedman added an epilogue to the 2003 DVD edition, depicting Elaine Mayes and Bo Huston’s final visits to the couple's Silver Lake home in 1991.

In 2021, Blackstar was newly restored in 4K by IndieCollect and the Outfest UCLA Legacy Project, after a long period out of distribution.

== Filmography ==
Year	Title	Distributor	Length	Format	Ref.
1966	The Courier	Alchemedia	20’	16mm	
1967	Peter, Paul & Mary Film Project	-	-	16mm	
1968	Out/Moving/In	Alchemedia	15’	16mm	
1970	Various Cycles	Alchemedia	6’	16mm	
1971	Looking for a Better Way	Alchemedia	15’	16mm	
1974	The Golden Razor	Alchemedia	12’	8mm	
1974	Homage to Keaton	Alchemedia	12’	16mm	
1976	Shooting at Work	–	12’	16mm	
1976	Blackstar: Autobiography of a Close Friend	Alchemedia	85’	16mm	
1978/ 2012	The Architecture of the Mountains	Abraham Ravett	62’	16mm	
1993	Silverlake Life: The View From Here	Zeitgeist Films	99’	35mm	
