= Barriss =

Barriss may refer to:

- Tyler Barriss, 911 hoax caller in the 2017 Wichita swatting incident
- Barriss Offee, a fictional character in the Star Wars universe

== See also ==
- Barris
