= Anthem (film) =

1991 short film by Marlon Riggs

- Directed by: Marlon T. Riggs
- Produced by: Marlon T. Riggs
- Cinematography: Christiane Badgley; Thomas Harris; Alex Langford; Marlon Riggs; Calvin Roberts
- Edited by: Christiane Badgley
- Production company: Signifyin' Works
- Release date: 1991
- Running time: 8 minutes
- Country: United States
- Language: English

Anthem is an eight-minute music video released in 1991. The film was produced and directed by Marlon T. Riggs. The film displays mixes images of mainstream African-American pride, such as traditional African tribal dances, alongside images representing gay pride, such as ACT UP's "Silence=Death". The film uses powerful imagery and poetry to explore, celebrate and revolutionize black gay culture.

== Synopsis ==
The film features six black gay artists, five writers reading verses of their poems: Essex Hemphill "American Wedding", Reginald Jackson "Initiation", Steve Langley "Confection", Colin Robinson "Epiphany", "For CJ", "Horizontal Stripes Are In", "To Sir, c Love" and "Unfinished Work" and Donald Woods "What Do I Do About You?"; and Blackberri singing "America the Beautiful". It opens with Robinson repeating: "Parade it proudly like a man; flaunt it like a man."

The Pan-African Flag, with black, red, and green stripes, is flashed across the screen throughout the short film. He continues: "Rearrange syllables, Revolution" as the words are flashed on the screen in white on time with the hip hop music. The call for revolution occurs as images of an African American dancing, the pink hue triangle used to symbolize ACT UP (AIDS Coalition to Unleash Power), and ACT UP's slogan "Silence=Death" are displayed on the screen.

Robinson's voice continues repeatedly with the music: "Pervert the language." Then, as two naked African-American males kiss each other, Woods says: "Every time we kiss" and Robinson "Thrust worn, gritty fingers in my mouth." Then images of roses and a holy cross give way to memorial candles. Robinson's voice says: "Immunity in this holy procession of dying." In response to the memorial candles, the words "Are you scared? Are you safe?" are displayed in white text. Hemphill's voice repeat the statement "In America" as the American Flag is shown in the background. Jackson's voice repeats: "Gender Blender Blur."

The image of the ACT UP triangle is shown again, but this time it has the African continent, with the Pan-African horizontal stripes in it. Jackson's voice says: "Initiate Me". Robinson's badly painted lips voice the words on the screen: "Griots shaping language into power, food and substitute for sex, into tools like weapons of survival, rage and passion, with the clarity of spit. The film concludes as Essex Hemphill reappears reading "American Wedding" in front of a background of an American Flag. as Blackberri sings. As the flag in the background fades, a voice says: "I too sing America."

== Cast ==
- Essex Hemphill – poetry "American Wedding"
- Colin Robinson – poetry "Unfinished Work"
- Reginald T. Jackson – contributing poet
- Steve Langley – contributing poet
- Donald Woods – contributing poet
- The Bella Boys
- Bernard Branner
- Brian Freeman
- Jesse Harris
- David Kirkland
- Willi Ninja
- Tim Riera
- Marlon Riggs

== Analysis and themes ==
By the time Riggs produced Anthem he had been diagnosed with AIDS. (Riggs died in 1994 after fighting AIDS for many years.) The film uses the ACT UP triangle and slogan "Silence=Death". The film seeks solidarity with AIDS victims and draws attention to the pain they are going through. The film shows memorial candles and describes the AIDS epidemic as a "holy procession of dying". The film reaches out to victims by saying: "Are you scared? Are you safe?" Riggs uses a lot of AIDS imagery because he was suffering from AIDS, an issue very real in his life.

Riggs uses a holy cross and red rose for imagery in Anthem. Riggs has been critical of the black church's policy of essentially "Don't ask, Don't tell" toward homosexual men and women.

By placing the African continent inside the ACT UP triangle, Riggs is appealing to Black nationalist movements to include, not exclude, black heterosexuals. Riggs has criticized the Black power movement directly in papers like his essay "Black Macho Revisted". Riggs believes that the Black power movement's call for unification under a macho culture leaves out both queer and feminine culture. Riggs has said that the caricatures the black community has drawn up around black gays and lesbians can be shown to have a direct cultural lineage from caricatures of blacks as Uncle Tom and the Brute Negro. Anthem responds to the Black macho image with the phrases: "Parade it proudly like a man" and "Flaunt it like a man." Riggs is questioning what exactly it means to behave "like a man".

Riggs critiqued the Black Power movement for creating an image of African culture that revolves around the masculine warrior. Riggs wrote that the African Diaspora created a void in the knowledge many blacks have of their heritage. This was filled in by the image of the macho, African warrior. Riggs responds to this view of African culture by displaying images of Africans dancing in traditional garb. Images of the tribal dances are mixed with a gay black man dancing. Thus, Riggs is conveying a message that black gay culture can be a part of African heritage.

The use of drums and hip-hop beats is a tribute to black culture. However, Riggs has critiqued rappers, such as Heavy D, for belittling queer culture. Anthem showcases music that encompasses traditional African rhythm without the Black macho lyrics that are ubiquitous in rap music.

== Release ==
The music video was released in 1991. In June 2021, The Criterion Collection released a seven-film box set, titled The Signifyin' Works of Marlon Riggs, that included the video.

== Reception ==
Benjamin Goff of The Film Stage wrote "Riggs weaves together erotic images of Black men and superimposes them on patriotic images that attempt to appropriately integrate Black queerness through the use of Eisensteinian, constructivist editing techniques." Frameline opined that the "video politicizes the homoeroticism of African American men; with images — sensual, sexual, and defiant — and words intended to provoke, Anthem reasserts the 'self-evident right' to life and liberty in an era of pervasive anti-gay, anti-Black backlash and hysterical cultural repression."

Author Bill Nichols observed that "Rigg's video continues, in a post-Stonewall context, what Word Is Out began; a stirring celebration of gay pride; the video exemplifies the affective, emotion-laden quality of performative documentary." David Gerstner wrote in Queer Pollen that "Riggs recycles the extra footage from Tongues Untied, and pieces together a smart and savvy message about black homophobia and AIDS."

== See also ==
- Marlon Riggs filmography
- List of LGBTQ-related films of 1991
