= Herman Gray =

American sociologist

- Occupation: Professor

Academic background
- Education: University of California, Santa Cruz

Academic work
- Discipline: Sociologist
- Institutions: University of California, Santa Cruz

Herman Gray is emeritus Professor of Sociology at UC Santa Cruz and has published widely in the areas of Black cultural politics and media. Gray's books include: Watching Race: Television And The Struggle For Blackness (University of Minnesota Press, 2004) and Cultural Moves: African Americans and the Politics of Representation (University of California Press, 2005), as well as the collections Towards a Sociology of the Trace (University of Minnesota Press, 2010, co-edited with Macarena Gomez Barriś), and The Sage Handbook of Television Studies (Sage Publishing, 2015, co-edited with M. Alvarado, M. Buonanno and T. Miller). Gray's 2019 book Racism Postrace (Duke University Press) was co-edited with Roopali Mukherjee and Sarah Banet-Weiser. Gray is a member of the Board of Jurors for the Peabody Awards.

== Education ==
Gray attended graduate school at UC Santa Cruz studying under Sociology Professor Hardy T. Frye.

== Appearances ==
Gray appears in Marlon Riggs's 1991 documentary film Color Adjustment.

== Views ==
Gray has stated that nostalgia can be used to induce an uncritical engagement with history, as "a way of not having to confront ... historical realities," in particular as with the "Make America Great Again" slogan.
