= Patricia Turner =

American art historian

Patricia A. Turner
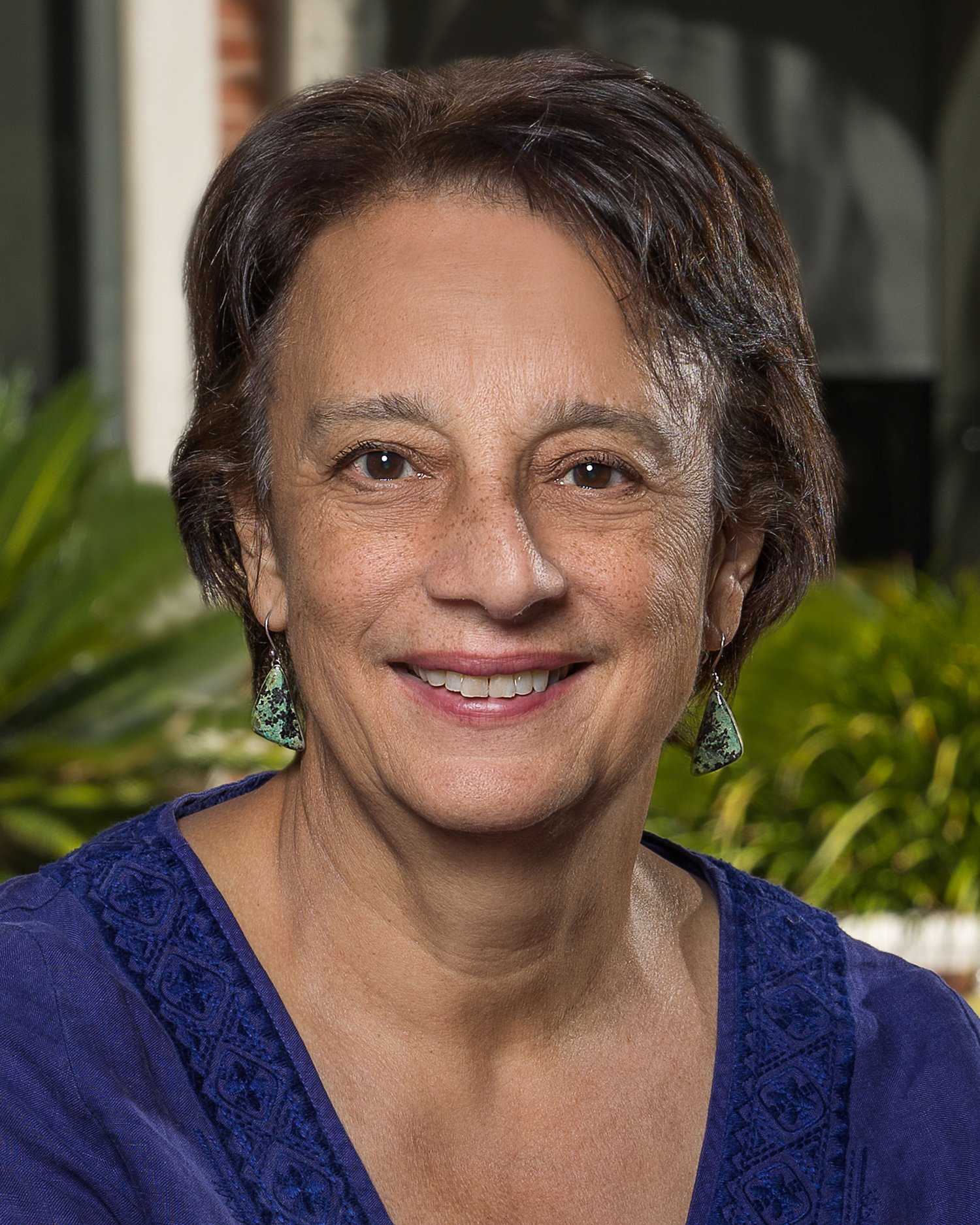
- Writing career
- Genre: Quilt History

Patricia A. Turner is an American Folklorist who documents and analyzes the stories that define the African American experience. A professor in World Arts and Cultures/Dance and African American Studies at UCLA, Turner is the author of five books on topics ranging from rumors, legends and conspiracy theories to African American quilters and images of African Americans in popular culture. She is the 2021 recipient of the Linda Dégh Lifetime Achievement Award.

Turner was vice provost for undergraduate education at UCLA, vice provost of undergraduate studies at UC Davis, and served as the executive director of The Reinvention Center (now The Reinvention Collective), a think tank for senior administrators charged with undergraduate education at research universities. She lives in Los Angeles, California.

== Biography ==
Turner grew up in Sag Harbor, New York. She has a Bachelor of Science from the State University of New York, Oneonta, and a master's degree and doctorate in rhetoric from UC Berkeley.

She began her academic career as an assistant professor at the University of Massachusetts, Boston Black Studies Department, and then transferred to the University of California, Davis, where she moved from assistant professor to professor of the African-American and African studies program and then became interim dean of the division of humanities, Arts & Cultural Studies. From 2006 to 2013, she was the vice provost for undergraduate education at that university. Turner has served as a consulting scholar for several documentaries. She conducted research for and appeared on camera in Marlon Riggs' Ethnic Notions, which won an Emmy Award in 1989 for best research in a documentary.

She also conducted research for and appeared on camera in the 1992 Peabody Award-winning film Color Adjustment. Most recently, she was interviewed for a film on quilt artist Riché Richardson entitled Portrait of the Artist: Riché Richardson.

Turner has been interviewed for stories in the New York Times, Boston Globe, Chicago Tribune, Los Angeles Times, Washington Post, Wall Street Journal, Newsweek, and many other prominent publications. She has been interviewed on the radio for features on such programs as Fresh Air, Talk of the Nation, and All Things Considered. She has appeared on the NBC Nightly News, the CBS Evening News, and The O'Reilly Factor. In addition, her book I Heard It Through the Grapevine inspired a story on ABC's 20/20.

== Quilt history ==
Turner was greatly influenced in 1986 when she saw photographs of Alabama Black Belt quilters taken by Roland L. Freeman, shown in that year's catalog for the Festival of American Folklife in Washington, D.C. There, as a young folklorist, Turner spent two weeks with Alabama quilters who participated in the festival and with Gladys-Marie Fry, who facilitated public workshops with the quilters. Turner uses quilts to examine African American culture.

Turner wrote Crafted Lives, an in-depth profile of nine African American quilters (young to old, male and female) from Alaska to the Southern states. In the book, she also deconstructed issues surrounding Underground Railroad quilts using folklorist tools and explored who determines the economic and artistic value of quilts, such as the quilts of Gee's Bend.

She curated "From Functional to Fancy: An Eastville Quilt Sampler" (2009) at the Eastville Community Historical Society in Sag Harbor, New York. On display were quilts by Riche Richardson, Ph.D., Marion Coleman, Dolores Vitero Presley, and the Alabama Freedom Quilting Bee.

Turner is a quilter herself and frequently lectures on quilt culture.

== Legend and rumor research ==
In addition to quilt history, Turner has written several books and articles on the subject of race-related contemporary legends and rumors. Her 1993 book I Heard It Through the Grapevine explored legends and rumors that proliferate within the African-American community, often as a response to real racist hostilities from the dominant culture.

In 2004, Turner co-authored Whispers on the Color Line with sociologist Gary Alan Fine. Within this work, Turner and Fine analyzed how legends Black and White Americans tell about one another reflect racial tensions within American society.

Turner's 2022 book Trash Talk analyzed rumors and conspiracy theories about former United States President Barack Obama and his family. Turner argues that understanding anti-Obama lore, such as the birther movement, is integral to understanding the wave of American right-wing populist politicians like Donald Trump that followed his presidency.

== Books ==
- Trash Talk: Anti-Obama Lore and Race in the 21st Century (2022)
- Crafted Lives: Stories and Studies of African American Quilters by Patricia A. Turner (2009)
- Whispers on the Color Line: Rumor and Race in America, by Gary Alan Fine and Patricia A. Turner (2004)
- Ceramic Uncles and Celluloid Mammies: Black Images and Their Influence on Culture, by Patricia A. Turner (2002)
- I Heard It Through the Grapevine: Rumor in African-American Culture, by Patricia A. Turner (1994)

== Articles ==
- From Lafayette to Barack Obama: Past and Future In a Quilt Exhibit
- The Rise and Fall of Eliza Harris: From Novel to Tom Shows to Quilts
