= Magnes Collection of Jewish Art and Life =

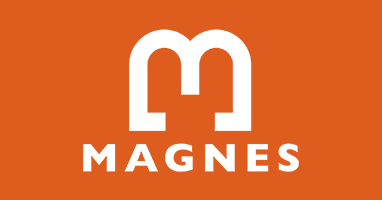
- Former name: Judah L. Magnes Museum
- Established: 1962
- Location: 2121 Allston Way; Berkeley, CA 94720 (United States)
- Coordinates: 37.8592°N 122.248°W
- Type: Art museum, Jewish Heritage Museum
- Collection size: 45,000
- Director: Hannah E. Weisman
- Curator: Francesco Spagnolo
- Website: http://magnes.berkeley.edu/

The Magnes Collection of Jewish Art and Life (formerly the Judah L. Magnes Museum) is an extensive collection of Jewish history, art, and culture at the University of California, Berkeley. The Magnes Collection comprises more than 45,000 Jewish artworks, artifacts, photographs, and manuscripts, the third largest collection of its kind in the United States. The holdings of The Magnes Collection are catalogued into three distinct areas, which together constitute the single collection: the Archives, the Library, and the Museum.

== Museum ==
The Museum holdings of The Magnes encompass two main areas: Jewish Art and Jewish Life. The Jewish Art collection includes painting and sculpture, photography, works on paper and artist books, as well as digital and mixed media. The Jewish Life collection includes thousands of objects representing personal and family rituals, synagogue and communal life, and the social interactions among Jewish and host communities in the Global Jewish Diaspora throughout history.

== Archives ==
The archival holdings have been a central feature of the collecting interests of the Magnes since its inception. The intention is to provide a wide-ranging approach to the Jewish experience in its many manifestations. The archival collections complement museum and library holdings and include manuscripts, photographs, personal papers, and institutional and professional records according to two collecting areas: The Global Jewish Diaspora collections and The Western Jewish Americana collections.

== Library ==
The library holdings of The Magnes include rare and illustrated books from the global Jewish diaspora, periodicals, reference and original materials about Jewish history in the American West, as well as sound recordings, music books and manuscripts.

== Locations ==
The Magnes Collection's museum, with exhibition and event spaces, is located at 2121 Allston Way in downtown Berkeley; the building, previously a printing plant, was given a "utilitarian but sparkling" renovation by Pfau Long Architects of San Francisco, with a "sleek and transparent" interior including custom case work by Pacassa Studios of Oakland.

The Magnes Collection archives are held at the Bancroft Library at UC Berkeley.

== History ==
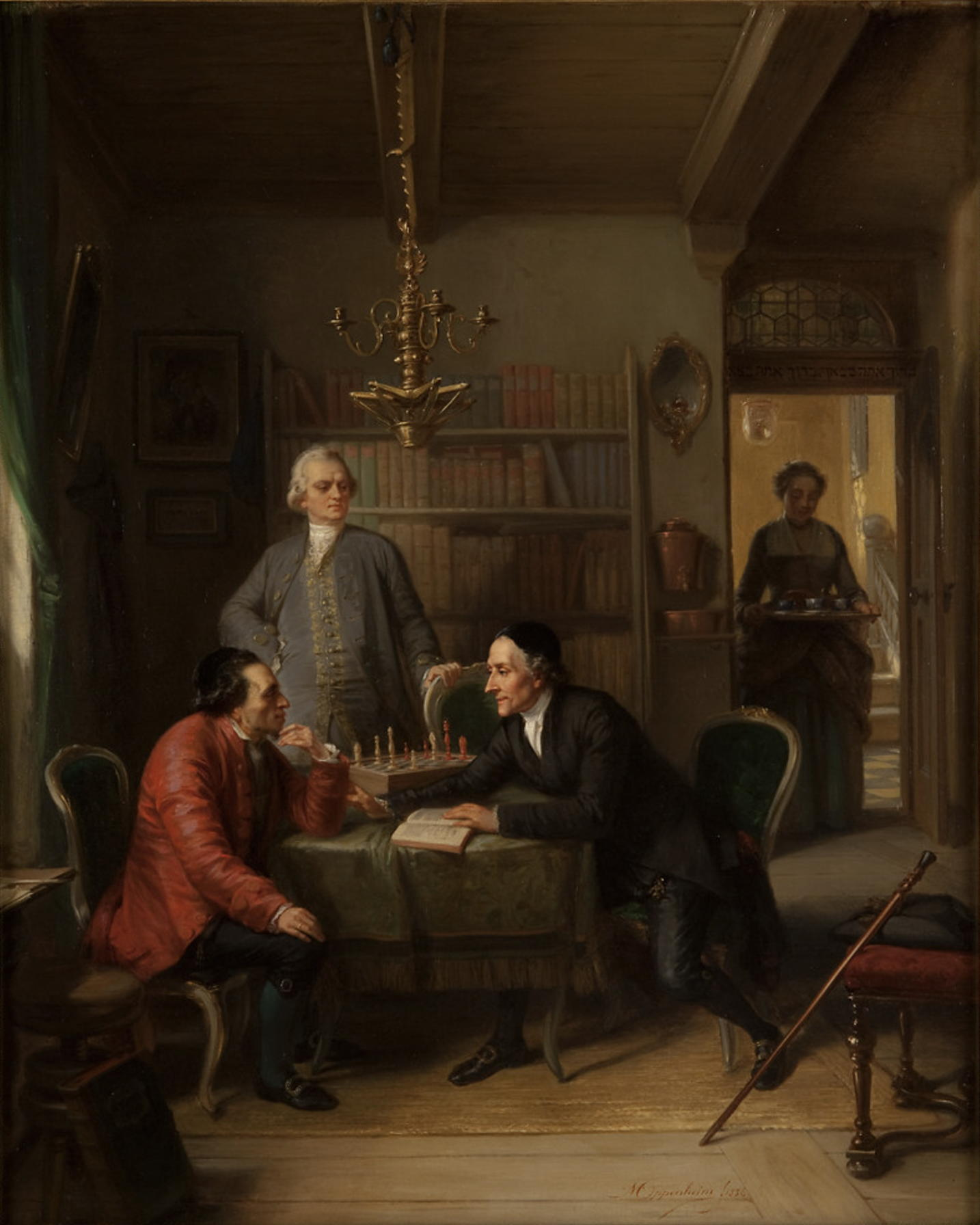
Lavater and Lessing Visit Moses Mendelssohn (1856) by Moritz Daniel Oppenheim, "one of the most prized holdings" in the Magnes Collection.

The museum was founded in 1962 by Seymour Fromer and Rebecca Camhi Fromer, and named for Jewish activist Rabbi Judah L. Magnes (1877–1948), a native of Oakland, California and co-founder of the Hebrew University of Jerusalem. Beginning as one room above the Parkway Movie Theater off Lake Merritt in downtown Oakland, the museum eventually expanded and relocated to the former Burke Mansion (by architect Daniel J. Patterson) at 2911 Russell Street in Berkeley. Artist Beatrice Winn Berlin taught printmaking classes in the 1970s.

The Fromers' collecting activities ranged from salvaging Yiddish LP records from dumpsters and collecting libraries of Yiddish books from Jewish chicken farmers in Petaluma, California, to retrieving Judaica poised to be discarded as Jewish life in various regions was diminishing, among them Morocco, Tunisia, Egypt, Czechoslovakia, India, and Central Europe.

During the 2000s, negotiations were held to merge the Judah L. Magnes Museum with the Contemporary Jewish Museum of San Francisco, but failed to produce an agreement to combine the two institutions.

In 2010, the Judah L. Magnes Museum donated its collection to the University of California, Berkeley, which agreed to display and preserve the museum's artifacts, and to collect new acquisitions. As part of the agreement, the collection was moved from the 8,600-square-foot house on Russell Street in Berkeley to a 25,000-square-foot building on Allston Way in downtown Berkeley. The Magnes Museum's board of directors had purchased the Allston Way building in 1997.

The museum reopened in its new facility on January 22, 2012. Its name was changed from the Judah L. Magnes Museum to the Magnes Collection of Jewish Art and Life.

== Exhibitions ==
Since its founding in 1962, the Magnes has presented exhibitions that break new ground in Jewish Studies research, build upon the collaboration between curators and UC Berkeley faculty and students, expand Judaica connoisseurship, introduce under-recognized Jewish artists of the 20th century, and take risks with experimental projects by contemporary artists. Many exhibitions draw on the extensive collections, or introduce commissioned works that use the collections as inspiration.

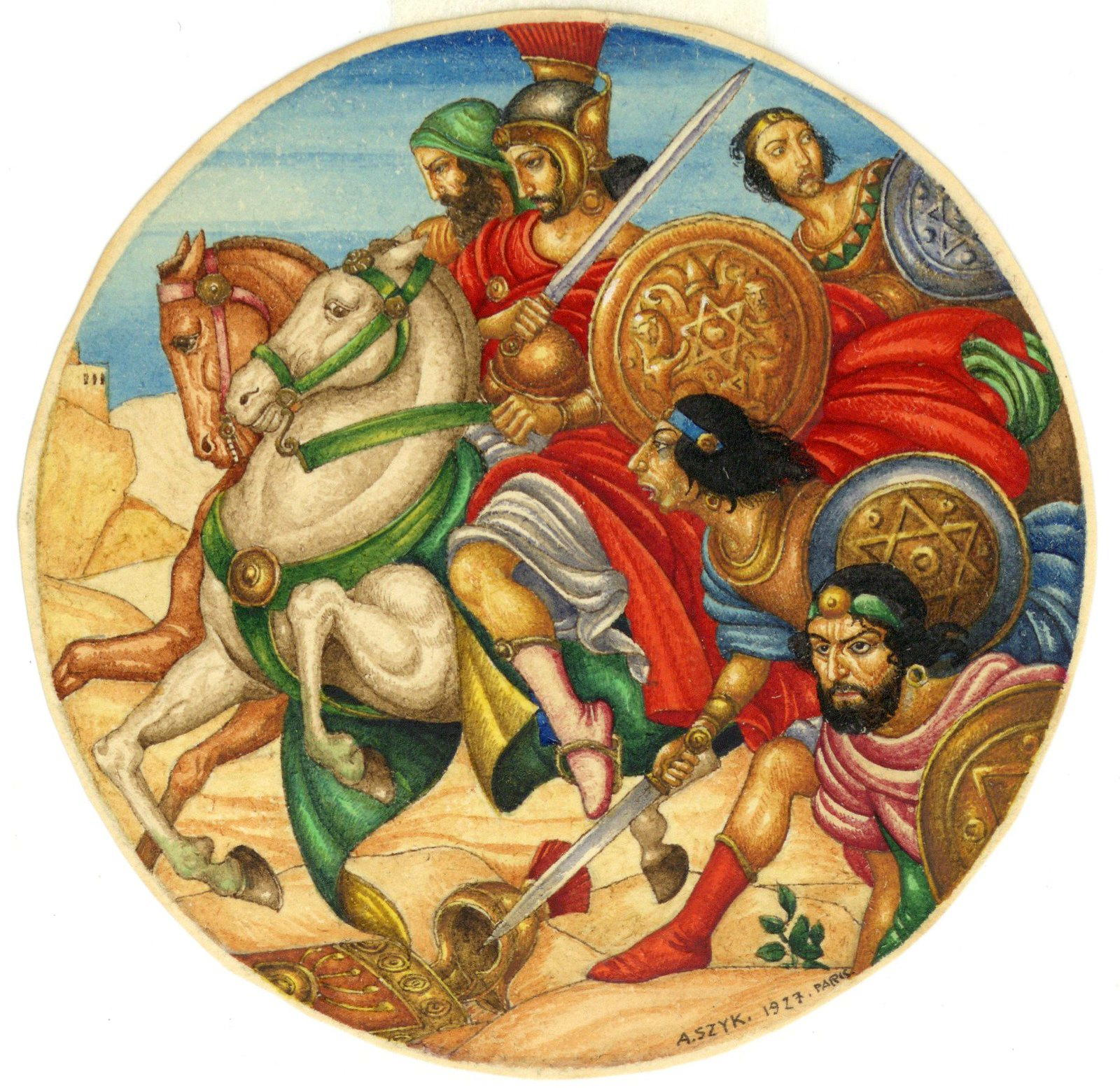
Arthur Szyk, Bar Kochba (1927), displayed in the exhibition Pièces de Résistance: Echoes of Judaea Capta From Ancient Coins to Modern Art, 2018.

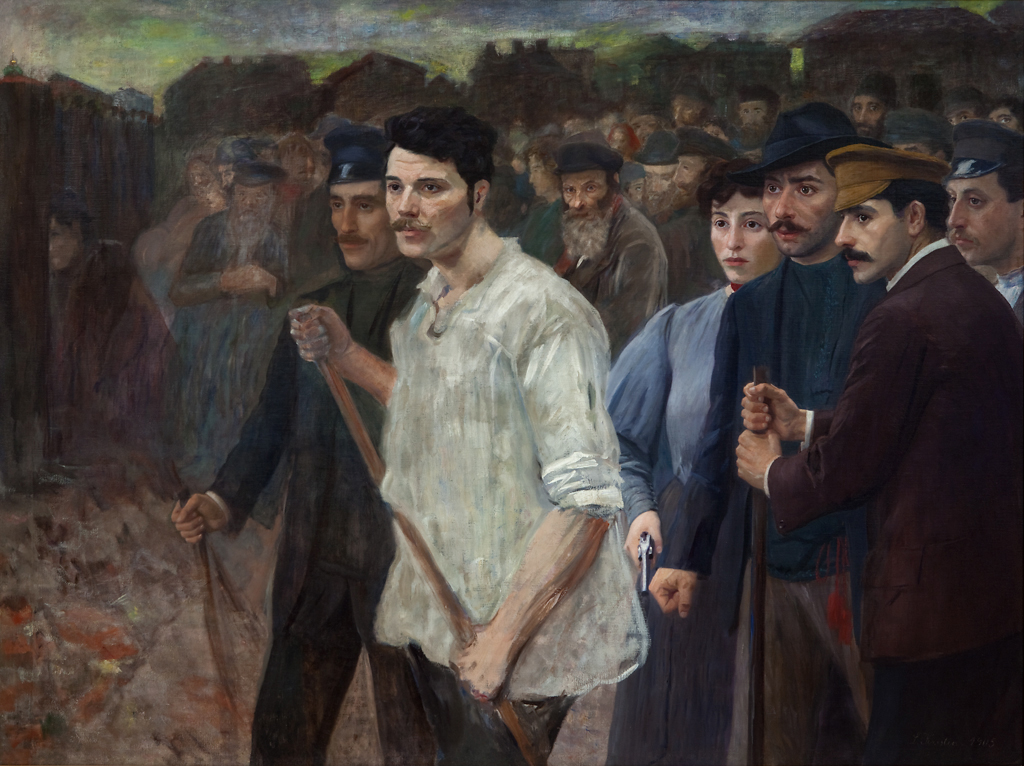
Lazar Krestin, [Birth of] Jewish Resistance (1905), displayed in the exhibition Pièces de Résistance: Echoes of Judaea Capta From Ancient Coins to Modern Art, 2018.

Since re-opening in 2012, the Magnes has acquired two major collections which have resulted in multiple exhibitions: 450 artworks by Arthur Szyk, a Polish Jewish artist and political caricaturist whose subjects span some of the most profound events of the 20th century, acquired in 2017, and in 2018, the archives of photographer Roman Vishniac, comprising over 30,000 images, audiovisual materials, correspondence, and memorabilia, a gift from his daughter, Mara Vishniac Kohn, which marked the largest donation the Magnes has yet received (tripling the number of items in its collection) and the third most valuable gifted collection ever received by the University of California, Berkeley.

Notable exhibitions include:

- In Plain Sight: Jewish Arts and Lives in the Muslim World, 2024
- Cities and Wars: Roman Vishniac in Berlin and Jerusalem 1947/1967, 2023
- In Real Times: Arthur Szyk, Art & Human Rights (1926-1951), 2022
- Souvenirs from Utopia: The Bezalel School of Arts and Crafts in Jerusalem (1906-1932), 2020
- Memory Objects: Judaica Collections and Global Migrations, 2019
- Project "Holy Land": Yaakov Benor-Kalter's Photographs of British Mandate Palestine, 1923-1940, 2018
- The Worlds of Arthur Szyk | The Taube Family Arthur Szyk Collection, 2018
- Pièces de Résistance: Echoes of Judaea Capta From Ancient Coins to Modern Art, 2018
- Sketching Fiddler: Set Designs by Mentor Huebner, 2017
- From the Photographer’s Archive: Roman Vishniac, 2017
- By Design: American Jewish Education in The World Over Cover Art (1946-1957), 2016
- I-Tal-Yah: An Island of Divine Dew. Italian Crossroads in Jewish Culture, 2016
- From Mendelssohn To Mendelssohn: German Jewish Encounters in Art, Music, and Material Culture, 2016
- The Future of Memory: Jewish Culture in the Digital Age, 2015
- The Secret Language of Flowers: Botanical Drawings from Israel, 1949-1950, 2015
- Literary Minds: Soviet Jewish Writers portrayed by Matvei Vaisberg, 2014
- Saved by The Bay: The Intellectual Migration from Fascist Europe to UC Berkeley, 2014
- Holy Land, California: Prints by Albert Garvey, 1974, 2013
- Mayer Kirshenblatt, They Called Me Mayer July: Painted Memories of a Jewish Childhood before the Holocaust, 2007
- Jonathon Keats, The First Intergalactic Art Exposition, 2006-2007
- Lazar Khidekel: Surviving Suprematism, 2004–2005
- Alfred Henry Jacobs, 2003-2004
- Souvenirs from Israel, 1948-1998, 1998
- The Legacy of Boris Deutsch: A Centennial Exhibition, 1992
- Elizabeth Fleischmann: Pioneer X-Ray Photographer, 1990
- Ben-Zion: A Tradition of Independence, 1986
- Beth Ames Swartz, Israel Revisited, 1982–1983
- The Decorative World of Ori Sherman, 1980; In Twilight: Ori Sherman's Creation, 2022
- Paper-Cuts by Yehudit Shadur, 1978
- Baruch Nachshon, The Torah Is Deeper than the Ocean, 1972
- Jacques Schnier, Transparencies and Reflections, 1971.
- Aaron Goodelman retrospective, 1965.

== See also ==
- Judah Leon Magnes
- Taube Foundation for Jewish Life & Culture
- Western Jewish History Center at the Bancroft Library at UC Berkeley
- Contemporary Jewish Museum of San Francisco
