= Matvei Vaisberg =

- Born: 28 December 1958 (age 67); Kyiv, Ukraine
- Education: Ivan Fiodorov Ukrainian Printing Institute (Nowadays Ukrainian Academy of Printing)
- Known for: Painting, Book design
- Style: influenced by Georges Rouault, Chaïm Soutine
- Website: Personal website

Matvei Vaisberg (Ukrainian: Матві́й Семе́нович Ва́йсберг; born 28 December 1958) is a Ukrainian painter, graphic artist and book designer.

== Biography ==
Matvei Vaisberg is the only son of Semion Vaisberg, a chess trainer, and Shelly Harzman, an art historian; a grandson of the poet Matvey Harzman (Motl Harzman) on his mother’s side and Berta J. Vaisberg, a seven-time Ukraine Champion in chess, on his father’s.

In 1985, he graduated from Ivan Fiodorov Ukrainian Printing Institute (nowadays Ukrainian Academy of Printing). In 1988, he started to take part in collective exhibitions. In 1990, his first personal exhibition took place in the Historical Museum of Podol (Kyiv). More than fifty of both collective and his personal exhibitions have taken place by now, including those in the National Art Museum (Kyiv), Kyiv National Museum of Russian Art (Kyiv), Museum of Contemporary Art in Odesa (Odesa), Cherkasy Museum of Fine Arts (Cherkasy), Berlin Wall Museum (Berlin), Ukrainian Institute of America (New York), Europe House (London), the Sejm of the Republic of Poland (Warsaw), Georgian National museum Georgia.

== Creative work ==
Vaisberg deeply appreciates the creative work of many artists, especially that of Georges Rouault, Chaïm Soutine and Francisco Goya. Together with Andrij Mokrousov, an art and literary critic, he developed the conception of art arrière-garde many years ago and represents it in his art. Along with being a stranger to the mimetic, he cannot be considered to be close to abstract art at the same time. Without reckoning himself as a religious artist or a religious human, he nevertheless remains a faithful adherent of biblical themes (Days of Creation, Book of Job, Scenes from TaNaK). In 2014, the artist turned his attention to the event, taking place in Kyiv during 2013-2014, and painted “Wall” cycle. From 1 March to 9 May 2022, he created the series "Travel Diary", which he painted in three countries – Poland, the Czech Republic, and Germany, while his forced exile due to the war unleashed by Putin's Russia against Ukraine. The series was presented at an exhibition at the Dukat Gallery in Kyiv in July 2022, and in October 2022 it was exhibited at the Ministry of Justice of the Kingdom of the Netherlands. The Folio publishing house publishes this graphic series in a book of Serhiy Zhadan's poems.

In May 2023, together with curators Roza Tapanova and Oleh Sosnov, and artists Vitaliy Kravets and Volodymyr Yakukhno, he made three monumental panels in the Babyn Yar Historical and Memorial Reserve.

=== Painting cycles ===
Matvei Vaisberg is the author of “Seven Days” (1998–1999), “Judaean Desert” (2001), “Anthropic Principle” (2004–2008), “Dancings” (2006–2009), “Scenes from TaNaK” (2006), “Holy Heaven Remains Silent” (2008), “Pur Vital” (2006), “Threetwotwo” (2009), “Wall” (based on the prints for the Old Testament by Hans Holbein the Younger, 2012), and others. In 2014, it was one more time when the artist painted a cycle, named “Wall”. The cycle was done from 28 January 2014 to 8 March 2014. It was dedicated to the event on Maidan Nezalezhnosti (Independence Square) in Kyiv in 2013–2014. The author himself was a witness of the developments and an active participant in the historical event. The cycle consists of 28 pictures, each measuring 45 cm by 60 cm, which are exhibited as a single block, looking like a wall. The cycle was shown in Kyiv, London, Berlin, New York, Los Angeles, Warsaw (the Sejm of the Republic of Poland, 5 March 2015) and other cities in Poland. The artist is going to present the cycle to the public in Italy, USA and Ukraine.

=== Book design ===
Vaisberg is an illustrator of the books by Sholem Aleichem, Eduard Bagritsky, Isaac Babel, Grigorijus Kanovičius, José Ortega y Gasset, Carl Jung, Søren Kierkegaard, Fyodor Dostoyevsky and Joseph Roth.

== Works of art in museums and galleries ==
Painting and graphic works by Matvei Vaisberg are in museums and galleries in Kyiv, Vilnius, Chicago, Berlin and other cities as well as in private collections in different countries of the world. In 2014, the Magnes Museum (Berkeley, California, USA) bought 12 pictures by Vaisberg for its collection of Jewish art and life. Four of them are portraits of the famous Yiddish-language Jewish poets, executed by Soviet NKVD in 1952 (Jewish Anti-Fascist Committee case, Night of the Murdered Poets), Itzik Feffer (1900-1952), Leib Kvitko (1890-1952), Peretz Markish (1895-1952), David Hofstein (1889-1952); four – of the famous writers and poets Sholem Aleichem, Osip Mandelstam, Boris Pasternak and David Bergelson.
