= Peter Friedman (documentary filmmaker) =

American documentary filmmaker

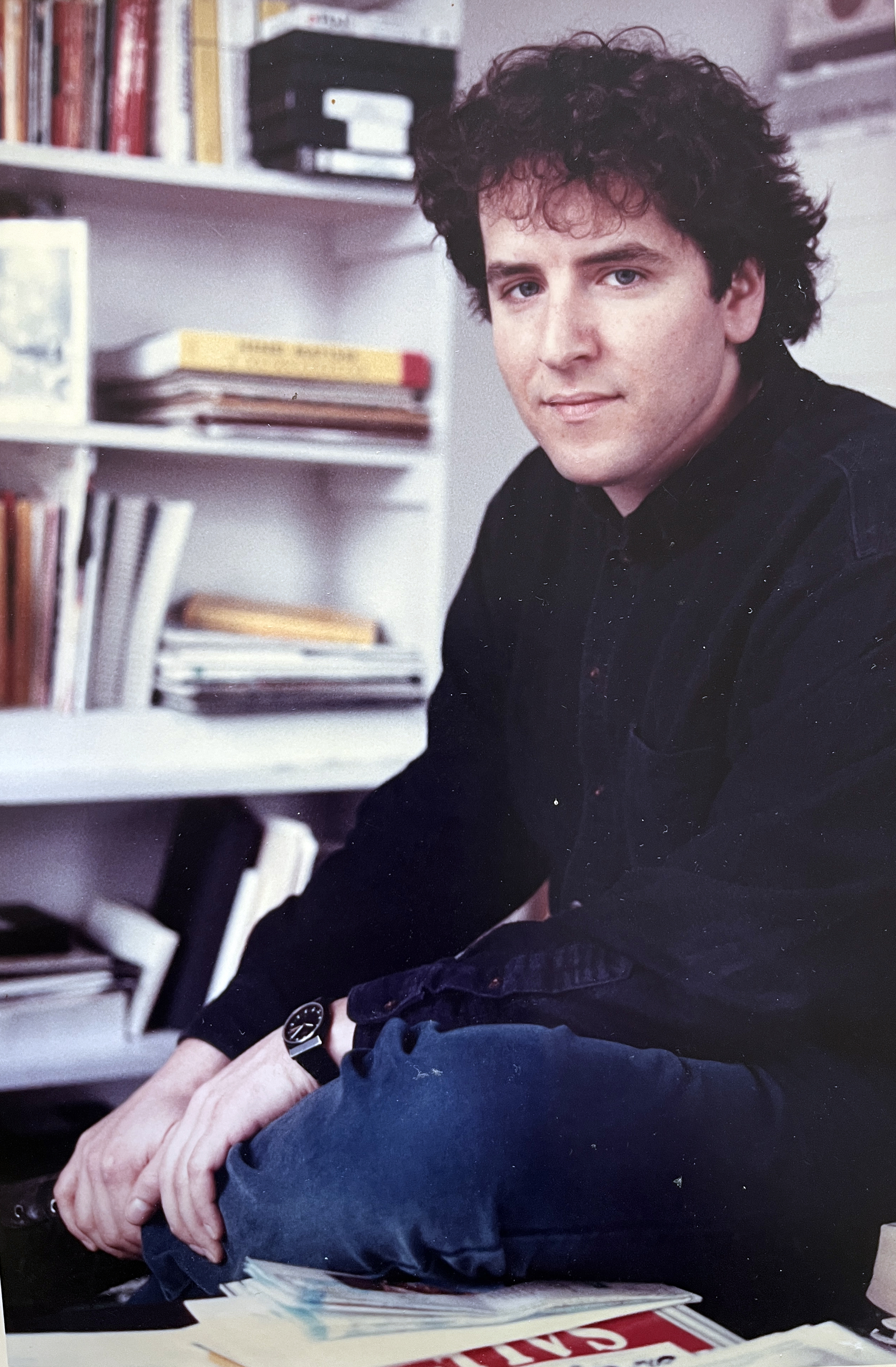
Peter Friedman. ca.1979

Peter Friedman (November 28, 1958 - April 3, 2025) was an American documentary filmmaker, best known for Silverlake Life: The View From Here, a video-diary about living and dying with AIDS.

== Early life and education ==
Peter was born on 28 November 1958 in New Jersey. He attended Hampshire College from 1976 to 1982, where he met his first mentor, Tom Joslin. Joslin’s coming-out film, Blackstar: Autobiography of a Close Friend, made a lasting impression on Friedman, helping him come out and inspiring him to pursue a career in filmmaking. During a visiting year at NYU Film School, he met his second mentor, George Stoney, and received a Louis B. Mayer Fellowship. His thesis film, The Wizard of the Strings, a portrait of vaudeville performer Roy Smeck, was nominated for an Academy Award for Best Documentary (Short Subject) in 1986.

Peter briefly enrolled in the MFA program at Columbia University under Frank Daniel, but turned down a second-year scholarship to work as an assistant editor on Before Stonewall, a documentary on LGTBQ+ history for PBS, which later received two Emmys. He also contributed to Halloweenie, a documentary in which activist Bob Lyss "dresses up as a six-foot penis for the Greenwich Village Halloween Parade."

== Career ==
From 1982 to 1990, Friedman worked as a freelance documentary editor for PBS, HBO and National Geographic. In 1991, he directed Fighting in Southwest Louisiana, a documentary about an HIV-positive mailman (Danny Cooper) living in rural Louisiana. The film would later be featured in the Guggenheim Museum’s program “Fever In the Archives: AIDS Activist Video”.

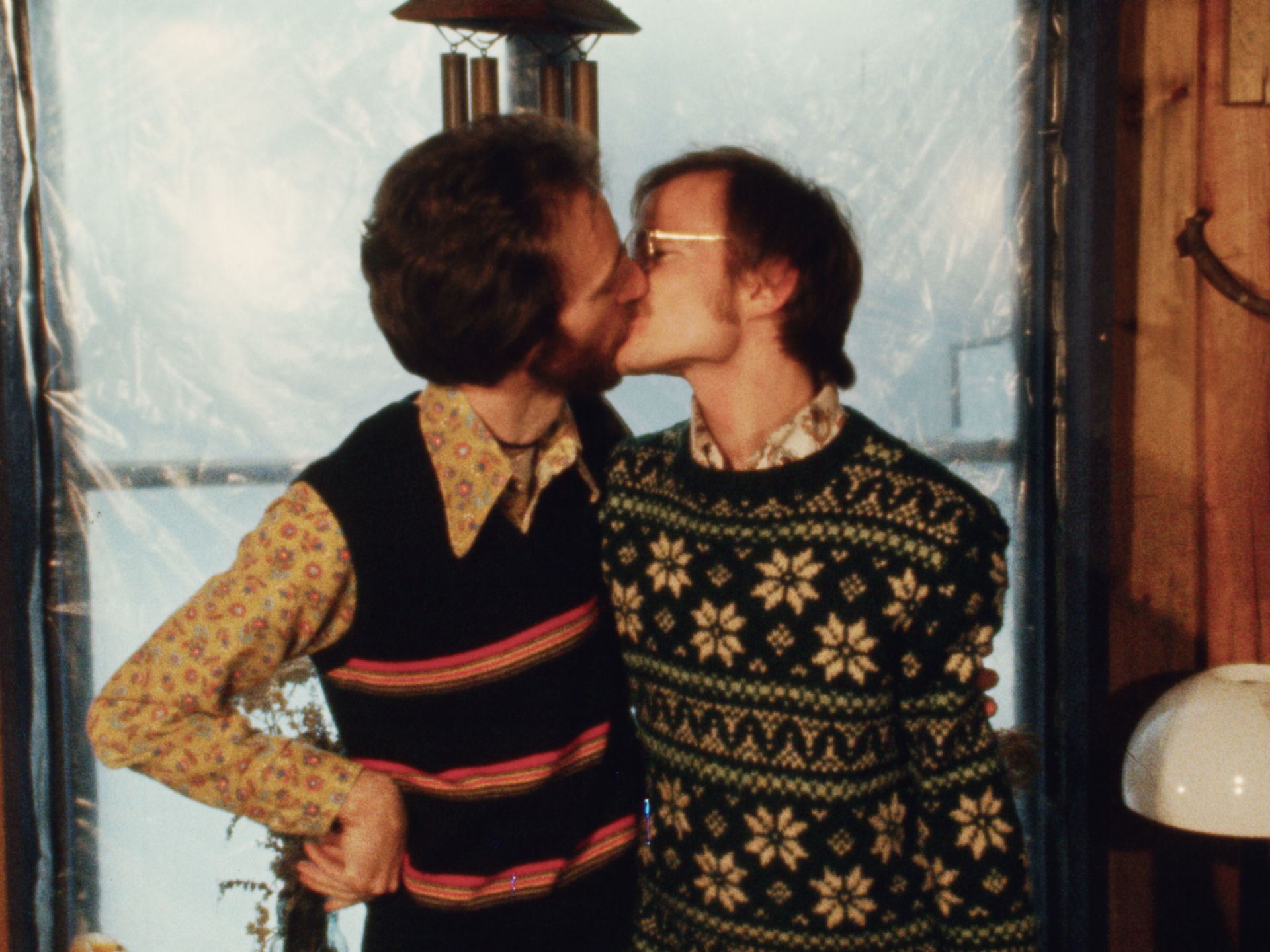
Silverlake Life: The View From Here (Tom Joslin, Peter Friedman, 1993)

His most prominent film, Silverlake Life: The View From Here, was completed in 1993. The documentary was based on the daily experiences of filmmaker Tom Joslin and his partner Mark Massi, following their diagnoses with HIV/AIDS, and was primarily composed of home video footage they recorded during their final year together. After Joslin's death, Friedman was given the task of sorting through the 40 hours of tapes and editing them to a documentary. The editing took fifteen months, with the final cut completed shortly before its premiere at the 1993 Sundance Film Festival, where it won the Grand Jury Prize and the Freedom of Expression Award. The film also received the Teddy Award, the International Documentary Association Award (IDA) and the Peabody Award, and was broadcast on PBS's POV series. Film critic Jonathan Rosenbaum included Silverlake Life on his top-ten list of 1993, calling the film a ‘‘powerful and rewarding work that fully repays one for the pain of watching it for its impact as a love story, its nobility, and its candor about coping with AIDS in today’s world’’.

== Later Work ==
Friedman's later work explored a broader range of subjects, often blending science and cultural themes. In 1995, he collaborated with neurobiologist Jean-François Brunet, his husband, on Death by Design, a documentary on cell biology that received critical acclaim and won the Prix Europa in 1996. His subsequent films include There Are No Direct Flights from New York to Marseille (1998), which explored cultural displacement and LGBTQ+ identity; Mana – Beyond Belief (co-directed with Roger Manley, 2004), an essay on the symbolic power of objects, Poor Consuelo Conquers the World (2011), a documentary on soap operas, and The Devil Is in the Details (2022), a cinéma vérité portrait of stage director Robert Carsen.

== Death ==
In 2025, Peter was diagnosed with colon cancer. He died in palliative care in Paris on April 3, 2025, at the age of 66.

== Filmography ==
- The Wizard Of Strings (1986)
- Fighting in Southwest Louisiana: Gay Life in Rural America (1991)
- I Talk To Animals (1991)
- Silverlake Life: The View From Here (1993, co-directed with Tom Joslin)
- Death by Design (1995)
- The Life & Times of The Life & Times: The Biology of Aging (1998)
- There Are No Direct Flights Between New York and Marseille (1998)
- The Big Picture (2002)
- Silverlake Life: Epilogue (2003, co-directed with Elaine Mayes)
- Mana: Beyond Belief (2004)
- Poor Consuelo Conquers The World (2011)
- In the Name of Christ: Scott Lively, the Tip of the Iceberg (2014)
- Remember to Come Back (2020)
- The Devil Is In The Details (2022)
