= Black Is... Black Ain't =

1995 American documentary film by Marlon Riggs

Black is... Black Ain't
- Directed by: Marlon Riggs
- Starring: Cornel West bell hooks Angela Davis; Essex Hemphill; Bill T. Jones; Marlon Riggs
- Release date: 1995
- Running time: 87 mins.
- Country: United States
- Language: English

Black Is... Black Ain't is a 1995 award-winning feature-length documentary by Marlon Riggs. It explores the multiplicity of expressions of African-American identity.

== Overview ==
Black Is... Black Ain't is an exploration and comprehensive commentary of the Black experience in America. Riggs establishes that there is no singular definition of what it means "to be Black". The very form and content illustrate Blackness in its multiplicities. The film presents a plethora of black identities disallowing for generalization or stereotyping of the larger Black community. Riggs explores a diverse range of topics including the history, and rise of African American, patriarchal structure and its effects on the perception of Black families, men and women today.

Riggs uses his grandmother's gumbo as a metaphor for the rich diversity of Black identities. The metaphor takes a traditional, archetypal black symbol and changes the interpretation. Gumbo is made of anything and everything, and as the camera moves close to the pot, the viewer can sense that the dish is made of different, clashing ingredients. The gumbo alludes to the diverse black community, symbolizing unity, communion, and inclusiveness. The film traverses the country interviewing African Americans young and old, rich and poor, Northern and Southern, rural and urban, gay and straight, as they discuss the numerous, often contested definitions of Blackness. Riggs mixes performances by choreographer Bill T. Jones and poet Essex Hemphill with commentary by noted activist Angela Y. Davis, and cultural critics bell hooks, Cornel West, Michele Wallace, Barbara Smith and Maulana Karenga to create a flavorful stew of personal testimony, music, and history.

While Black Is... Black Ain't looks at Black diversity, many speakers express the pain of having been silenced or excluded because they were perceived as "not Black enough" or conversely "too Black". Black Is... Black Ain't also provides a critique of sexism, patriarchy, homophobia, colorism and cultural nationalism in the family, church and other Black institutions. The film also discusses black ancestry, various origins of black people, and ultimately the displacement of black people. Riggs shows a wide array of people within the Black Diaspora. By doing so, he exhibits how diverse blackness is, contradicting societies homogenization of black people. Riggs demonstrates the many ways in which blackness can manifest and validates the intersectional identities black people hold that are systemically erased. The LGBTQ community is often left out of discourses about blackness, but Riggs makes it a point to include them as a central through-line of his narrative. His documentary style videography using talking heads literally works to bring LGBTQ people to the forefront in the film to represent themselves rather than excluding or alienating them as a subgroup of the black community. Overall, the film touches on various topics relating to the black community, but the overarching theme is that across the concept of blackness— in all its versatility and multiplicity— solidarity in that identity collectively outweighs the differences within the community.

== Style ==
The form of this documentary is different from the traditional documentary in the sense that the director inserts himself into the film. Riggs, himself is a participant in the film. He is shown, in a race against time to finish the film, struggling with his precarious health and mortality. There are interviews with him while he is in the hospital, and even the opening scene of the film is a shot of himself in the woods. Riggs died of AIDS in April 1994 at the age of 37 before the film was completed. Adhering to Riggs’ notes, his colleagues on the production team, Producer Nicole Atkinson and Co-director/Editor Christiane Badgley, completed the film with Signifyin' Works, the non-profit production company that Marlon created in 1991 to produce his work.

== Reception ==
Black Is... Black Ain't won the Filmmakers’ Trophy at the 1995 Sundance Film Festival and the Distinguished Achievement Award from the International Documentary Association.
