= Rebecca Fromer =

American playwright, historian and poet

- Born: January 16, 1927; New York City, New York
- Died: January 1, 2012 (aged 84); San Francisco, California
- Occupations: playwright, historian, and poet
- Organization: Judah L. Magnes Museum
- Spouse: Seymour Fromer
- Children: Mira Z. Amiras

Rebecca Camhi Fromer (January 16, 1927 – January 1, 2012) was an American playwright, historian and poet. Fromer co-founded the Judah L. Magnes Museum of Berkeley, California, in 1961 with her husband, Seymour Fromer. The museum, which is now called the Magnes Collection of Jewish Art and Life and became part of the University of California, Berkeley in 2010, houses more than 15,000 Judaica artifacts and manuscripts, the third largest collection of its kind in the United States.

Fromer was born in New York City and raised in Los Angeles. She moved to Oakland, California, with her husband in 1953.

Fromer authored and co-authored several historical books and articles on Jewish history. Her books authored included Sonderkommando, Bridge of Sorrow, Bridge of Hope, The Holocaust Odyssey of Daniel Bennahmias, The House by the Sea: A Portrait of the Holocaust in Greece and Rumkowski and the Orphans of Lodz. Fromer was familiar with Sephardic culture and could speak the Ladino language.

Fromer, a resident of Berkeley, died on January 1, 2012, in San Francisco at age 84. Her husband, Seymour Fromer, who co-founded the museum with her, died in 2009. They had one daughter, Mira Z. Amiras.
