= Death by Design: The Life and Times of Life and Times =

Death by Design
- Directed by: Peter Friedman; Jean-François Brunet
- Release date: 1995

Death by Design is a 1995 science documentary directed by Peter Friedman and Jean-François Brunet of the Ecole Normale Supérieure in Paris which focuses on cell biology, with an emphasis on programmed cell death and why our lives depend on it.

== Cast ==
Featured are prominent biologists such as Nobel prize laureate Rita Levi-Montalcini (along with her artist twin sister Paola Levi-Montalcini), Martin Raff, Polly Matzinger, Pierre Golstein, and Nobel laureate Robert Horvitz.

== Notable elements ==
The documentary is notable for its combination of a whimsical use of metaphors with scientific rigor, and incorporates animation, micro-cinematography, and scenes from old Hollywood films and stock footage, including Busby Berkeley-choreographed dance routines. The opening scene features the trailer from the 1950s science fiction film It Came From Outer Space. (Note: "The Life and Times of Life and Times" is a separate film that is included on the same DVD).

== Awards ==
Winner of: The Prix Euopa in Berlin for Best Non-Fiction Film of the Year, The Earthwatch Environmental Film Award, The Audience Award, Marseille International Documentary Film Festival, France The Jury Prize, Visions du Réel International Documentary Films, Nyon, Switzerland, The Golden Gate Award, 1996 San Francisco International Film Festival, The Jury Prize, Thomas Edison Film Festival, New Jersey, 1996, The Gold Apple, National Educational Media Network Awards, California, 1996, The Grand Jury Prize, Festival du Film de Chercheur, France, 1996, The Bell-Northern Prize for Scientific Excellence and the Pratt & Whitney Prize for Excellence in Science Popularization at the Québec Science Film Festival.
