= Ethnic Notions =

1987 American documentary film

- Directed by: Marlon Riggs
- Produced by: Marlon Riggs
- Narrated by: Esther Rolle
- Distributed by: California Newsreel
- Release date: 1987
- Running time: 56 minutes
- Country: United States
- Language: English

Ethnic Notions is a 1987 video essay documentary film directed by Marlon Riggs. It examines anti-Black stereotypes in popular culture from the ante-bellum period until the advent of the Civil rights movement of the 1960s.

== Production ==
Ethnic Notions was Riggs's first professional feature documentary. It was produced in association with public television station KQED in San Francisco.

== Content ==
The documentary describes the history of stereotypes which contributed to anti-Black prejudice in the United States, and examines the caricature of Black people in U.S. popular culture from the late nineteenth and early twentieth centuries, starting with the ante-bellum period and ending at the advent of the Civil rights movement of the 1960s.

The film uses voice-over narration provided by African-American actress Esther Rolle in explaining film footage and historical stills. It also presents a set of contemporary interviews with historians George Fredrickson and Lawrence Levine, the cultural critic Barbara Christian, folklorist Patricia Turner, choreographer Leni Sloan, and Black memorabilia collector Jan Faulkner, who discuss the consequences of historical African-American stereotypes.

Stereotypes described in the film include The Tom, The Sambo, The Mammy, The Coon, The Brute, The Pickaninnies, and The Minstrels. The stereotypes are shown in different mediums such as cartoons, feature films, popular songs, minstrel shows, advertisements, folklore, household artifacts, and children's rhymes.

The documentary touches upon issues of servility, sexuality, appearances, the noble savage, and the impact of mass media on the image of African Americans and how this affects their self-image.

== Reception ==
Ethnic Notions won a national Emmy Award, as well as awards at multiple film festivals. It became a core text in college courses across the United States.
