= Silverlake Life: The View from Here =

1993 documentary film

Silverlake Life: The View from Here is a 1993 documentary film by directors Peter Friedman (not the actor of the same name) and Tom Joslin. Shot with a hand-held video camera, the film documents the relationship between two gay men—Tom Joslin (November 29, 1946 – July 1, 1990) and his partner, Mark Massi (July 21, 1948 – July 11, 1991)—as they confront AIDS, their illness, and Joslin's death. They lived in Silver Lake, Los Angeles.

Joslin and Massi had previously collaborated on Blackstar: Autobiography of a Close Friend (1976), a "mixed-genre experimental documentary about coming out of the closet in the early years of the gay liberation movement". The film, which explores Joslin's relationship with his parents and with his lover Massi, is excerpted within Silverlake Life to give context to those family dynamics.

The first-person style of Silverlake Life underlines its intimacy, honesty, and realism. Co-director Peter Friedman describes it as "a film about ordinary life" and the struggles of mundane tasks such as errands and doctor's visits for those who are ill; he also emphasizes its identity as a love story between Tom and Mark, who were partners for over 20 years. While Joslin originally conceived the film as a project about Massi's illness, its focus changed to Joslin's own battle with AIDS as he became more ill himself. He called upon Friedman, a friend and former film student, to complete the film in the event that he was unable to.

Scholar Ross Chambers has argued that the sequence of Joslin's death at the climax of the film is an intentional request of the viewer to witness, rather than look away, and to accept a responsibility to continue the work of advocacy begun by the film.

The film won several awards including a 1994 Peabody Award. It shared the 1993 Grand Jury Prize at the Sundance Film Festival with the film Children of Fate: Life and Death in a Sicilian Family.
