= Routes of Exile: A Moroccan Jewish Odyssey =

- Directed by: Eugene Rosow
- Written by: Linda Post
- Produced by: Howard Dratch, Vivian Kleiman, Eugene Rosow
- Narrated by: Paul Frees
- Edited by: Eugene Rosow; Anne Stein
- Release date: 1982
- Running time: 90 minutes
- Country: United States
- Languages: English, Arabic, French and Hebrew with English translation.

Routes of Exile: A Moroccan Jewish Odyssey is a 1982 documentary about the origin and history of the Moroccan Jews, directed and produced by Eugene Rosow with producers Howard Dratch & Vivian Kleiman. Beginning with a history of two thousand years of Jewish life in Morocco, the movie incorporates extensive archival footage, as well as interviews with: artists, scholars, journalists, merchants, workers, and artisans in Morocco, Israel, France, and Canada.

== Plot ==
Beginning in ancient Morocco, the film begins by describing the Berber Jews. Jewish life in Morocco is shown with scenes of a wedding and a bris. The head of a Berber village describes how the Jewish community was established in the village, and the narrative goes on to recount the details of the second wave of Jewish immigration from the Iberian Peninsula following the Spanish Inquisition. Various historians, government officials, and members of Jewish civic and cultural life in Morocco discuss the relationship between Berber Jews and the more recently arrived Sephardic Jews, and place these into the context of the larger history of Morocco. Included is a discussion of the impact of French culture and schools on the Moroccan Jews during Morocco's tenure as a French Protectorate.

The film goes on to recount the effects of the World War II political situation on the Moroccan Jews and the subsequent creation of the state of Israel, covering the different waves of immigration to Israel and the political and cultural situations of Moroccan Jewish arrivals, who reacted in various ways to their placement in Israeli frontier border settlements and the discrimination against them by European Jews who held much of the power. Also discussed is the wave of immigration to Canada, specifically Montreal, with a segment on the distinct cultural reactions of the Moroccan Jews to a new life in the Canadian state.
