= Peter Barris =

American businessman and venture capitalist

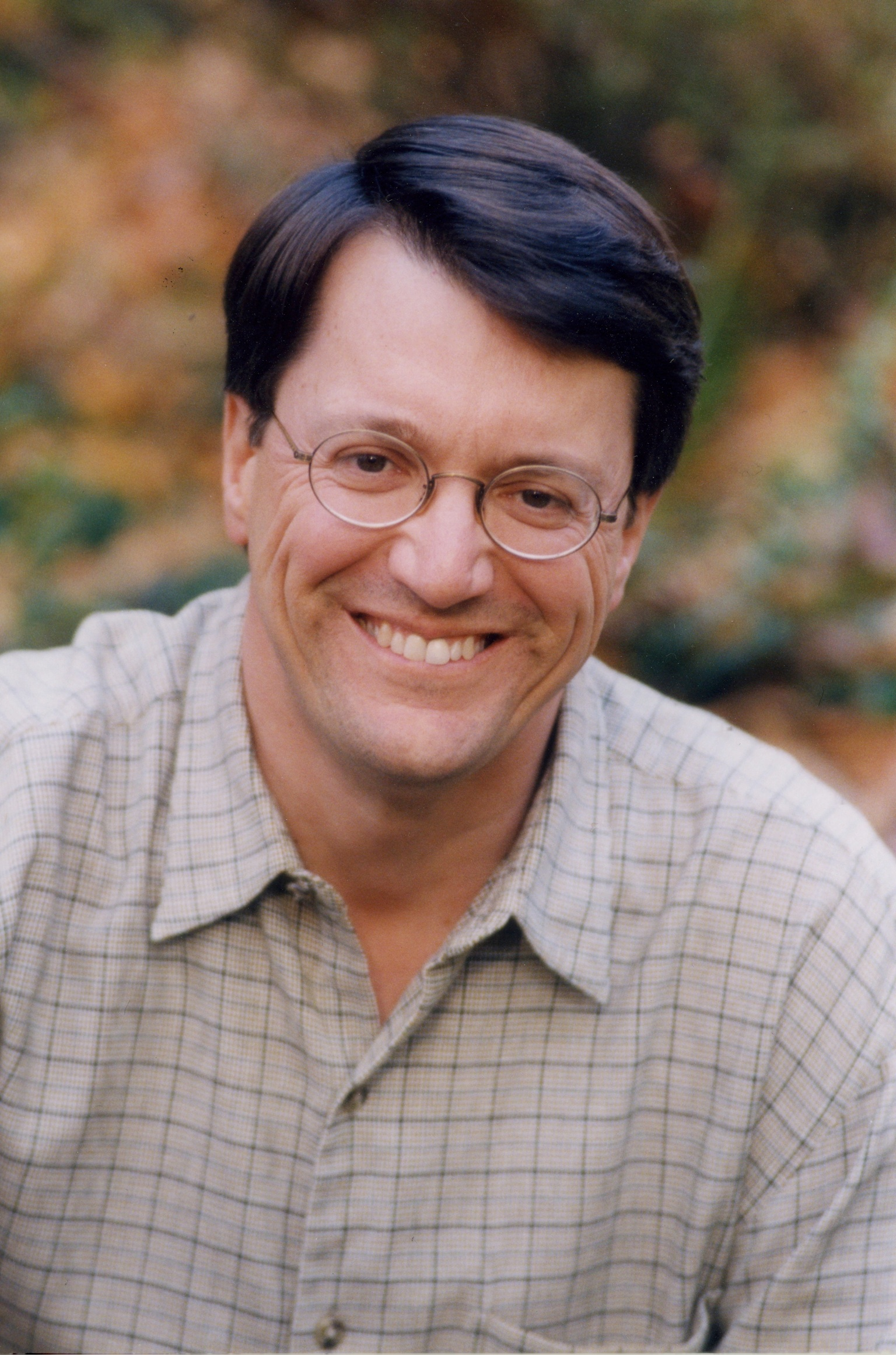
- Education: Dartmouth College and Northwestern University
- Occupation: Venture capitalist
- Employer: New Enterprise Associates (NEA)

Peter Barris is an American businessman and venture capitalist. He is a founding venture capital investor in Groupon.

Barris is currently on the board of directors of nine companies; Broadview Networks Holdings, Inc., Echo Global Logistics, Inc., Groupon, Hillcrest Laboratories, Inc., InnerWorkings, Inc., Jobfox, Inc., MediaBank, SnagFilms, Vonage Holdings Corp, and ZeroFOX. Barris is often featured on the Forbes Midas list and was ranked #8 on the list in 2011.

== Business career ==
Barris joined the venture capital firm New Enterprise Associates (NEA) in 1992 and has served as managing general partner since 1999. Prior to joining NEA, Barris was president and chief operating officer of Legent Corporation (LGNT) and senior vice president of the Systems Software Division of UCCEL Corporation (UCE). Both companies were ultimately acquired at valuations that were record breaking for their time. Earlier, Barris spent almost a decade at General Electric Company in a variety of management positions, including vice president and general manager at GE Information Services.

== Career at NEA ==
Since joining NEA, Barris has led investments in over 25 information technology companies that have completed public offerings or successful mergers. These include such industry pioneering companies as Amisys, InnerWorkings, Neutral Tandem, UUNET, and Vonage. Additionally, Barris was also the principal investor in CareerBuilder and JobFox.

== Education ==
Barris received a bachelor of science in electrical engineering from Northwestern University and a master of business administration from Dartmouth College.

== Other activities ==
Barris has served on the Northwestern University board of trustees, the Dartmouth Tuck School board of overseers. He has overseen the investigation into hazing allegations into the Northwestern Football program since its inception, according to the University President. He previously served on the executive committee of the board of the National Venture Capital Association and was also a founding member of Venture Philanthropy Partners, a philanthropic organization in the Washington, D.C., area. Barris contributed to the Archbishop Iakovos Leadership 100 Endowment Fund.
