= George Barris =

George Barris is the name of:

- George Barris (auto customizer) (1925–2015), designer of custom made cars
- George Barris (photographer) (1922–2016), photographer in the U.S. Army and of Hollywood stars
