= Bo Huston =

American writer (1959–1993)

- Born: June 10, 1959; Chagrin Falls, Ohio
- Died: May 24, 1993 (aged 33); San Francisco, California
- Occupations: Novelist, short story writer
- Spouse: Dan Carmell (1987–1993)
- Writing career
- Period: 1990s
- Notable works: Dream Life, The Listener

Paul Richard "Bo" Huston (June 10, 1959 – May 24, 1993) was an American writer.

Born Paul Richard Huston, in Chagrin Falls, Ohio, he attended Hampshire College in Massachusetts, and spent the best part of the 1980s exploring the New York scene. He marched in the first March on Washington, DC, in 1979 and took great joy in the outlaw aspect of gay culture. He was briefly a film student at New York University in the early 1980s, but withdrew from the program and worked in typesetting.

Moving to San Francisco in 1987, he took a typesetting job with an advertising agency and met his longterm partner Dan Carmell, but left the advertising job in 1988 after being diagnosed HIV-positive and devoted the remainder of his life to writing.

He was a regular columnist for the San Francisco Bay Times, was a cofounder of the LGBT literary conference Out/Write, and published his first short story collection Horse and Other Stories in 1990. He followed up with the novels Remember Me in 1991 and Dream Life in 1992.

He died of AIDS in 1993. A collection of short stories, The Listener, was posthumously published in 1993.

He was a three-time Lambda Literary Award nominee, garnering nods for Gay Debut Fiction at the 3rd Lambda Literary Awards in 1991 for Horse and Other Stories, for Gay Fiction at the 5th Lambda Literary Awards in 1993 for Dream Life, and for Gay Fiction at the 6th Lambda Literary Awards in 1994 for The Listener. The Listener also won the Gregory Kolovakos Award for AIDS Literature.

After Huston's death, Carmell and lesbian writer Dorothy Allison coparented a child together.

== Works ==
- Horse and Other Stories (1990)
- Remember Me (1991)
- Dream Life (1992)
- The Listener (1993)
