= Macarena Gomez-Barris =

Chilean-American scholar and writer

Macarena Gómez Barris
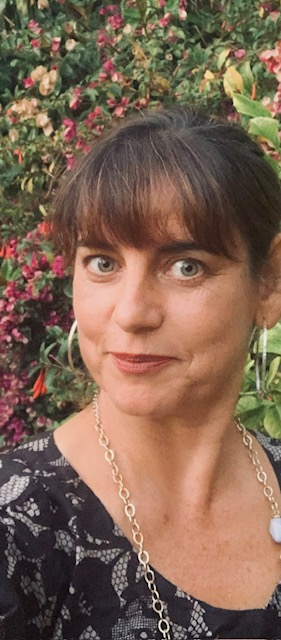
- Born: Santiago, Chile

Academic background
- Education: University of California, Santa Cruz (PhD)

Academic work
- Institutions: Brown University
- Main interests: environmental humanities, extractivism, media environment, racial ecologies, decolonial thought

Macarena Gómez Barris is an interdisciplinary scholar, writer, and academic whose work focuses on decolonial environmental humanities, extractivism, queer Latinx epistemologies, media environments, racial ecologies and artistic practices. She was a Fulbright fellow at FLACSO Ecuador's Sociology and Gender Department in Quito and served as Director of the Hemispheric Institute for Performance Studies in 2014.

She co-edits the Dissident Acts series with Diana Taylor at Duke University Press, serves on the GLQ board, and is a collective member of Social Text.

Currently, She is the Timothy C. Forbes and Anne S. Harrison University Professor and Chair of the Department of Modern Culture and Media at Brown University. She is the inaugural Director of the Center for Environmental Humanities at Brown University.

She is the recipient of Pratt Institute Research Recognition Award (2021–2022).

Her essays and articles have been featured in Antipode, Social Text and GLQ.

== Early life and education ==
She was born in Santiago, Chile, and immigrated to Northern California with her family during the early years of Augusto Pinochet's dictatorship. She holds a Ph.D. in Sociology and American Studies from the University of California, Santa Cruz.

== Career ==
She began her academic career in 2004 at the University of Southern California, where she served as an Assistant Professor in both the Department of American Studies and Ethnicity and the Department of Sociology until February 2010. She was promoted to Associate Professor in the Department of American Studies and Ethnicity, holding that position from February 2010 to May 2016, and later served as a Full Professor from May to September 2016.

Gómez-Barris held a professorship at Pratt Institute, where she served as the Chairperson of the Department of Social Science and Cultural Studies and the Director of the Global South, a transdisciplinary hub for experimental research and activist praxis.

In September 2017, she used the term Chicanx in her catalog essay on the work of photographer Laura Aguilar, an artist in the Chicanx community to explore the intersections of race, gender, and identity within the broader context of Chicanx culture and the complexities of identity in American studies, sociology, and ethnicity

She was a Visiting Associate Professor at the Facultad Latinoamericana de Ciencias Sociales (FLACSO) in the Department of Sociology and Gender from January to July 2015 and was a Fulbright Scholar. She also served as a Visiting Associate Professor at New York University’s Department of Social and Cultural Analysis in Fall 2014, where she focused on Latino Studies. During the same period, Gomez-Barris was the Acting Director of the Hemispheric Institute for Performance and Politics at NYU.

From 2016 to 2020, she was the Executive Council Chairperson of the Hemispheric Institute.

She is currently the Chair of the Modern Culture and Media Department at Brown University, a position she has held since July 2022. Additionally, she serves on the faculty and advisory board of the Brown Arts Institute. Her work fosters a transdisciplinarity approach to the study of decolonization, environmental crises, and social movements. Gómez-Barris is recognized for her contributions to environmental media studies and decolonial theory.

Gómez-Barris is an active public speaker and has participated in conferences, symposiums, and public discussions on decolonial theory, environmental justice, and the role of art in political transformation. She is also a curator, organising events that intersect with her research on extractivism, art, and decolonial politics.

On October 28, 2019 appeared twice on Democracy Now! to discuss the protests in Chile.

She also contributed to the art project Artists-in-Presidents: Transmissions to Power, initiated by Constance Hockaday, which subverts traditional models of political addresses. This project features 21 artists, thinkers, and writers, including Gómez-Barris. In a letter published in Blackwood Gallery, she addressed to Earth, Madre Tierra, Pachamama, Gómez-Barris laments the damage caused by colonialism and capitalism, while urging resistance to ecocide. She is also a fiction writer and wrote an excerpt for mousse magazine called Chuquicamata.

Gomez-Barris co-edited Towards A Sociology of a Trace in 2010 with Herman Gray and co-edited a special issue of American Quarterly in Fall 2014 on Las Américas Quarterly with Licia Fiol-Matta.

She co-curated the 2022 symposium Back to Earth: Queer Ecologies at the Serpentine Gallery and appeared on the related podcast Back to Earth: Queer Currents.

== Research ==
Her work examines the colonial legacies that continue to influence environmental and social justice issues, particularly in Latin America. She explores how colonialism has shaped contemporary ecological destruction, including resource extraction and the marginalisation of Indigenous cultures.

In the environmental humanities, Gómez-Barris critiques the dominant narratives around climate change, challenging the universal concept of the Anthropocene.

She introduces the framework of the Colonial Anthropocene to highlight the racial and colonial roots of environmental harm, particularly its disproportionate effects on marginalised communities in the Global South.

Her book The Extractive Zone: Social Ecologies and Decolonial Perspectives (2017) explores the impact of extractive capitalism on Indigenous territories in South America, emphasizing decolonial political strategies and aesthetics used by Indigenous artists and activists.

=== Decolonial Theory ===
Gómez-Barris's scholarship is rooted in decolonial thought, particularly in her critique of the Anthropocene as a universal framework for environmental damage. She argues that the term "Anthropocene" obscures the colonial origins of the ecological crisis, specifically the role of extractive capitalism in perpetuating environmental harm. By introducing the concept of the "colonial Anthropocene," she emphasizes that ecological destruction results not from human activity in general, but from specific colonial and capitalist processes.

== Awards ==
- ·Fulbright Award 2020–2021 Pratt Research Award.
- 2020–2021 Graduate Distinguished Alumni Award, University of California, Santa Cruz
- Andy Warhol Curatorial Award

== Selected publications ==
=== Books ===
- Gomez-Barris, Macarena (2009). Where memory dwells: culture and state violence in Chile. Berkeley: University of California Press. ISBN 978-0-520-25583-8.
- Gray, Herman; Gómez-Barris, Macarena, eds. (2010). Toward a sociology of the trace. Minneapolis, Minn: University of Minnesota Press. ISBN 978-0-8166-5598-4.
- Gómez-Barris, Macarena (2017). The extractive zone: social ecologies and decolonial perspectives. Dissident acts. Durham: Duke University Press. ISBN 978-0-8223-7256-1.
- Gómez-Barris, Macarena (2018-08-28). Beyond the Pink Tide. University of California Press. doi:10.2307/j.ctvq4bz72. ISBN 978-0-520-96906-3.
- Gómez-Barris, Macarena; Fiol-Matta, Licia (2014). "Introduction: Las Américas Quarterly". American Quarterly. 66 (3): 493–504. doi:10.1353/aq.2014.0053. ISSN 1080-6490.
- Gómez-Barris, Macarena (2021-08-01). La zona extractiva. Metales Pesados. doi:10.2307/j.ctv1wgvbf0. ISBN 978-956-6048-55-8.

=== Journals ===
- Gómez-Barris, Macarena (2010). "Witness Citizenship: The Place of Villa Grimaldi in Chilean Memory". Sociological Forum. 25 (1): 27–46. doi:10.1111/j.1573-7861.2009.01155.x. ISSN 0884-8971.
- Gómez-Barris, Macarena (2014-12-22). "Mapuche mnemonics: Beyond modernity's violence". Memory Studies. 8 (1): 75–85. doi:10.1177/1750698014552410. ISSN 1750-6980.
- Gómez-Barris, Macarena (2010). "Visual Testimonies of Atrocity: Archives of Political Violence in Chile and Guatemala". Journal of Visual Culture. 9 (3): 409–419. doi:10.1177/1470412910380345. ISSN 1470-4129.
- Sandoval, Roberto Castillo (2012). "Macarena Gómez-Barris. Where Memory Dwells: Culture and State Violence in Chile. Where Memory Dwells. Culture and State Violence in Chile. By Macarena Gómez-Barris. Berkeley: University of California Press, 2008. Pp. xvi, 216. Illustrations, Notes,Bibliography, Index $24.95 paper". The Americas. 68 (4): 606–608. doi:10.1017/s0003161500001607. ISSN 0003-1615.
- Gómez-Barris, Macarena (2022-04-11), "Submerged perspectives: the arts of land and water defense", Time, Climate Change, Global Racial Capitalism and Decolonial Planetary Ecologies, London: Routledge, pp. 46–55, doi:10.4324/9781003278054-4, ISBN 978-1-003-27805-4

== See also ==
- Herman Gray
