= Barris =

Barris may refer to:

== Places ==
- Nou Barris, district of Barcelona, Spain
- Vaza-Barris River, Brazil

== Entertainment ==
- Barris Industries, American former television production company founded by Chuck Barris
- The Barris Beat, Canadian variety television series
- Barris and Company, Canadian variety and talk TV show

== Other uses ==
- Barris (surname)
- Barriss Offee, a Jedi apprentice in the prequel era of the Star Wars universe
- Moss Barris, a character in the novel Star Wars: Thrawn
