= Marlon Riggs =

American film director (1957–1994)

- Born: Marlon Troy Riggs; February 3, 1957; Fort Worth, Texas, U.S.
- Died: April 5, 1994 (aged 37); Oakland, California, U.S.
- Cause of death: Complications from AIDS
- Occupations: Filmmaker, educator
- Partner: Jack Vincent

Marlon Troy Riggs (February 3, 1957 – April 5, 1994) was an American filmmaker, educator, poet, and activist. He produced, wrote, and directed several documentary films, including Ethnic Notions, Tongues Untied, Color Adjustment, and Black Is... Black Ain't. Being Black and gay, his films examine past and present representations of race and sexuality in the United States. The Marlon Riggs Collection is open to the public at Stanford University Libraries.

== Early life ==
Riggs was born in Fort Worth, Texas, on February 3, 1957. He was a child of civilian employees of the military and spent a great deal of his childhood traveling. He lived in Texas and Georgia before moving to West Germany at the age of 11 with his family. He was the son of Jean (mother) and Alvin Riggs (father) and also had a sibling named Sascha.

Later in his life, Riggs recalled the ostracism and name-calling that he experienced at Hephzibah Junior High School in Hephzibah, Georgia. He stated that Black and white students alike called him a "punk", a "faggot," and "Uncle Tom." He felt isolated from everyone at the school: "I was caught between these two worlds where the whites hated me and the Blacks disparaged me. It was so painful."

Riggs excelled at Nurnberg American High School, where he played football and ran track, and was elected President of the Varsity Club while only a sophomore. He also performed a solo interpretive dance in the school's talent show depicting American slaves' experiences from Africa through emancipation. From 1973 to 1974 Riggs attended Ansbach American High School's opening year in Katterbach, Germany. He was elected student body president at the military dependents school. In 1974, Riggs returned to the United States to attend college. As an undergraduate, he studied history at Harvard University and graduated magna cum laude in 1978.

While a student at Harvard, Riggs realized that he was gay. Because there were no courses that supported the study of homosexuality, he petitioned the History Department and received approval to pursue independent study of the portrayal of "male homosexuality in American fiction and poetry". As he began studying the history of American racism and homophobia, Riggs became interested in communicating his ideas about these subjects through journalism.

After working for a local television station in Texas for about a year, he moved to Oakland, California, where he lived with his domestic partner, Jack Vincent, until Riggs passed away 15 years later. Riggs entered graduate school and received his master's degree in journalism with a specialization in documentary film in 1981 from the University of California, Berkeley, having co-produced/co-directed with Peter Webster a master's thesis titled Long Train Running: The Story of the Oakland Blues, a half-hour video on the history of blues music in Oakland, California.

== Film career ==
After finishing graduate school, Riggs began working on many independent documentary productions in the Bay Area. He assisted documentary directors and producers (among them Bill Jersey) initially as an assistant editor and later as a post-production supervisor or editor on documentaries about the American arms race, Nicaragua, Central America, sexism and disability rights. Because of his proficiency in video technology, he was the on-line editor for the video production company, Espresso Productions, co-owned by one of his former professors at UCB. In 1987, he was hired as a part-time faculty member at the Graduate School of Journalism at Berkeley to teach documentary filmmaking. He became the youngest tenured professor in the arts and humanities at UC Berkeley.

In 1987, he completed his first professional feature documentary Ethnic Notions. An independently produced documentary, the film was inspired by an exhibit of Black memorabilia at the Berkeley Art Center of Black stereotypes from the collection of Jan Faulkner. The film received technical support (online editing) from KQED, a public television station in San Francisco, and was shown on public television stations throughout the United States. In Ethnic Notions, Riggs sought to explore widespread and persistent stereotypes of African Americans – images of ugly, savage brutes and happy servants – in American popular culture of the late 19th and early 20th centuries.

Edited by Debbie Hoffmann, the film uses voice-over narration provided by African-American actress Esther Rolle in explaining striking film footage and historical stills which expose the blatant racism of the era immediately following the Civil War. The documentary also presents a set of contemporary interviews with historians George Fredrickson and Lawrence Levine, the cultural critic Barbara Christian, folklorist Patricia Turner, and Black memorabilia collector Jan Faulkner, who discuss the consequences of historical African-American stereotypes.

In 1989, Riggs completed the landmark experimental documentary film Tongues Untied. It was broadcast on national PBS as part of the television series P.O.V. The three principal poets of Tongues Untied are those of Riggs, and the poets Essex Hemphill and Joseph Beam. Tongues Untied had political backlash; Republican Senator Jesse Helms famously argued to defund the arts after its release.

In 1988, while working both on Color Adjustment and Tongues Untied, Riggs was diagnosed with HIV after undergoing treatment for near-fatal kidney failure at a hospital in Germany. Despite his deteriorating health, he decided to continue to teach at Berkeley and make documentaries.

In the short 1990 piece Affirmations, Riggs explored the African-American males' sexuality and relationship with the African-American community at large. Some of the men expressed the lack of acceptance within the African-American community and the divide their sexual orientation caused. In 1991, Riggs directed and produced Anthem, a short documentary about African-American male sexuality. Collaborator Christiane Badgley served as co-director and editor.

In 1991, Riggs founded Signifyin' Works, a non-profit production company that produces films about African-American history and culture.

The 1992 documentary Color Adjustment was Riggs's second film shown on P.O.V., focusing on the representation of African Americans in primetime television from Amos 'n' Andy to The Cosby Show. The film was produced with Vivian Kleiman, edited by Debbie Hoffmann, and narrated by the actress Ruby Dee. It includes an original music score by Mary Watkins.

In 1992, Riggs directed the film Non, Je Ne Regrette Rien (No Regret), in which five Black gay men who are HIV-positive discuss how they are battling the double stigmas surrounding their infection and homosexuality. It was edited by Nicole Atkinson. The series was screened on World AIDS Day and Day Without Art. It included the participation of Phil Zwickler, David Wojnarowicz, Ellen Spiro, Vivian Kleiman, and others.

In 1993, Riggs received an honorary doctorate from the California College of Arts and Crafts. The same year, his experimental short Anthem was featured in Frameline's collection of short films entitled Boys' Shorts: The New Queer Cinema.

Shortly after completing Color Adjustment, Riggs began work on what was to be his final film, Black Is...Black Ain't, but he died at the age of 37 from complications caused by AIDS on April 5, 1994, before he could complete it. The project was completed posthumously by the co-producer Nicole Atkinson and the co-director/editor Christiane Badgley, under the supervision of the board of directors of Signifyin' Works: Herman Gray, Vivian Kleiman, and Patricia Turner.

All of his documentaries originated in video and were transferred to film for public screenings at theaters, festivals and museums. At that time, video technology was not yet available for screening for large audiences at public venues.

== Writings ==
Riggs's writings were published during the late 1980s and early 1990s in various art and literary journals such as Black American Literature Forum, Art Journal, and High Performance Magazine as well as anthologies such as Brother to Brother: Collected Writings by Black Gay Men.

In his essay "Black Macho Revisited: Reflections of a SNAP! Queen," Riggs discusses how representations of Black gay men in the United States have been used to shape Americans' conceptions of race and sexuality. He argues that Americans' emphasis on the "black macho" figure – the warrior model of Black masculinity based on a mythologized view of African history – signifies an exclusion of Black homosexual males from the African-American community, which results in their dehumanization and rationalizes homophobia.

Riggs also wrote poetry, and Tongues Untied contains several of his poems about his life experiences as a Black gay man.

== Themes and style ==
Riggs's films deal with representations of race and sexuality in the United States. Riggs was critical of American racism and homophobia. He used his films to show positive images of African-American culture as well as those of physical and emotional love between Black men in order to challenge representations of African Americans and Black gay men in popular culture.

As a graduate student at Berkeley, Riggs was educated in journalism and conventional documentary filmmaking, which stresses objectivity and an academic stance. However his film style eventually expanded to include a very personal and emotional filmic approach.

== Legacy ==
Riggs's documentaries have received much critical acclaim. Riggs received a national Emmy Award in 1987 for Ethnic Notions. Tongues Untied was awarded the Teddy Award at the Berlin Film Festival. The film received recognition from the Los Angeles Film Critics Association, the New York Documentary Film Festival, the American Film and Video Festival, and the San Francisco International Lesbian and Gay Film Festival.

In 1992, Riggs was awarded the Maya Daren Lifetime Achievement Award from the American Film Institute. Additionally, Color Adjustment won the prestigious George Foster Peabody Award, Erik Barnouw Award from the Organization of American Historians, the International Documentary Association Outstanding Achievement Award, and a premiere screening the Sundance Film Festival. Producer/Research Director Vivian Kleiman garnered a nomination for a National Emmy Award for Outstanding Individual Achievement in Research.

Riggs received the Frameline Award from the San Francisco International Lesbian and Gay Film Festival for his film Non, Je Ne Regrette Rien (No Regret). Black Is...Black Ain't won the Golden Gate Award at the San Francisco International Film Festival and was praised by the Sundance Film Festival.

In 1993, Riggs received an Honorary Doctorate from the California College of Arts and Crafts in Oakland.

There is a section of a subsidized housing unit named The Marlon Riggs Apartments/Vernon Street located in Oakland, California. In 1996, a plaque with a picture of Marlon was hung inside of the building's lobby area. At the time, the housing unit was the East Bay's first building constructed for low-income people with HIV/AIDS.

In 1996, two years after Riggs's death, Karen Everett completed a biographical documentary about him, titled I Shall Not Be Removed: The Life of Marlon Riggs.

In 2006, Riggs was inducted into the NLGJA LGBTQ Journalists Hall of Fame.

In 2014, Signifyin' Works challenged the University of California at Berkeley School of Journalism to match a donation of $100,000 and create the "Marlon T. Riggs Fellowship in Documentary Filmmaking." It was the first fellowship named for a documentary filmmaker at a university in the United States. That endowment reached $500,000 thanks to the Ford Foundation and other donors.

In 2018, Signifyin' Works received a grant from the Ford Foundation in support of "Tongues Untied@30," a year-long series of global screenings to honor the 30th anniversary of the release of Tongues Untied in 1989. Signifyin' Works President Vivian Kleiman and Brooklyn Academy of Music film curator Ashley Clark collaborated to launch the year with a retrospective Race, Sex & Cinema: The World of Marlon Riggs.

Other screenings included: Los Angeles, Mexico City, Atlanta, London, Paris, Bogota, Istanbul, Mumbai, and beyond. In addition, the 78th Annual Peabody Awards recognized Riggs and Tongues Untied with a tribute presented by Billy Porter, writer and star performer of the FX Peabody Award-winning series, "Pose".

In 2022 Tongues Untied was added to the Library of Congress's National Film Registry for being "culturally, historically, or aesthetically significant."

=== In popular culture ===
Episode six of the second season of Pose ends with a quote by Riggs.

== Controversy ==
Prior to a further release to the public on national television after its run in festivals, Riggs's production Tongues Untied triggered a national controversy surrounding the airing of the video on American public television stations. Along with his own funds, Riggs had financed the documentary with a $5,000 grant from the Western States Regional Arts Fund, a re-granting agency funded by the National Endowment for the Arts, an independent federal agency that provides funding and support for visual, literary, and performing artists. The film received much contention due to its depiction of two men kissing.

News of the film's airing sparked a national debate about whether or not it is appropriate for the federal government to fund artistic creations that offended some. Artists stressed their basic right of free speech, of representation on public airwaves, and vehemently opposed censorship of their art. However, several right-wing United States government policymakers and many conservative groups were against using taxpayer money to fund what they claimed were repulsive artistic works. In actuality taxpayer money did not support the film, which received a small grant from the Western States Regional Arts Fellowship, a re-granting entity.

In the 1992 Republican presidential primaries, presidential candidate Pat Buchanan cited Tongues Untied as an example of how President George H. W. Bush was investing "our tax dollars in pornographic and blasphemous art." Buchanan released an anti-Bush television advertisement for his campaign using re-edited clips from Tongues Untied. The ad was removed from television channels after Riggs successfully demonstrated Buchanan's copyright infringement.

Reverend Donald E. Wildmon, the president of the American Family Association, opposed PBS and the National Endowment for the Arts for airing Tongues Untied but hoped that the film would be widely released because he believed most Americans would find it offensive. "This will be the first time millions of Americans will have an opportunity to see the kinds of things their tax money is being spent on," he said. "This is the first time there is no third party telling them what is going on; they can see for themselves."

Riggs defended Tongues Untied for its ability to "shatter this nation's brutalizing silence on matters of sexual and racial difference." In his defense, Riggs claimed that "implicit in the much overworked rhetoric about "community standards" is the assumption of only one central community and only one overarching cultural standard to which television programming must necessarily appeal."

== Death ==
Marlon Riggs died in his home on April 5, 1994. Jack Vincent, his life partner, stated that the cause of death was due to complications from HIV/AIDS.

== Filmography as director ==
- Long Train Running: A History of the Oakland Blues (1981)
- Ethnic Notions (1986)
- Tongues Untied (1989) (later aired on POV in 1991)
- Affirmations (1990)
- Anthem (1991)
- Color Adjustment (1992) (later aired on POV in 1992)
- Non, Je Ne Regrette Rien (No Regret) (1993)
- Black is... Black Ain't (1994)
