= Essex Hemphill =

American writer and activist (1957–1995)

- Born: April 16, 1957; Chicago, Illinois, U.S.
- Died: November 4, 1995 (aged 38); Philadelphia, Pennsylvania U.S.
- Occupations: Poet, activist

Essex Hemphill (April 16, 1957 – November 4, 1995) was an openly gay American poet and activist. He is known for his contributions to the Washington, D.C., art scene in the 1980s, and for openly discussing the topics pertinent to the African-American gay community.

== Biography ==
=== Early life ===
Essex Hemphill was born April 16, 1957, in Chicago, Illinois, to Warren and Mantalene Hemphill, and was the eldest of five children. Early in his life, he moved to Washington D.C., where he attended Ballou High School. He began writing poetry at the age of fourteen, writing about his own thoughts, family life, and budding sexuality. After graduation, he enrolled at the University of Maryland in 1975 to study journalism. Though he left college after his freshman year, he continued to interact with the D.C. art scene: performing spoken word, working on journals, and beginning to publish his first poetry chapbooks. He later received a degree in English at the University of the District of Columbia.

=== Career ===
In 1979, Hemphill and his colleagues started the Nethula Journal of Contemporary Literature, a publication aimed at showcasing the works of modern Black artists. One of his first public readings was arranged by E. Ethelbert Miller at Howard University’s Founder Library where he performed alongside and befriended filmmaker Michelle Parkerson. He also performed at other institutions, including Harvard University, the University of Pennsylvania, and the University of California at Los Angeles.

In 1982, Essex Hemphill, Larry Duckett, his close friend, and Wayson Jones, his university roommate, founded the spoken word group Cinque, which performed in the Washington D.C., area. Hemphill continued performing his spoken word poetry, and in 1983, received a grant from Washington Project for the Arts to perform an "experimental dramatization" of poetry entitled Murder on Glass, alongside Parkerson and Jones. Hemphill also began publishing his own collections of poetry during this time, beginning with Diamonds Was in the Kitty and Some of the People We Love (1982) and followed by the more favorably reviewed Earth Life (1985) and Conditions (1986). He garnered more national attention when his work was included in In the Life (1986), an anthology of poems from Black gay artists, compiled by Hemphill's good friend, lover, and fellow author, Joseph Beam. His poetry was published widely in journals, and his essays appeared in Obsidian, The Black Scholar, CALLALOO, and Essence, among others. In 1986, Hemphill received a fellowship in poetry from the National Endowment for the Arts.

Hemphill also made appearances in a number of documentaries between 1989 and 1992. In 1989, he appeared in Looking for Langston, a film directed by Isaac Julien about poet Langston Hughes and the Harlem Renaissance. Hemphill worked with filmmaker Marlon Riggs on two documentaries: Tongues Untied (1989), which looked into the complex overlap of Black and queer identities, and Black Is... Black Ain't (1992), which discussed what exactly constitutes "Blackness."

After Beam's death from AIDS in 1988, Hemphill and Beam's mother worked together to publish his sequel to In the Life. The second manuscript was published in 1991 under the title Brother to Brother: New Writings by Black Gay Men, which archived the works of about three dozen authors, including Hemphill. Writing about Hemphill and Beam in his book, Evidence of Being: The Black Gay Cultural Renaissance and the Politics of Violence, Darius Bost notes that Hemphill moved in with Beam's mother to help finish the anthology, taking on domestic tasks in exchange for room and board. He writes that Hemphill said in an interview that the anthology “was produced in the ‘context of confronting AIDS and the death around us. It's almost like a fierce resistance that says, 'Before I die, I'm going to say these things.'” Hemphill also wrote a poem dedicated to Beam after his death titled “When My Brother Fell,” and dedicated his 1986 poem “Heavy Corners” to him. In 1990, he gave a speech at the OutWrite conference (where he was the only Black panelist), which eventually became the introduction to the anthology. Brother to Brother won a Lambda Literary Award.

In 1992, Hemphill published his largest collection of poetry and short stories, entitled Ceremonies: Prose and Poetry, which included previously unpublished work as well as selections from his earlier poetry collections, Earth Life and Conditions. The next year, the anthology was awarded the National Library Association's Gay, Lesbian, and Bisexual New Author Award, the Stonewall Book Award for Literature, and a Pew Charitable Trust Fellowship in the Arts. In 1993, he was a visiting scholar at the Getty Center.

=== Death ===
In the 1990s, Hemphill rarely gave information about his health, although he occasionally talked about living as a person with AIDS. It was not until 1994 that he wrote about his experiences with the disease in his poem "Vital Signs." He died on November 4, 1995, of AIDS-related complications.

== Legacy ==
After his death, December 10, 1995, was announced by three organizations (Gay Men of African Descent, Other Countries, and Black Nations/Queer Nations?) to be a National Day of Remembrance for Essex Hemphill at New York City's Lesbian and Gay Community Services Center.

Cheryl Dunye dedicated her 1996 film The Watermelon Woman in part to Hemphill.

In his essay "(Re)- Recalling Essex Hemphill" in Words to Our Now, Thomas Glave pays tribute to Hemphill's life, focusing on the lasting effects of his actions. Glave writes:

The sheer giantry of your breathing presence has passed. Now present and future warriors—ourselves and others—will be compelled to learn, as you did and made manifest, that all hauls toward truth—toward venality; ardor, not arrogance; forthrightness, not cowardice.

In 2014, Martin Duberman wrote Hold Tight Gently: Michael Callen, Essex Hemphill, and the Battlefield of AIDS, in which he documents the life of Essex Hemphill, along with author and activist Michael Callen. The book won the Lambda Literary Award for Nonfiction.

In June 2019, Hemphill was one of the inaugural fifty American “pioneers, trailblazers, and heroes” inducted on the National LGBTQ Wall of Honor within the Stonewall National Monument (SNM) in New York City’s Stonewall Inn.

In March 2025, New Directions Publishing released a collection titled Love Is a Dangerous Word: The Selected Poems of Essex Hemphill. The collection was edited by John Keene and Robert Reid-Pharr. Publishers Weekly wrote:

"The collection brings Ceremonies back into print alongside a number of uncollected pieces pulled from the archives of such long-running publications as Obsidian, among others, spotlighting the work of a figure notable for his innovative and incendiary poetics and advocacy for Black LGBTQ+ and feminist art and activism."

From May 17 to August 31, 2025, The Phillips Collection exhibited Essex Hemphill: Take Care of Your Blessings, exploring the relationship between Hemphill’s writing and contemporary visual art.

== Themes ==
Much of Hemphill's poetry and spoken word is autobiographical, and portrays his experiences as a minority in both the African-American and LGBT communities.

He wrote pieces such as "Family Jewels," which conveys his frustrations about racism, specifically within the gay community. In his essay "Does Your Momma Know About me?" Hemphill criticizes photographer Robert Mapplethorpe's The Black Book, which showcased pictures of the penises of Black men. Hemphill argued that excluding the faces of the Black male subjects demonstrated the fetishism of African Americans by Whites in the gay community.

The poems and essays in Ceremonies address the sexual objectification of Black men in White culture, relationships between gay and straight Black men, HIV/AIDS in the Black community, and the meaning of family. Hemphill also critiques both the institutionalized patriarchy and dominant gender identities within society.

Hemphill repeatedly invokes loneliness throughout his work. Loneliness in Hemphill's work is a traumatic and constant sense of rejection. Many of the men he writes about returned home after being rejected by White gay communities, only to be rejected within Black communities as well. In Hemphill's poetry, he portrays loneliness as a collective feeling. He defines loneliness as suffering without public recognition. A sense of separation from the public creates a social longing for community and support.

== Works ==
=== Collections ===
- Conditions: Poems, Be Bop Books, 1986
- Ceremonies: Prose and Poetry, Plume, 1992

=== Essays ===
- "Vital Signs" in Thomas Avena (ed.), Life Sentences: Writers, Artists, and AIDS, Mercury House, 1994
- "The Other Invisible Man" in Patrick Merla (ed.), Boys Like Us: Gay Writers Tell Their Coming Out Stories, Avon Books, 1996

=== Anthologies ===
- In the Life
- Gay and Lesbian Poetry in Our Time
- Art Against Apartheid
- Men and Intimacy
- High Risk
- New Men
- New Minds
- Natives
- Tourists and Other Mysteries
- (ed.) Brother to Brother: New Writings by Black Gay Men, 1991; RedBone Press, 2007, ISBN 9780978625115

=== Appearances ===
- Looking for Langston (1989)
- Tongues Untied (1989)
- Black Is...Black Ain't (1994)
- Narrator: Out of the Shadows, AIDS documentary
