= Vivian Kleiman =

American documentary film producer

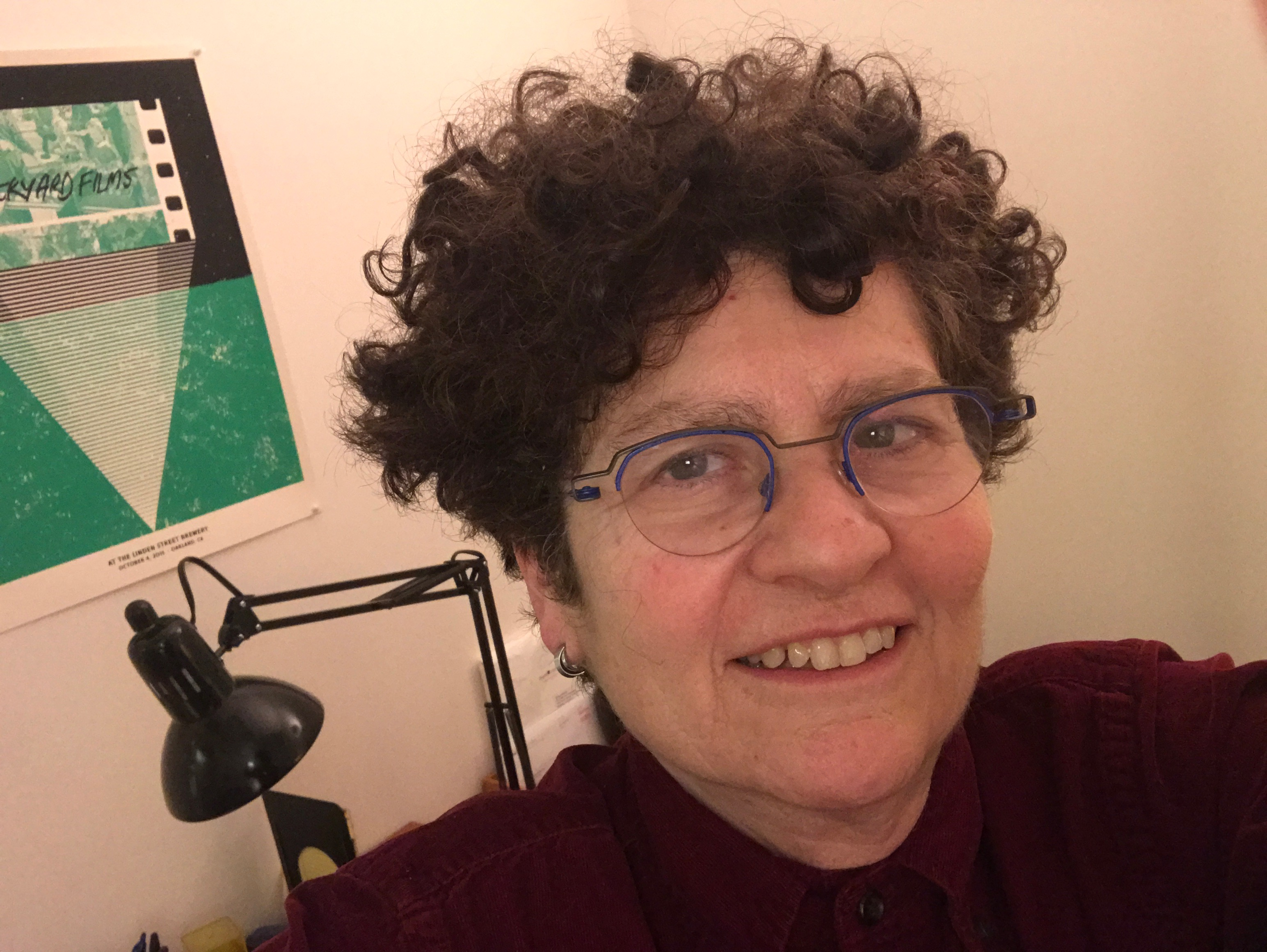
Vivian Kleiman documentary filmmaker

Vivian Kleiman is a Peabody Award winning documentary filmmaker. Other honors include a National Emmy Award nomination for Outstanding Individual Achievement in Research (producer/research director) and an Academy Award nomination for Documentary Short (executive producer).

Kleiman directed and produced the feature documentary No Straight Lines (2021), which chronicles the lives of five queer comic book artists (Alison Bechdel, Jennifer Camper, Howard Cruse, Rupert Kinnard, and Mary Wings) as they journey from the margins of the DIY underground comix scene to mainstream acceptance. The film premiered in June 2021 at Tribeca Film Festival, Sheffield Doc/Fest, and AFI DOCS. It also took home the Documentary Feature Grand Jury Prize at LA's Outfest, and the NLGJA: Association of LGBTQ Journalists Award for Excellence in Documentary Journalism. No Straight Lines was broadcast on the National PBS award-winning series Independent Lens January 2023.

In 2019, Kleiman was awarded a Eureka Fellowship of the Fleishhacker Foundation for visual artists of all media.

Also an educator, she served as Adjunct Faculty at Stanford University's Graduate Program in Documentary Film and Video Production from 1995–2004.

Kleiman was a long time collaborator with Black gay filmmaker Marlon Riggs. They founded Signifyin' Works in 1991, which creates and distributes films about the experiences of African Americans. Directed by Riggs, their 1992 film Color Adjustment screened at the Sundance Film Festival and received the International Documentary Association's IDA Award, the Erik Barnouw Award from the Organization of American Historians and the George Foster Peabody Award in 1993.

In 2024 she created outthevote.com - a social media campaign designed to encourage queer students on college campuses to vote.

Currently, Kleiman is completing a short film deconstructing a deeply entrenched legend about Denmark during World War II that have masked a more nuanced wartime experience - both its bravery and its blemishes.

== Selected filmography ==
=== As consultant or writer ===
- Wu-Tang Clan: Of Mics & Men, (Director Sascha Jenkins) Story Consultant, 4 part series, Showtime, 2019
- Strike Anywhere Films - (founded by Barry Jenkins) feature-length documentary, Writer, 2018
- Something Ventured - Consulting Producer, 85 minutes, PBS (Directors Dayna Goldfine & Dan Geller), 2011.
- Ripe for Change - Consulting Writer, one hour, PBS (Director Emiko Omori), 2005.
- The Cockettes- 100-minutes, PBS (Directors David Weissman and Bill Weber), 2002.

=== As executive producer ===
- Pool Stories, work in progress (Director Vicky Funari
- Near Normal Man 28 minutes, 2017 (Director Charlene Stern)
- Last Day of Freedom, animated documentary/transmedia project. KQED Truly California, 32 minutes, 2015 (Directors Dee Hibbert-Jones and Nomi Talisman). Academy Award nominated
- Strong! PBS, ITVS, one hour, 2012. (Director Julie Wyman)
- Passion & Power, 74 minutes, 2007. (Directors Emiko Omori and Wendy Slick)
- Hope Along the Wind (Director Eric Slade) PBS, ITVS
- The Key of G PBS, ITVS, one hour, 2007. (Director Robert Arnold)
- Maquilapolis: City of Factories PBS, ITVS, one hour, 2006. (Directors Vicky Funari and Sergio dela Torre)
- First Person Plural PBS, POV and ITVS, one hour, 2000. (Director Deann Borshay)

=== As producer ===
- Forgotten Fires PBS, ITVS, one hour, 1998. (with Michael Chandler)
- Roam Sweet Home PBS, ITVS, one hour, 1996. (with Ellen Spiro)
- Color Adjustment PBS, POV, 90 minutes, PBS, POV series, 90-minutes, 1992 (with Marlon Riggs)
- Routes of Exile: A Moroccan Jewish Odyssey 1982 (with Gene Rosow & Howard Dratch)

=== As director/producer ===
- No Straight Lines: The Rise of Queer Comics (world premiere Tribeca Festival 2021)
- Families Are Forever Commissioned by the Family Acceptance Project, 21 minutes, 2013
  - Audience Award, LA Outfest; Best Documentary Short, Sebastopol Documentary Film Festival
- Always My Son Commissioned by the Family Acceptance Project, 16 minutes, 2011
- Profiles of Change Commissioned by Rubicon Programs, 8 minutes, 2011
- The Meaning of Food PBS, 3 x 60 minute series, 2005 (also Series Producer)
- My Body's My Business 16 minutes, 1992.
- Out For The Count Commissioned by Lavender Message Project, 14 minutes, 1992.
- Ein Stehaufmannchen Commissioned by Shana Films, 40 minutes, 1991.

== Selected awards ==
- George Foster Peabody Award
- Grand Jury Prize, Best Feature-Length Documentary, OutFest Film Festival, Los Angeles, 2021.
- Eureka Fellowship, The Fleishhacker Foundation
- National Emmy Award Nomination for Outstanding Individual Research
- Outstanding Documentary Award, International Documentary Association
- Erik Barnouw Award, Organization of American Historians
- National Owl Award, AARP
- Prized Pieces, National Black Programmers Association
- Crystal Heart Award, Heartland Film Festival=

== Additional Experience ==
=== As member of the board of directors ===
- San Francisco Jewish Film Festival (the world's first)
- Frameline
- Film Arts Foundation
- AIVF (Association of Independent Video & Filmmakers)
- Encampment for Citizenship, founded by Eleanor Roosevelt
- Signifyin' Works, founded by Marlon T. Riggs

=== As mentor ===
- CAAM (Center for Asian American Media) James T. Yee Mentorship Award (Kleiman served as an inaugural mentor)
