= POV (TV series) =

American public television series

- Genre: Documentary
- Created by: Marc N. Weiss
- Developed by: Marc N. Weiss
- Country of origin: United States
- Original language: English
- No. of seasons: 37
- No. of episodes: 400+ (list of episodes)

Production
- Running time: 60–90 minutes
- Production companies: American Documentary, Inc.

Original release
- Network: PBS
- Release: July 5, 1988 – present

POV (also written P.O.V.) is a Public Broadcasting Service (PBS) public television series which features independent nonfiction films. POV is an initialism for point of view.

PBS presents 14–16 POV programs each year, and the series has premiered over 400 films to U.S. television audiences since 1988. POV's films have a strong first-person, social-issue focus. Many established directors, including Michael Moore, Jonathan Demme, Terry Zwigoff, Errol Morris, Albert and David Maysles, Michael Apted, Frederick Wiseman, Marlon Riggs, Ross McElwee, Liu Bing, and Laura Poitras have had work screened as part of the POV series.

The series has garnered both critical and industry acclaim over its 30+ years on television. POV films have won every major film and broadcasting award including 45 Emmys, 26 George Foster Peabody Awards, 15 duPont-Columbia Awards, three Academy Awards, three George Polk Documentary Film Awards and the Prix Italia. POV and America ReFramed are projects of the independent non-profit, American Documentary, Inc.

== Reception ==
Richard Roeper of Chicago Sun-Times wrote for the episode, 'And She Could Be Next', "Powerful and absolutely vital."

== See also ==
- Independent Lens (PBS series)
