= Liz Heller =

American producer and entrepreneur

- Born: Los Angeles, California
- Education: University of California, Los Angeles
- Occupations: Producer, entrepreneur
- Board member of: The Liberty Hill Foundation
- Spouse: John Bard Manulis
- Parent(s): Billie Heller, Seymour Heller

Elizabeth Heller is an American producer and entrepreneur. Described by USA Today as the "'godmother' of the women's cyber movement in Hollywood," Heller is noted for her early advocacy of the internet in the entertainment industry.

== Early life and education ==
Heller was born in Los Angeles and raised in Beverly Hills, California, the daughter of Seymour Heller, a personal manager, and Billie Heller, a women's rights activist. She attended the University of California, Los Angeles.

== Career ==
Heller began her career as an assistant at Epic Records. In 1983, she was hired by MCA Records; as an artist development executive, Heller commissioned more than 500 music videos for artists including Bobby Brown, Belinda Carlisle, and Tom Petty. She remained at MCA until 1990, when she was appointed president of Island Visual Arts. In 1994, Heller began working at Capitol Records, where she served as vice president of new media, and gained attention for developing early strategic alliances between the label and Microsoft, Macromedia, Liquid Audio and Apple, among other technology companies. Additionally, Heller acted as an executive producer on several of the label's soundtrack releases. She was named executive vice president of Capitol in 1996.

While at Capitol, Heller was reunited with music video director Scott Kalvert, who she had worked with at Island Visual Arts. Kalvert, who grew up in New York, had spent more than a decade unsuccessfully "making the studio rounds," trying to get Jim Carroll's autobiography, The Basketball Diaries, made into a film. Excited by the idea, Heller took the project to her former boss, Chris Blackwell, who agreed to invest in the film. Heller produced The Basketball Diaries, which starred Leonardo DiCaprio, released by Palm Pictures in 1995.

Heller founded Buzztone, a marketing company, in 2000. Focused on brand building, cause marketing, social media, and ecommerce strategies, Buzztone's clients have included Microsoft, Paramount Pictures, Electronic Arts, Product(RED), Sony Pictures, and Coca-Cola. She has been a strategic partnership and initiative adviser for TOMS since 2008.

From 2000 through 2002, Heller served as the managing director of Prime Ventures, an investment firm founded by Richard Rosenblatt. In 2010, she founded Vwalls, a social publishing platform, with her husband, John Bard Manulis.

Heller is on the board of directors for uWink and the advisory board for Boopsie. She is a frequent speaker at conferences, events, and seminars worldwide.

Heller is a mentor for X Media Lab, a digital media think tank, and hosts regular networking events for women in Los Angeles. She is a member of the Los Angeles Sustainable Business Council, and is active in the Liberty Hill Foundation. Heller and Manulis were presented with the Liberty Hill Founder's Award in 2010.

== Personal ==
Heller lives with her husband John Bard Manulis in Los Angeles.

== Honors and distinctions ==
- Founders Award, Liberty Hill Foundation, 2010
- Best in the Business, NARIP, 2009
- Rising Star, National Association of Women Business Owners, 2004
- Executive director, Grammy Awards host committee, 1993
- Cable Ace Award nomination, New Orleans Live, 1992

== Filmography/Discography ==
Year	Album	Artist	Credit
2012	Live!	Toots & the Maytals	Executive producer (DVD)
2005	One Fair Summer Evening...Plus!	Nanci Griffith	Executive producer (DVD)
1999	Blast from the Past (film)	Various Artists	Executive producer (soundtrack)
1999	Lost & Found	Various Artists	Executive producer (soundtrack)
1999	Never Been Kissed	Various Artists	Producer (soundtrack)
1999	Teaching Mrs. Tingle	Various Artists	Executive producer (soundtrack)
1998	Boogie Nights, Vol. 2	Various Artists	Executive producer (soundtrack)
1998	Hope Floats (Original Soundtrack)	Dave Grusin	Music supervisor
1998	There's Something About Mary	Various Artists	Music supervisor
1997	Good Will Hunting	Various Artists	Executive producer (soundtrack)
1997	Scream 2	Various Artists	Producer (soundtrack)
1997	Making a Noise: A Native American Musical Journey		Executive producer (TV special)
1996	Nico	Blind Melon	Executive producer
1996	Romeo + Juliet	Various Artists	Executive producer (soundtrack)
1996	Bonnie Raitt: Road Tested	Bonnie Raitt	Executive producer (TV special)
1995	The Basketball Diaries		Producer (film)
1993	Let the Good Times Roll	Various artists	Executive producer (TV series)
1993	Rhythms of the World	Various artists	Executive producer (TV special)
1992	New Orleans Live!	Various artists	Executive producer (TV series)
1991	Through Time P.O.V.	Anthrax	Executive producer (long form video)
1986	Live by the Bay	Jimmy Buffett	Executive producer (Live concert video)
