= Newton Thomas Sigel =

American cinematographer

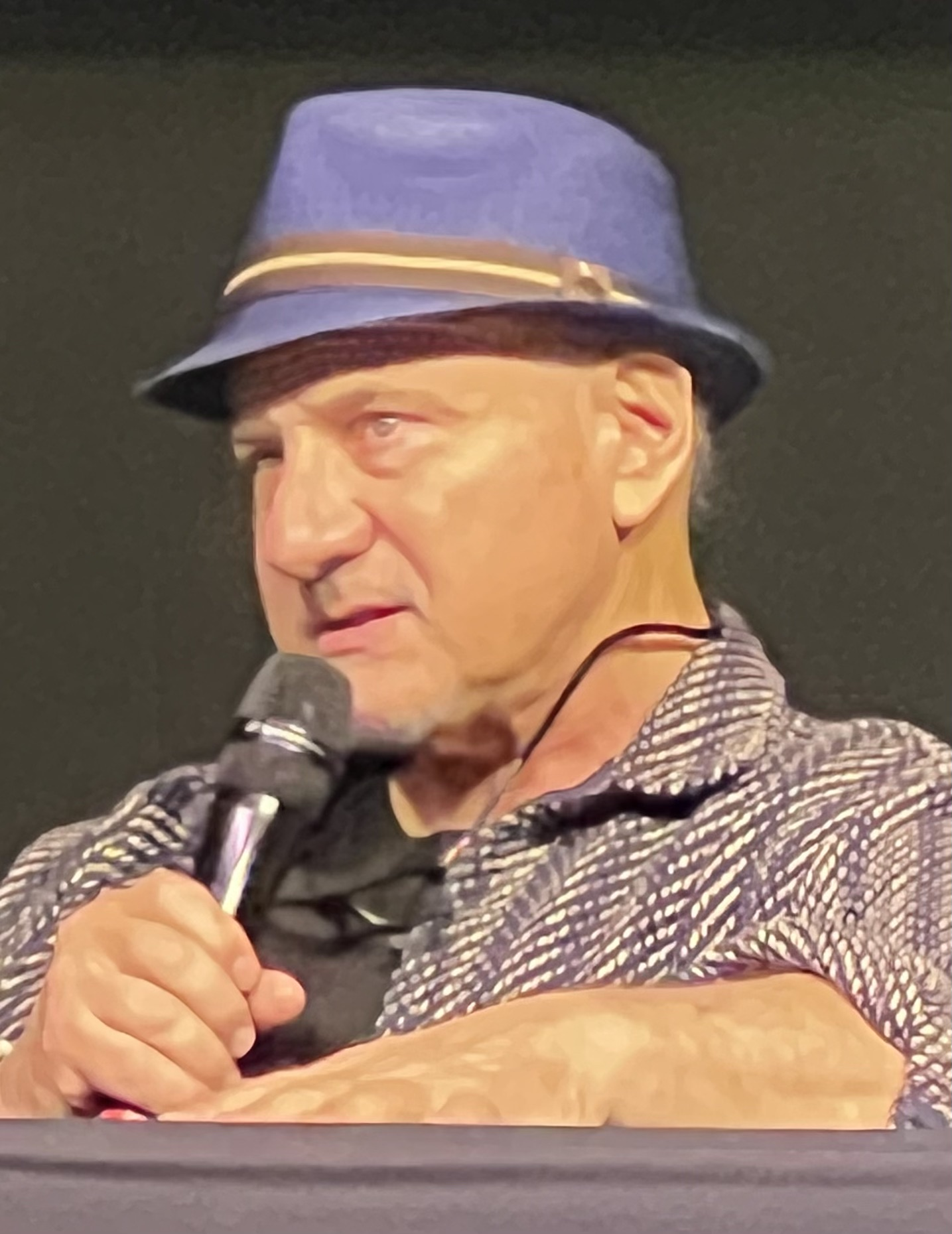
- Sigel in 2023
- Born: August 29, 1955 (age 71); Detroit, Michigan, U.S.
- Other name: Tom Sigel
- Years active: 1980–present
- Spouse: Lisa Chang

Newton Thomas Sigel (born August 29, 1955), ASC is an American cinematographer, best known for his collaboration with director Bryan Singer.

== Early life ==
Sigel was born in Detroit, Michigan, and studied painting in New York City, becoming an artist-in-residence at the Whitney Museum of American Art.

== Career ==
He began his career working with experimental filmmaker Kenneth Anger as a camera operator.

Becoming a documentary filmmaker, he shot a number of projects, including El Salvador: Another Vietnam, which was nominated for an Academy Award for Best Documentary Feature. His photography caught the attention of DP Haskell Wexler, and the two spent several years developing what would become the 1985 film Latino, his first feature film as director of photography.

Sigel worked mostly on television films and as a second unit DP throughout the 1980s. He regularly served under Robert Richardson on films like Platoon and The Doors.

Starting with The Usual Suspects in 1995, Sigel become the regular cinematographer of director Bryan Singer until 2018.

== Personal life ==
Sigel is Jewish and married to Lisa Chang.

His father, Irving Sigel, was a psychologist who worked for the Educational Testing Service. His mother, Roberta Sigel, was a professor at Rutgers who studied gender and politics.

== Filmography ==
=== Cinematographer ===
==== Film ====
Year	Title	Director	Notes
1985	Latino	Haskell Wexler	
1989	Rude Awakening	David Greenwalt; Aaron Russo	
1991	Salmonberries	Percy Adlon	
1992	Crossing the Bridge	Mike Binder	
1992	Into the West	Mike Newell	
1993	Indian Summer	Mike Binder	
1993	Money for Nothing	Ramón Menéndez	
1994	Blankman	Mike Binder	
1995	The Usual Suspects	Bryan Singer	
1996	Foxfire	Annette Haywood-Carter	
1996	The Trigger Effect	David Koepp	
1996	Blood and Wine	Bob Rafelson	
1998	Fallen	Gregory Hoblit	
1998	Apt Pupil	Bryan Singer	
1999	Brokedown Palace	Jonathan Kaplan	
1999	Three Kings	David O. Russell	
2000	X-Men	Bryan Singer	
2002	Confessions of a Dangerous Mind	George Clooney	
2003	X2	Bryan Singer	
2005	The Brothers Grimm	Terry Gilliam	
2005	The Big Empty	Himself; Lisa Chang	Short film
2006	Superman Returns	Bryan Singer	
2007	Towelhead	Alan Ball	
2008	Leatherheads	George Clooney	
2008	Valkyrie	Bryan Singer	
2010	Leap Year	Anand Tucker	
2010	Frankie & Alice	Geoffrey Sax	
2010	The Conspirator	Robert Redford	
2011	Drive	Nicolas Winding Refn	
2013	Jack the Giant Slayer	Bryan Singer	
2014	Seventh Son	Sergei Bodrov	
2014	X-Men: Days of Future Past	Bryan Singer	
2016	Crouching Tiger, Hidden Dragon: Sword of Destiny	Yuen Woo-ping	
2016	X-Men: Apocalypse	Bryan Singer	
2017	Marshall	Reginald Hudlin	
2018	Bohemian Rhapsody	Bryan Singer	
2020	Extraction	Sam Hargrave	
2020	Da 5 Bloods	Spike Lee	
2021	Cherry	Anthony and Joe Russo	
2022	Dog	Channing Tatum; Reid Carolin	
2023	Candy Cane Lane	Reginald Hudlin	
2026	Avengers: Doomsday †	Anthony and Joe Russo	Post-production

Key
†	Denotes films that have not yet been released

==== Television ====
TV movies

Year	Title	Director	Notes
1987	Home Fires	Michael Toshiyuki Uno	With Rick F. Gunter
1987	Tales from the Hollywood Hills: Pat Hobby Teamed with Genius	Rob Thompson	
1987	Tales from the Hollywood Hills: A Table at Ciro's	Leon Ichaso	
1988	Perfect People	Bruce Seth Green	
1989	Roe vs. Wade	Gregory Hoblit	
1990	Rock Hudson	John Nicolella	
1990	Challenger	Glenn Jordan	
1990	Turner & Hooch	Donald Petrie	TV pilot
1990	Red Hot + Blue: A Tribute to Cole Porter	Percy Adlon	Segment "So In Love"
1990	A Promise to Keep	Rod Holcomb	
1991	Murder in High Places	John Byrum	
1993	Daybreak	Stephen Tolkin	
1994	A Time to Heal	Michael Toshiyuki Uno	

TV series

Year	Title	Director	Notes
1987	Great Performances	Paul Bogart	Episode "Tales from the Hollywood Hills: Natica Jackson"
1988	The Wonder Years	Steve Miner; Carol Black; Neal Marlens; Jeffrey D. Brown	3 episodes
1999	Cop Rock	Gregory Hoblit	Episode "Pilot"
2004	House	Bryan Singer	Episode "Pilot"
2015	Battle Creek	Bryan Singer	Episode "The Battle Creek Way"
2017	The Gifted	Bryan Singer	Episode "eXposed"
2023-2026	Citadel	Himself; Jessica Yu; Joe Russo; Greg Yaitanes	13 episodes

=== Director ===
Documentary film

Year	Title	Notes
1981	Resurgence: The Movement for Equality vs. the Ku Klux Klan	Co-directed with Pamela Yates
1983	When the Mountains Tremble	Co-directed with Pamela Yates

TV movie

- Point of Origin (2001)

TV series

Year	Title	Notes
2004-2006	House	Episodes "Maternity" and "Lines in the Sand"
2023	Citadel	6 episodes (Co-directed 2 episodes with Jessica Yu)

== Awards and nominations ==
Year	Title	Awards/Nominations
1983	When the Mountains Tremble	Sundance Special Jury Award for Best Documentary
1995	The Usual Suspects	Nominated- Independent Spirit Award for Best Cinematography
2011	Drive	Nominated- Critics' Choice Movie Award for Best Cinematography; Nominated- Chicago Film Critics Association Award for Best Cinematography; Nominated- Georgia Film Critics Association Award for Best Cinematography; Nominated- Gold Derby Award for Best Cinematography; Nominated- Houston Film Critics Society Award for Best Cinematography; Nominated- IndieWire Critics Poll Award for Best Cinematography; Nominated- San Diego Film Critics Society Award for Best Cinematography; Nominated- Satellite Award for Best Cinematography; Nominated- St. Louis Film Critics Association Award for Best Cinematography
2014	X-Men: Days of Future Past	Visual Effects Society Award for Outstanding Virtual Cinematography
2018	Bohemian Rhapsody	Nominated- BAFTA Award for Best Cinematography
2020	Da 5 Bloods	Nominated- Critics' Choice Movie Award for Best Cinematography
2021	Cherry	Nominated- ASC Award for Outstanding Achievement in Cinematography
