= The Reckoning: The Battle for the International Criminal Court =

- Directed by: Pamela Yates
- Produced by: Paco de onis
- Cinematography: Melle van Essen
- Edited by: Peter Kinoy, Dara Kell
- Music by: Roger C. Miller
- Production company: Skylight Pictures
- Distributed by: New Day Films
- Release date: 2009
- Running time: 96 minutes
- Country: United States

The Reckoning: The Battle for the International Criminal Court is a 2009 documentary film about the International Criminal Court produced by Skylight Pictures and directed by Pamela Yates. It was nominated for the Grand Jury Prize at the Sundance Film Festival and won Best Documentary at the Politics on Film Festival.

The film aired on POV on July 14, 2009.
