= 500 Years =

- Directed by: Pamela Yates
- Produced by: Paco de Onis with Beatriz Gallardo Shaul and Raul Estuardo Socon Canel
- Cinematography: Melle van Essen and Rene Soza
- Edited by: Peter Kinoy
- Music by: Roger C. Miller
- Production company: Skylight
- Distributed by: Paladin
- Release date: January 24, 2017
- Running time: 106 minutes
- Country: United States
- Language: Spanish

500 Years: Life in Resistance is a 2017 American documentary film directed by Pamela Yates about the trial of Guatemalan dictator Efraín Ríos Montt for genocide against the country's indigenous Maya population in the 1980s and the popular uprising that followed the trial, which led to the toppling of President Otto Perez Molina.

The film was screened at the Sundance and London Human Rights Watch Film Festivals, and Seattle International Film Festival. It is the third film in a three film trilogy which also includes When the Mountains Tremble and Granito: How to Nail a Dictator. Its soundtrack features the music of the indigenous Guatemalan musician Sara Curruchich.

Andrea Ixchíu, a Maya-K’iche’ human rights activist, land defender and journalist, is featured in the film's second half.
