= The Basketball Diaries =

The Basketball Diaries may refer to:

- The Basketball Diaries (book), a 1978 memoir by Jim Carroll
- The Basketball Diaries (film), a 1995 American biographical film, based on the memoir
- Basketball Diaries (D:TNG episode), an episode of Degrassi: The Next Generation
