= Manulis (surname) =

Manulis is a surname. Notable people with the surname include:

- John Bard Manulis (born 1956), American film director
- Martin Manulis (1915–2007), American film producer
