= Catholic Boy =

Studio album by The Jim Carroll Band
- Released: January 3, 1980
- Recorded: June – August 1979
- Genres: Punk rock; new wave; garage rock
- Length: 38:26
- Label: Atco
- Producers: Earl McGrath, Bob Clearmountain

The Jim Carroll Band chronology
Catholic Boy (1980)	Dry Dreams (1982)

Catholic Boy is the debut album released on January 3, 1980, by The Jim Carroll Band, led by Jim Carroll, who is notable for publishing the 1978 memoir The Basketball Diaries, and poetry collections including Living at the Movies. They were able to secure a recording contract with Atlantic Records with the support of the Rolling Stones' Keith Richards. The album included the group's most well-known song, "People Who Died", which is a catalogue of young people Carroll knew growing up who met tragic ends. The album cover shows Carroll standing with his parents, photographed by Annie Leibovitz, outside their apartment block on the corner of Cumming Street and Seaman Avenue in Manhattan, New York City.

== Origin ==
In 1978, already-lauded poet Jim Carroll was traveling with his friend and fellow poet Patti Smith and her rock band, the Patti Smith Group as they toured. One night in San Diego he was encouraged by Smith to perform his poetry in front of her band as they played because the opening band was a no-show. Inspired by the experience, he soon formed his own band, consisting of the San Francisco Bay Area band Amsterdam, soon to be re-christened The Jim Carroll Band. Keith Richards, guitarist for the Rolling Stones, was impressed by their music and helped them land a recording contract with Atlantic Records.

== Music ==
Catholic Boy, the band's first album, was released to great critical praise in 1980. Regarding Carroll's singing style, Lenny Kaye, Patti Smith's guitar player said: "There was no gap between the way he recited poetry and how he sang it". Critic Stephen Holden of The New York Times wrote that Carroll was "not so much a singer as an incantatory rock-and-roll poet". In Newsweek, Barbara Graustark stated "Not since Lou Reed wrote 'Walk on the Wild Side' has a rock singer so vividly evoked the casual brutality of New York City". The album has been described as "a landmark punk record" and has been hailed as "the last great punk album".

== Songs ==
"Crow" was written about Patti Smith's falling offstage and breaking vertebrae in her neck, resulting in the need for 22 stitches, at a show in Tampa, Florida, in 1976. She later claimed that God had pushed her. Perennial favorite "People Who Died" appeared on the Billboard Top Tracks chart.

== Critical reception ==
Professional ratings
Review scores
Source	Rating
AllMusic	4.5/5 stars
Christgau's Record Guide	B+
Pitchfork	8.8/10
Rolling Stone	3/5 stars
The Rolling Stone Album Guide	4/5 stars

Billboard said of Catholic Boy: "Carroll declaims more than he sings; his songs coming in a torrent of words and images. The sensibilities here are similar to Lou Reed and Iggy Pop, but former Rolling Stones label chief Earl McGrath keeps the production well within the mainstream."

Mark Deming of AllMusic wrote, "Jim Carroll is one of the very few authors who convincingly brought his work from the printed word to the rock & roll stage, growing into a passionate and commanding rock singer as well as a tough, intelligent songwriter, and his first album, Catholic Boy, best captures his strengths ... [He] brings his songs across with a passion and dramatic intensity that more than compensates for his narrow range, and the lean, guitar-led attack of his band makes a good backdrop for these songs. On Catholic Boy, Carroll doesn't come off as a poet slumming in pop music, but like a born rock & roller baring his soul".

In The Guardian, Alastair Harper opined, "In my mind, Carroll will always be the creator of one of the most underrated albums of all time. 1980's Catholic Boy seems to be New York's missing musical link between drugged-out beat-clown acts such as the Holy Modal Rounders and the darker sound of Richard Hell. It has 60s style Spector-ish songs like 'Day and Night', lyrics about girls staying in bed to read Raymond Chandler, synthy love songs to the city and a lot of Raw Power-style garage rock. Carroll's sound walked the line between the coming precision of new wave and the scruffiness of 1975."

== Cover versions ==
"People Who Died" has been covered multiple times: John Cale on the album Antártida (1995), Drive-By Truckers on the live album Alabama Ass Whuppin' (2000), Lordz of Brooklyn on the album The Brooklyn Way (2006), Paradime on his Spill At Will album (2007), The Wildhearts on the album ¡Chutzpah! Jnr. (2009), Fang on the album Here Come The Cops (2012), and Willie Nile on the album American Ride (2013). In 2014, Gwar appended a version of "People Who Died" onto their cover of the Pet Shop Boys song "West End Girls" for The A.V. Club's Undercover series, with lyrics paying tribute to their recently deceased singer, Oderus Urungus (a.k.a. Dave Brockie). A cover of the song by the band Against Me! was included on the 2018 compilation album Songs That Saved My Life. In 2019, Hollywood Vampires recorded a version on their second album, Rise.

"Catholic Boy" was re-recorded by Jim Carroll with Pearl Jam and Chris Friel as backing band for the soundtrack of the 1995 film The Basketball Diaries. ("People Who Died" was included on the soundtrack in its original iteration.)

== Track listing ==
1. "Wicked Gravity" (Jim Carroll) – 4:56
2. "Three Sisters" (Carroll, Terrell Winn) – 3:19
3. "Day and Night" (Carroll, Allen Lanier) – 2:22
4. "Nothing Is True" (Carroll, Brian Linsley) – 3:29
5. "People Who Died" (Carroll, Brian Linsley, Stephen Linsley, Terrell Winn, Wayne Woods) – 4:59
6. "City Drops into the Night" (Carroll, Stephen Linsley, Brian Linsley) – 7:23
7. "Crow" (Carroll, Terrell Winn) – 3:02
8. "It's Too Late" (Carroll, Wayne Woods) – 3:04
9. "I Want the Angel" (Carroll, Brian Linsley) – 2:49
10. "Catholic Boy" (Carroll) – 3:03

Bolinas Demos

1. "Tension"
2. "Cruelty"
3. "Nothing Is True"
4. "Lorraine"
5. "Crow"
6. "Book of Nods (Dead Heat)"

Demos recorded in 1978, created by Stephen Linsley and released November 25, 2022 on Fat Possum Records

== Personnel ==
Credits are adapted from the album's liner notes.

Jim Carroll Band

- Jim Carroll – vocals
- Brian Linsley – guitar, backing vocals on "People Who Died"
- Steve Linsley – bass, backing vocals on "People Who Died"
- Terrell Winn – guitar, backing vocals on "People Who Died"
- Wayne Woods – drums, backing vocals on "People Who Died"

Additional musicians

- Allen Lanier – keyboards on "Day and Night" and "I Want the Angel"
- Bobby Keys – saxophone on "City Drops into the Night"
- Amy Kanter – additional vocals on "Day and Night"
- Hilary – backing vocals on "People Who Died"
- Janet – backing vocals on "People Who Died"
- Neon – backing vocals on "People Who Died"
- Sally – backing vocals on "People Who Died"

Technical

- Earl McGrath – production, art direction
- Bob Clearmountain – engineering, co-production
- Jason Corsaro – engineering (assistant)
- Bob Ludwig – mastering
- Jeffrey Norman – engineering (assistant)
- Michael Halsband – back cover photography
- Annie Leibovitz – art direction, front cover photography
- Sandi Young – art direction

== Charts ==
Chart (1980–81)	Peak position
New Zealand Albums (RMNZ)	50
US Billboard 200	73
