= Andrea Ixchíu =

Guatemalan human rights activist (born 1987)

- Born: Andrea Isabel Ixchíu Hernández; 11 September 1987 (age 38); Totonicapán, Guatemala
- Education: Universidad de San Carlos de Guatemala, 2016
- Occupations: Human rights activist; land defender; journalist; filmmaker

Andrea Isabel Ixchíu Hernández (born 11 September 1987) is a Maya-K’iche’ and Guatemalan human rights activist, land defender, journalist and filmmaker. In 2012, Ixchíu was the first women to be elected the President of the Board of Natural Resources of the 48 Cantones of Totonicapán.

== Early life and education ==
Ixchíu was born 11 September 1987 in Totonicapán to Pedro Ixchíu, a lawyer, and Auri Hernández, a social worker. The eldest of three siblings Ixchíu is the older sister of Lucia Ixchíu, a filmmaker, human rights activist, and journalist, and Gabriela Ixchíu, an activist.

Initially studying biology, Ixchíu later studied law at the Universidad de San Carlos de Guatemala and graduated in 2016.

== Career ==
In November 2012, Ixchíu became the first female President of the Board of Natural Resources of the 48 Cantones of Totonicapán, the Kʼicheʼ authority for the Totonicapán Department.

On 16 February 2019, Ixchíu organised and participated in the "Artists in Action against corruption and impunity" (Note: Spanish: Artistas en acción contra la corrupción y la impunidad) march in Guatemala City. During the march Ixchíu, her sister Lucia and José Hernández, a member of the Citizens' Assembly, were verbally and physically assaulted by Leonel Quiñonez, a military officer. On 22 September 2020, Ixchíu, her sisters and her brother-in-law the journalist Carlos Cano were beaten and attacked with machetes whilst documenting illegal loggers in Totonicapán.

In 2021, Ixchíu attended the United Nations Climate Change Conference but was not allowed to fully participate in the proceedings.

Since 2022 Ixchíu has lived in exile in Mexico.

== Filmography ==
Year	Title	Role	Notes	Ref.
2017	500 Years	Self	Directed by Pamela Yates	
2019	Cho Ukayib’al (Note: K'iche': To Look Deeply)	Director	Short film	
