= Sara Curruchich =

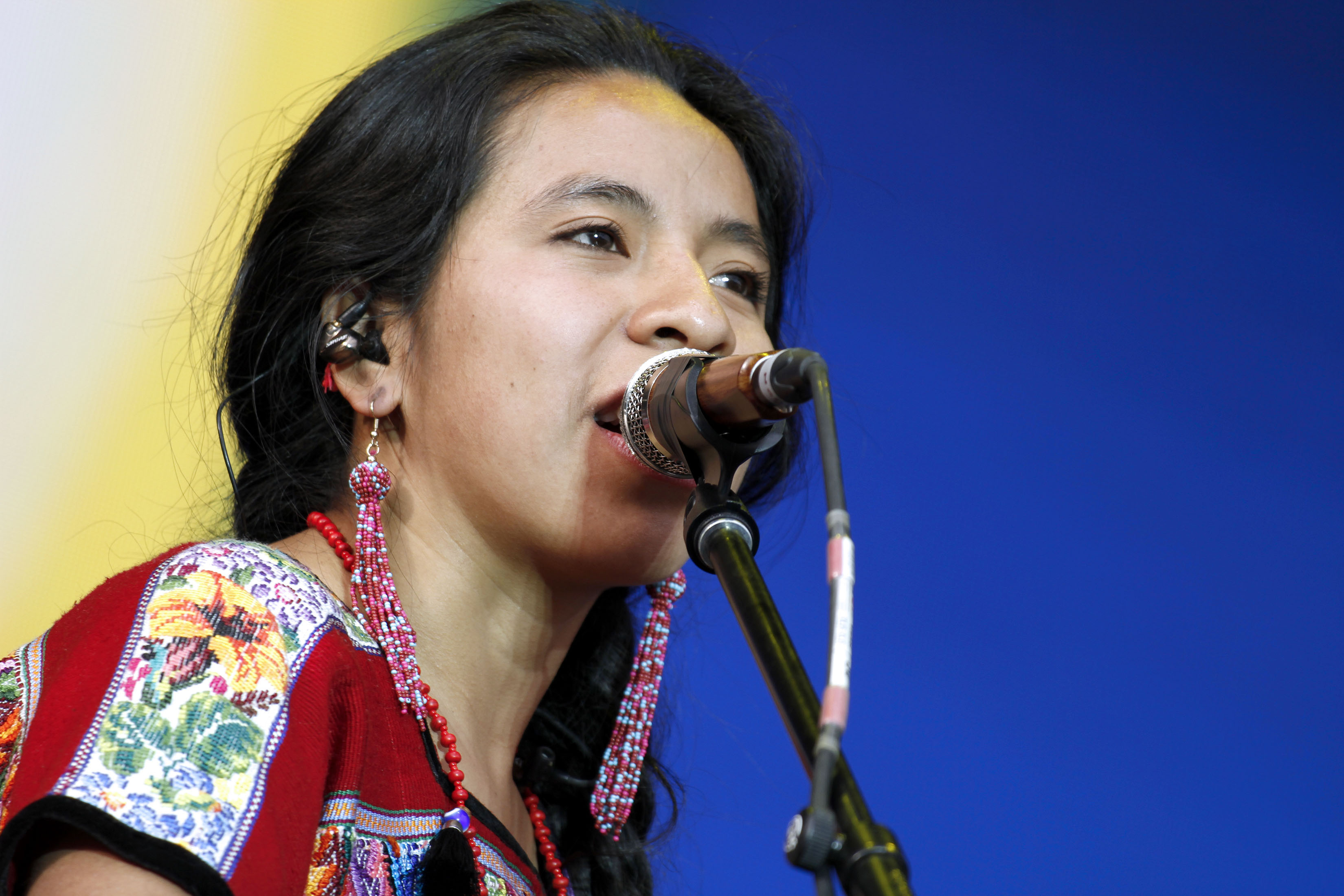
- Sara Curruchich performs in Mexico City in March 2020.

Background information
- Born: 25 July 1993 (age 33); San Juan Comalapa, Guatemala
- Occupations: Songwriter, political activist
- Instruments: Vocals, guitar, marimba, harmonica
- Years active: 2012–present
- Labels: Mamita Records, YEARNING

Sara Curruchich Cúmez (born 25 July 1993) is a Kaqchikel singer-songwriter from Guatemala. She sings in both Spanish and the Kaqchikel language, and is one of the first musicians to use the latter in popular music. She became well known in her country with her 2015 song "Ch'uti'xtän" ("Girl"). Since then, she has released two albums and multiple singles. Curruchich is also an activist in defense of women's and indigenous people's rights. For her work as an activist, she has won the MIAW Transformer Award at the 2021 MTV Millennial Awards, and been selected for the Ford Fellowship Foundation Global Fellowship Program.

== Early life ==
Curruchich was born on 25 July 1993 in San Juan Comalapa, a town in Guatemala's Chimaltenango department. She is Kaqchikel maya and speak the Kaqchikel language natively. She began singing and playing guitar with her family at a young age. As a child, she would often accompany her mother, a housekeeper, to her job and would listen to her as she sang while washing clothes. This was her earliest exposure to music, and the catalyst in her wanting to be a singer.

When she was nine years old her father died, and in her grief, she stopped making music for several years. Her mother used the money she made while working to put her daughter through school at the Jesús María Alvarado School for Music Teachers, where she studied music education. Many of the songs that she wrote during her formative years in music school were written in the Kaqchikel language, and they were inspired by her experiences as an indigenous woman, her connections to her ancestors, and her love of nature, themes that would carry over into her later work.

== Music career ==
In 2012 she joined a local all-women marimba group called Teclas en Armonía, as well as another local group. Her first public performance was that same year, through an invitation from a German orchestra.

She also began writing her own songs, which touch on such subjects as respect for nature and the memories of the Maya peoples. Her songs mix Spanish with the Kaqchikel language, which Curruchich describes as a way of reclaiming her mother tongue. She became particularly well known in Guatemala for the ballad "Ch'uti'xtän" ("Girl"), which gained hundreds of thousands of views on social media streaming platforms in 2015. That year, she was named a "Breakout Artist" by the Dante Alighieri Foundation.

In 2016 she released her second single, "Resistir" ("Resist"), which was written in late 2014 and was dedicated to those who fight against oppression and violence. Later that year she went on her first international tour, which included concerts in Madrid, Barcelona, Biarritz, Paris and Berlin. In the United States, Curruchich performed in Austin, Texas and at Bizarre Bushwick in Brooklyn and the United Nations headquarters in New York, marking the session of the Permanent Forum on Indigenous Issues.

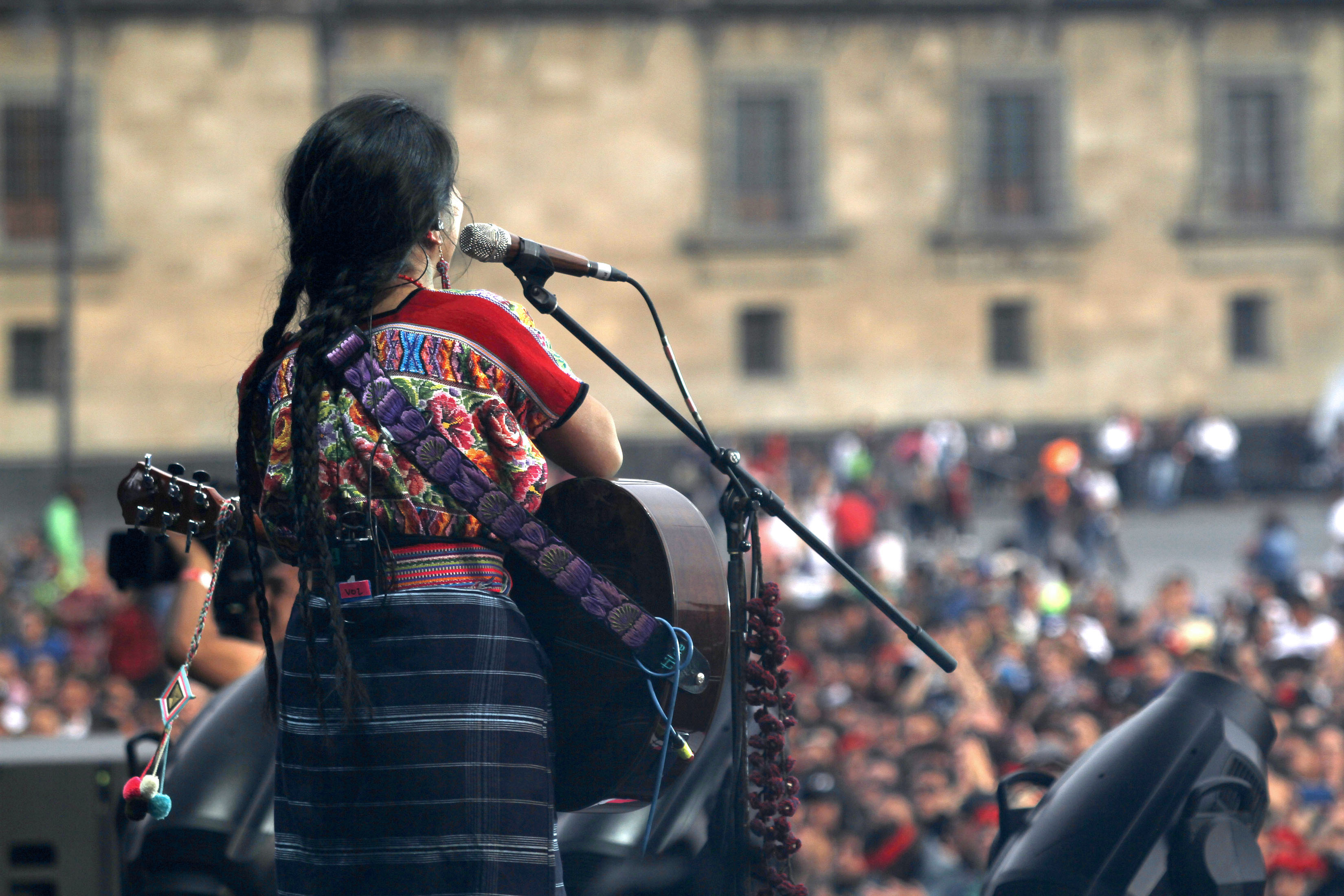
Sara Curruchich onstage in 2020.

The following year she released the song "Ralk’wal Ulew" ("Children of the Earth"), with a video by the documentarian Pamela Yates, whom Curruchich had met in New York. The song was included in Yates' film 500 Years, and it shared the film's aim of telling the story of the uprising against Guatemalan President Otto Pérez Molina.

In 2017 she released the single "Ser del Viento", which featured the Guatemalan rapper Kontra. The music video made for the song, directed by Daniel Garcia, shows the differences between life in urban and rural communities in Guatemala. Also in 2017, Curruchich embarked on the Raíz tour throughout Guatemala. The goal of the tour was bring music to remote indigenous communities. A short documentary about the tour, Desde Nuestro Muxu’x, directed by Juan Pablo Rojas, was released in 2019. It was an official selection at the Humano Film Festival and won an award at the Best Shorts Competition in the United States.

On 3 June 2017 Curruchich performed alongside the Dresden Symphony Orchestra in Tijuana, Mexico, at a protest against the construction of U.S. president Donald Trump's border wall between Mexico and the United States. The concert, which was held directly in front of the wall, also featured appearances from Mexican singer-songwriter Ceci Bastida and the band Tijuana No!.

Curruchich has also shared the stage with the singer-songwriter Fernando López and the Guatemalan Mayan rock group Sobrevivencia, which sings in the Mam language.

Her debut album, Somos (We Are), was released in 2019. According to Curruchich, the album blends "traditional Guatemalan music and contemporary instruments and sounds". Lyrically, the album focuses on the experience of being a woman, the remembrance of ancestors, the relationship between human beings and the natural world, the atrocities of war, and the power of love. The same year, she embarked on the Somos tour throughout Guatemala.

In 2020 she launched a project to compile music by indigenous women. She had originally intended to organize a music festival featuring Indigenous women musicians from Latin America but this plan was disrupted by the COVID-19 pandemic. The compilation became available in September on Spotify.

Currichich participated in an acoustic online benefit concert for the victims of Hurricane Eta in Guatemala on 15 November 2020. Also appearing as part of the concert were Ana Tijoux, Rozalén, Andrea Echeverri, Gaby Moreno, Sol Pereyra, Amparo Sánchez, Rebecca Lane, and Carmen María Vega.

In August 2021 she collaborated with Lila Downs on the song "Pueblos." The song was released to coincide with the International Day of the World's Indigenous Peoples. Thematically, the song celebrated native peoples and their journey for equality and freedom. On 22 October 2021, Curruchich released her second studio album, Mujer Indígena. It features collaborations with Spanish singer-songwriters Muerdo and Amparo Sanchez.

== Activism ==
Curruchich has stated that her biggest objective as a musician is to "share with girls and boys that we as Indigenous peoples exist" and that the history of indigenous peoples in Latin America does not revolve completely around the presence of Spanish colonists.

An adamant supporter of equal rights for women, especially indigenous women, Curruchich writes many songs about the experience of being discriminated against and mistreated for being a Kaqchikel woman. Outside of music, she is a collaborator with UN Women Guatemala, serving as an ambassador for their HeForShe movement, and has spoken out on violence against women. Her time as an ambassador saw her visiting remote areas of Guatemala and performing for the people that live there.

Curruchich was the first person to win the MIAW Transformer Award, at the 2021 MTV Millennial Awards in Mexico City. She was recognized for her fight for Indigenous women's equality.

In interviews, Curruchich has denounced the occupation of land by multinational corporations, as well as the attacks on and killings of indigenous leaders who work to resist it.

In October 2021 The Ford Foundation named Curruchich as one of the 2021 selections for their Global Fellowship Program, which aims to aid emerging leaders in their fight for equality.

== Discography ==
=== Albums ===
- Somos (2019)
- Mujer Indígena (2021)

=== Singles ===
- "Ch'uti'xtän" (2015)
- "Resistir" (2016)
- "Ralk’wal Ulew" (2017)
- "Ser del Viento" (2017)
- "Entre la Gente" (2018)
- "Ixoqi'" (2019)
- "Tukur" (2020)
- "La Siguanaba" (2020)
- "Junam" (2020)
- "Pueblos" (2021)

== Awards and nominations ==
- MTV Transformer Award at the 2021 MTV Millennial Awards
