= State of Fear: The Truth about Terrorism =

- Directed by: Pamela Yates
- Produced by: Paco de onis
- Cinematography: Juan Duran
- Edited by: Peter Kinoy
- Music by: Tito La Rosa and Tavo Castillo
- Production company: Skylight Pictures
- Distributed by: New Day Films
- Release date: 2005
- Running time: 94 minutes

State of Fear: The Truth about Terrorism (2005) is a documentary film produced by Skylight Pictures and directed by Pamela Yates. It won the 2006 Overseas Press Club Award for "Best Reporting in Any Medium on Latin America". It has been translated into 48 languages and broadcast in 157 countries.

Based on the findings of the Peruvian Truth and Reconciliation Commission, State of Fear uses personal testimony, history and archival footage to tell the story of escalating violence in Peru, and how the fear of terrorism undermined democracy. In 2000, after President Alberto Fujimori's regime collapsed under corruption scandals, the new government of Valentin Paniaqua established the Truth and Reconciliation Commission to investigate atrocities that had resulted from the violence had engulfed Peru for twenty years through the 1980s and 1990s. The Truth Commission granted Skylight Pictures access to its extensive testimonial evidence as well as hundreds of hours of rarely seen archival material and thousands of photographs.

== Themes ==
According to IMDB, while State of Fear is a Peruvian film, the lessons learned from it serve as “a cautionary tale for a world engaged in a global war on terror.” The film accomplishes this through showing the “human and societal costs” associated with fighting a war against terror. Eventually more than 70,000 people would die for this cause in Perú alone.

The film uses a variety of people and stories to weave together an intricate tapestry of the situation which faced Perú during the twenty long years of violence and terrorism. Its aim is to begin answer the question “How can an open society balance demands for security with democracy?” Through showing Peruvians struggling against attacks from both the government and the rebels of the Sendero Luminoso, the film aims to show that oftentimes democracy can only be maintained by those who wish to keep it, the people at large. The horrible violence and death juxtaposed on screen with the breath-taking beauty and mystery of the country jar the viewer, making them think deeply about how fragile societal order is. The most obvious example in the documentary being the collapse of the dictatorial regime in 2000. A seemingly unstoppable leviathan of death and destruction for the Peruvian people “collapsed beneath the weight of its own corruption.”

The film ends with modern Perú and a new, democratic government. The people have recaptured the keys of the kingdom. One of their first orders of business is to create a Truth and Reconciliation Commission to investigate the past two decades of violence and death. Piece by piece, case by case the Commission explores the atrocities which occurred, carefully, meticulously documenting them. The documentary ends with a message, that atrocities like the ones which occurred in Perú are not rare. The circumstance that led to them are common, and the hatred and anger and blood-lust which led to them are there, lying just beneath the surface of the societal psyche. Our job is to recognise that and do everything we can to maintain democracy and not sacrifice our freedom for security, because inevitably that security will become oppressive.

== See also ==
State of Fear, a novel by Michael Crichton with similar Global warming Terrorism themes.
