= Kinoy =

Kinoy is a surname. Notable people with the surname include:

- Arthur Kinoy (1920–2003), American attorney
- Ernest Kinoy (1925–2014), American writer
- Peter Kinoy, American documentary filmmaker
