= Skylight Pictures =

Founded by Pamela Yates, Peter Kinoy and Paco de Onís in 1981, Skylight is a media organization based in Brooklyn, NY that has been making feature-length documentaries and short digital projects for over 30 years. Skylight is a member of New Day Films.

Their first feature-length film, When the Mountains Tremble (1983), describes the struggle of the largely indigenous Guatemalan peasantry against a legacy of state and foreign oppression. Centered on the experiences of Nobel Peace Laureate Rigoberta Menchú, a Maya K’iche indigenous leader, the film knits a variety of forms — interviews, direct address, re-enactment, video transmission, and on the spot footage shot at great hazard — into a wide-ranging and remarkable cohesive epic canvas of the Guatemalan struggle. When the Mountains Tremble won the Special Jury Award at the Sundance Film Festival in 1984. It was released theatrically in 40 U.S. cities and 30 foreign countries, and was updated and re-released in 1992 when Rigoberta Menchú won the Nobel Peace Prize.

Their film, State of Fear: The Truth about Terrorism, won the 2006 Overseas Press Club Award for "Best Reporting in Any Medium on Latin America". Their 2009 film, The Reckoning: The Battle for the International Criminal Court was the opening night film at the 20th Annual Human Rights Watch Film Festival at Lincoln Center in 2009. Their film, Witness to War, won the Academy Award for Best Documentary Short in 1985.

Their 2011 documentary How to Nail a Dictator tells the story of how When the Mountains Tremble, aiding a new generation of human rights activists, became a granito—a tiny grain of sand—that helped tip the scales of justice in the genocide case against Guatemalan military dictator Efraín Ríos Montt for his war against the country's indigenous population in the 1980s. The documentary had its world premiere at the Sundance Film Festival on January 25, 2011, after which it was presented in close to 100 film festivals around the globe, including: Icaro Central American Film Festival in Guatemala (Best International Documentary); Geneva International Human Rights Film Festival (Peace & Reconciliation Prize in Honor of Sergio Vieira De Mello); Paris International Human Rights Film Festival (Grand Prix for Best Creative Documentary); Traverse City Film Festival (Founders Award); Politics on Film Festival, Washington DC (Grand Jury Award); Overseas Press Club Edward R. Murrow Award for Best Documentary (Honorable Mention); opening Night Film at the Human Rights Watch International Film Festival 2011 at Lincoln Center in New York; Human Rights Watch International Film Festival 2011 in London, and played at the majority of festivals in the Human Rights Film Network around the world.

Their latest feature-length documentary, 500 YEARS: Life in Resistance, is the third installment in the Guatemalan trilogy of Skylight films, The Resistance Saga, and it premiered at the Sundance Film Festival in January 2017. The film has screened around the world in more than 30 countries and it has won the Audience Award at the Cairo International Women Film Festival and the Costa Rica International Film Festival as well as Best US Documentary Award at the Traverse City Film Festival.

In addition to feature-length films, Skylight also produces complementary media tools and digital projects that work to bolster the human rights movement. These include:

- Granito: Every Memory Matters (GMEM): An online platform meant to provide a space that restores the collective memory of the genocide in Guatemala.
- Dictator in the Dock short film series: A 23 webisode series that chronicles the entire genocide trail of former dictator General Efraín Ríos Montt, gavel to gavel, which took place from March 19 to May 10, 2013.

Film	Release date	Credits
When the Mountains Tremble	July 16, 1983	Pamela Yates, Director/Sound Recordist; Peter Kinoy, Producer/Editor; Thomas Newton Sigel, Director/Cinematographer; Jean Marie-Simon, Photographer
Presumed Guilty	July 14, 2002	Pamela Yates, Producer/Director; Peter Kinoy, Producer/Editor; Rachel Raney, Co-Producer; Robert Gumpert, Photographer
State of Fear	March 31, 2005	Pamela Yates, Director; Peter Kinoy, Editor; Paco de Onís, Producer; Juan Duran, Cinematographer; Ana Caridad Sánchez, Co-Producer; Alejandro de Onís, Composer; Vera Lentz, Photographer
Living Broke in Boom Times	July 13, 2007	Pamela Yates, Producer/Director; Peter Kinoy, Producer/Editor; Dara Kell, Editor; Harvey Finkle, Photographer
The Reckoning	July 19, 2009	Pamela Yates, Director; Peter Kinoy, Editor; Paco de Onís, Producer; Marcus Bleasdale, Photographer;
Granito: How to Nail a Dictator	January 25, 2011	Pamela Yates, Director; Peter Kinoy, Editor; Paco de Onís, Producer; Melle van Essen, Cinematographer Roger C. Miller, Composer; Richard Fleming, Sound Recordist; Takaaki Okada, Graphic Design; Benny Mouthon, Sound Design; Beatriz Gallardo, Associate Producer; Dana Lixenberg, Photographer
