= The L.A. Riot Spectacular =

2005 film by Marc Klasfeld

- DVD cover
- Directed by: Marc Klasfeld
- Written by: Marc Klasfeld
- Produced by: Marc Klasfeld; John Bard Manulis; Chris Miller; Barry Opper; Lulu Zezza
- Starring: Snoop Dogg; Charles Dutton; Emilio Estevez; George Hamilton; Ted Levine; Jonathan Lipnicki
- Cinematography: Barry Norwood
- Edited by: Richard Alarcon
- Music by: Nicholas Pike
- Distributed by: Image Entertainment
- Release date: April 25, 2005 (Tribeca Film Festival)
- Running time: 80 minutes
- Country: United States
- Language: English

The L.A. Riot Spectacular is a 2005 satire film about the 1992 Los Angeles riots. Written and directed by music video director Marc Klasfeld (in his feature film directorial debut), the film stars Snoop Dogg, Charles Dutton, Emilio Estevez and George Hamilton.

== Cast ==
- Snoop Dogg as The Narrator
- Charles Dutton as Mayor Tom Bradley
- Emilio Estevez as Officer Powell
- George Hamilton as The King of Beverly Hills
- T. K. Carter as Rodney
- Charles Durning as The Lawyer
- Christopher McDonald as Officer Koon
- Jonathan Lipnicki as Tom Saltine Jr.
- Ted Levine as Tom Saltine
- William Forsythe as George Holliday
- Ronny Cox as Chief Daryl Gates
- Michael Buffer as himself
- Ron Jeremy as Arrestee
- Ian Abercrombie as Auctioneer

== See also ==
- List of hood films
