= Forced Entries: The Downtown Diaries 1971–1973 =

Book by Jim Carroll

- Author: Jim Carroll
- Language: English
- Genre: Memoir
- Publisher: Penguin Publishing Group
- Publication date: July 7, 1987
- ISBN: 9780140085020

The Downtown Diaries is a book written by Jim Carroll depicting his life from the years 1971 to 1973. While the book was called The Downtown Diaries, it was not a literal diary, such as The Basketball Diaries. Carroll had stated that most of Forced Entries was written by memory and may or may not have been totally accurate.

Most of the entries in the book are about the times of Carroll's artist career taking off, working with the likes of Andy Warhol in his Factory, hanging out at Max's Kansas City, hanging out with the Velvet Underground. It was stated that he changed the names of many people in the book, not so much for the threat of lawsuits, but due to not wanting his book being purchased and successful by name dropping. For example, “Jenny Ann” was actually Patti Smith, while “D.M.Z.” was the painter/artist Larry Rivers.

The Downtown Diaries also took a look at Carroll's heroin addiction, and his desire to get clean. It details his turning to methadone treatment and leaving New York City for California and his detox and return to New York with a new life.

== Reception ==
In a mixed review, Tom Scanlon of the Peninsula Times Tribune wrote, "Forced Entries, with its short, terse chapters, is good reading, for the most part. Carroll's dialogue is stiff, however, and his insights are indeed at times 'dubious' ... Yet when Jim Carroll hits unselfconscious grooves, his writing has a beautiful rhythm, and a burning honesty. The New York Times critic Christopher Lehmann-Haupt said, "Despite the maturing voice of Forced Entries, the two diaries remain similar in their quest for extreme sensations and their eagerness to shock the reader. One is aware almost throughout that the author is more intelligent than he appears and that he takes a certain pride in dissipating his gifts."

Wood Hochswender of the Los Angeles Times said, "As with any diary, at times the author seems quite full of himself, and, as a consequence, full of something else. ... But somehow Carroll has the slick slang to carry it off. He's a collector of fancy words, and at one point he makes a note to himself to use the words serpentine and abattoir in his poetry. Sure enough, both appear inconspicuously later in the book." In the San Francisco Examiner, Peter Delacorte wrote, "And for the next 30 pages the book is incessantly boring, because Carroll is a fish out of water. In its meandering way, the book has been leading to this: the rite of purification, the great battle against the "small pink simian" that holds Carroll captive. But nothing happens." The Boston Globe's Joseph Menn stated, "Forced Entries records Carroll's 'obscure rite of passage' as he turned his knowledge of sophisticated, vacuous New York scene-making into personal, life-saving wisdom."
