= Daybreak (1993 film) =

1993 film directed by Stephen Tolkin

- Film Poster
- Genre: Science fiction; Thriller
- Based on: Beirut by Alan Bowne
- Written by: Stephen Tolkin
- Directed by: Stephen Tolkin
- Starring: Cuba Gooding Jr.; Moira Kelly; Omar Epps; Martha Plimpton
- Music by: Michel Colombier
- Country of origin: United States
- Original language: English

Production
- Executive producers: Kathryn Galan; Colin Callender
- Producer: John Bard Manulis
- Cinematography: Tom Sigel
- Editors: Brunilda Torres; Lois Freeman-Fox
- Running time: 91 minutes
- Production company: HBO Showcase
- Budget: $3 million

Original release
- Network: HBO
- Release: May 8, 1993

Daybreak is a 1993 American sci-fi thriller television film written and directed by Stephen Tolkin, based on the 1987 Off-Broadway play Beirut by Alan Bowne. It stars Moira Kelly, Cuba Gooding Jr., Martha Plimpton, and Omar Epps, and aired on HBO on May 8, 1993.

== Plot ==
The film is set in the near future in a more authoritarian United States. It deals with the social persecution and criminalization of people who are infected with a sexually transmitted infection similar to HIV. Those who test positive for the disease are forcibly placed into quarantine camps. In the quarantine camps they are tattooed with a P by the authorities to indicate their positive status and shot if they try to escape. The quarantine camps are dilapidated places where patients are left to die without care or contact with the outside world.

Blue is a young woman who earns a living scavenging metal in the city. She goes with a friend who wants to be tested to a Helping Hand clinic. The clinic has the sinister slogan "Making your hard choices easier". Outside the clinic they are given a card warning them against getting tested there. The card demands "Why is sickness a crime? Why is hospital a prison? Why does the helping hand hold a gun?". Blue is disturbed by this warning and meets an activist in the resistance called Torch.

The resistance works to prevent the quarantine of those who are positive. They arrange testing outside the official system so that they will not be quarantined. They rescue people being held by the Helping Hand clinic in order to give them medicine, care, and understanding. They distribute condoms and clean needles to help prevent the spread of the disease. This is contrasted with government advertisements for the Helping Hand clinics that threaten "The only way is not to play".

A relationship develops between Blue and Torch and it is revealed that Torch is positive. Torch is arrested because of his activism and when the police discover that he is positive they send him to quarantine. Blue sneaks into the quarantine in order to see Torch. Blue wants to be infected by Torch so that they can live together inside the quarantine camp, but Torch is reluctant to infect Blue. In the end she escapes at his urging and continues the fight on the outside.

== Cast ==
- Moira Kelly as "Blue"
- Cuba Gooding Jr. as "Torch"
- Martha Plimpton as Laurie
- Omar Epps as Hunter
- Alice Drummond as Anna
- Amir Williams as Willie
- David Eigenberg as "Bucky"
- John Cameron Mitchell as Lennie
- Willie Garson as Simon
- Mark Boone Jr. as Quarantine Guard
- Deirdre O'Connell as Mom
- Jon Seda as Payne
- Phil Parolisi as Russell
- Paul Butler as Truck Driver
- Alix Koromzay as Woman In Quarantine
- Nick Chinlund as Commander
- Phil Hartman as Man In Abstinence Commercial
- John Savage as The President

== Production ==
Filming took place in New York City, including Lower Manhattan.
