= Swing Kids (1993 film) =

1993 film by Thomas Carter

- Theatrical release poster
- Directed by: Thomas Carter
- Written by: Jonathan Marc Feldman
- Produced by: Mark Gordon; John Bard Manulis
- Starring: Robert Sean Leonard; Christian Bale; Frank Whaley; Barbara Hershey
- Cinematography: Jerzy Zielinski
- Edited by: Michael R. Miller
- Music by: James Horner
- Production companies: Hollywood Pictures; Touchwood Pacific Partners
- Distributed by: Buena Vista Pictures Distribution
- Release date: March 5, 1993
- Running time: 112 minutes
- Country: United States
- Language: English
- Budget: $12 million
- Box office: $5.6 million

Swing Kids is a 1993 American historical drama film directed by Thomas Carter in his feature film debut, and starring Robert Sean Leonard, Christian Bale, Frank Whaley, Barbara Hershey and Kenneth Branagh. The title refers to a youth subculture in Nazi Germany, in which teenagers embraced American and British swing music in defiance of the Nazi regime. The film follows two high school students in their attempt to be swing kids by night and Hitler Youth by day, a decision that acutely impacts their friends and families.

The film was released by Buena Vista Pictures on March 5, 1993. It received mixed reviews from critics.

== Plot ==
In Hamburg in 1939, Peter Müller and Thomas Berger join their friends Arvid and Otto at a swing club called the Bismarck. They have a good time, dancing and enjoying the music.

Peter goes home to find his mother in an argument with the Nazi Blockleiter. Herr Knopp, head of the local Gestapo, arrives and curtly dismisses the Blockleiter. Herr Knopp begins asking Frau Müller questions about some of her late husband's friends. Herr Müller had been accused of being a communist, and his health was irreparably damaged by an interrogation at the hands of Nazi agents.

At Arvid's house, Thomas accidentally ruins one of Arvid's prized records. Upset, Arvid kicks Thomas, Peter and Otto out. To apologize to Arvid, Peter and Thomas steal a radio (which Peter knows was stolen from a ransacked Jewish home) from a bakery. Thomas escapes, but Peter is caught. Herr Knopp, who is attracted to Peter's mother, intercedes for him; in return, Peter must enroll in the Hitlerjugend (HJ). Thomas also joins, telling Peter that they will be able to enjoy both the privileges of Hitler Youth membership and the pleasures of being Swing Kids.

Arvid is confronted on the street by a group of Hitler Youth, including former friend and fellow Swing Kid Emil. They beat him and break his hand, threatening his work as a jazz musician.

Peter, who has a job delivering books, is asked to spy on his boss, whom the Nazis suspect is working against the Reich. In HJ school, the boys are encouraged to spy on their friends and families. Thomas accuses his father of insulting Hitler, hoping to cause trouble for him, but is unnerved when the Nazis come to his home and take his father away. His subsequent attempts to resume his friendship with Peter and persuade him to collaborate with the Nazis are tinged with fear.

Arvid overcomes his injury and is able to play music again. However, while working at a jazz club, he refuses to play a German song, lashing out at the club's patrons for being blind to the Nazi agenda. Peter is sympathetic but Thomas loudly argues the Nazi side. Peter angrily proclaims Thomas to be a "fucking Nazi" to which Thomas responds "Oh, so what if I am?" and Peter storms off. Blacklisted from playing in clubs, Arvid realizes there is nothing for him in Germany and dies by suicide.

As Thomas begins to believe fully in Nazi ideology, Peter feels as though there is no hope for him. Peter, disenchanted with how his life is coming apart, dresses up and goes to a swing club which is scheduled to be raided by members of the HJ. As Thomas begins assaulting the club's patrons he attacks Peter; however, during the fight Peter is able to reach Thomas. Thomas begs Peter to run away but Peter won't. As Peter is driven away by the police, his younger brother Willi loudly shouts "Swing Heil!" over and over again, proud that his brother stood up for being a swing kid.

Epilogue text reveals that a second generation of Swing Kids lived to see the Nazis defeated.

== Cast ==
- Robert Sean Leonard as Peter Müller
- Christian Bale as Thomas Berger
- Frank Whaley as Arvid
- Tushka Bergen as Evey
- Julia Stemberger as Frau Linge
- David Tom as Willi
- David Robb as Dr. Berger
- Noah Wyle as Emil
- Barbara Hershey as Frau Müller
- Jessica Hynes as Helga

In addition, Kenneth Branagh appears repeatedly, uncredited, in the role of SS-Sturmbannführer Knopp, and Martin Clunes appears as Bannführer.

== Historical background ==
In the 1930s, some young German teens favored American and British pop culture; they hung out in secret underground clubs where bands played swing music and listened to contemporary music by acts like Benny Goodman and Duke Ellington. The film's screenwriter, Jonathan Marc Feldman, based the film on this eponymous Swing Kids movement, although at time, the term "Schlurf" was more commonly used.

== Reception ==
=== Critical response ===
On the review aggregator website Rotten Tomatoes, 56% of 18 critics' reviews are positive, with an average rating of 4.9/10. Metacritic, which uses a weighted average, assigned the film a score of 39 out of 100, based on 20 critics, indicating "generally unfavorable" reviews.

Jonathan Rosenbaum of Chicago Reader described the film as a "corny but sincere weeper". Roger Ebert of the Chicago Sun-Times gave the film one star out of 4 and criticized the film as "murky", feeling that the story avoided the Nazi atrocities to the point of his wondering: "If Hitler had encouraged the swing clubs, would the Kids have still developed problems with Nazism?" In a 2005 retrospective of Ebert's all-time lowest rated films, he included Swing Kids in the grouping "Sex, romance, music, drama and other crap". Writing for the MIT student newspaper, The Tech, reporter Joshua M. Andresen called it "amazing", and felt that the "well-researched film is wonderfully acted".

A contemporary film reviewer wrote:

In the eyes of today's teenagers, Nazis are simplistic villains who get outsmarted, out-gunned and outmaneuvered by Indiana Jones in Raiders of the Lost Ark and other simplistic action-adventure tales. For that uninformed youth audience, Swing Kids is a grim history lesson on the horrors the Nazis inflicted on fellow Germans during Adolf Hitler's move toward World War in 1939.

=== Box office ===
In the United States and Canada, Swing Kids grossed $5.6 million at the box office, against a budget of $12 million.

=== Home release ===
The film released on VHS by Hollywood Pictures Home Video on December 13, 1993, and later DVD. The film has since been made available digitally and through streaming

== Soundtrack ==
The soundtrack includes a combination of swing music and the film's score.

1. "Sing, Sing, Sing (With a Swing)" – 5:05
2. "Nothing to Report" – 1:37
3. "Shout and Feel It" – 2:27
4. "It Don't Mean a Thing (If It Ain't Got That Swing)" – 2:51 (Both in soundtrack and sung by protagonists)
5. "The Letter" – 4:12
6. "Flat Foot Floogee" – 3:20
7. "Arvid Beaten" – 2:12
8. "Swingtime in the Rockies" – 3:10
9. "Daphne" – 1:52
10. "Training for Utopia" – 3:45
11. "Life Goes to a Party/Jumpin' at the Woodside" – 2:17
12. "Goodnight, My Love" – 3:08
13. "Ashes" – 4:21
14. "Bei Mir Bist Du Schön" – 4:11
15. "The Bismarck" – 3:06
16. "Swing Heil″ – 5:28
