= Billie Heller =

American activist (1928–2018)

- Born: Billie Love Rosenfield; 1928; Springfield, Ohio
- Died: April 2018 (aged 89–90); Beverly Hills, California
- Education: University of California, Los Angeles
- Occupation: Women's rights activist
- Years active: 1950s -2000s
- Spouse: Seymour Heller (m. 1951)
- Children: David Heller, Bruce Heller, Liz Heller
- Awards: Global Women's Rights Award, Feminist Majority Foundation, special award (2009)

Billie Heller (1928 – April 2018) was an American activist. An early advocate for women's rights, she was the founding member and chair of the national committee on the United Nations Convention on the Elimination of All Forms of Discrimination Against Women and a member of the steering committee for the National Women's Political Caucus.

== Early life ==
Heller was born Billie Love Rosenfield in Springfield, Ohio. Her parents were active in the Democratic Party, and she was first exposed to political activism as a child.

== Career ==
She attended the University of California, Los Angeles, where she organized social and political activities, and later, through the Sierra Club, became an environmental activist. Working with the Ralph Nader Center for Study of Responsive Law, she advocated for consumer rights.

At 40, she became involved with the Gray Panthers, an intergenerational advocacy group which focused on age related inequity and injustice, and helped to establish eight Los Angeles chapters as a network leader. In 1971, she led a Gray Panthers protest at the US Consumer Affairs office, and in 1973 testified before the United States Senate Special Committee on Aging.

As the founding member and chair of the National Committee on the United Nations Convention on the Elimination of Discrimination, Heller led the fight to ratify the Women's Rights Treaty in the United States. In 2009, she received a Global Women's Rights Award from the Feminist Majority Foundation to honor her 30 years of work towards its ratification.

== Personal life ==
Heller was married for more than 50 years to talent manager Seymour Heller. They had three children, David, Liz, and Bruce. A longtime resident of Beverly Hills, California, she died in April 2018.

== Legacy ==
Heller's personal and professional papers are held in the University Library at California State University, Northridge.
