= Witness to Apartheid =

1986 film

- Directed by: Sharon I. Sopher
- Written by: Peter Kinoy; Sharon I. Sopher
- Produced by: Sharon I. Sopher
- Narrated by: Sharon I. Sopher
- Cinematography: Peter Tischhauser
- Edited by: Laurence Solomon
- Distributed by: California Newsreel
- Release date: 1986
- Running time: 58 minutes
- Country: United States
- Language: English

Witness to Apartheid is a 1986 American documentary film directed by Sharon I. Sopher. It was nominated for an Academy Award for Best Documentary Feature. Written by Sopher and Peter Kinoy, the film also won a Cine Golden Eagle. Sopher also won an Emmy Award for its direction.
