= The Big Empty (2005 film) =

- Directed by: Lisa Chang; Newton Thomas Sigel
- Written by: Lisa Chang; Newton Thomas Sigel
- Produced by: Lisa Chang; Newton Thomas Sigel
- Starring: Selma Blair; Elias Koteas; Richard Kind; Hugh Laurie
- Cinematography: Newton Thomas Sigel
- Release date: December 31, 2005
- Running time: 21:13 minutes
- Country: United States
- Language: English

The Big Empty is a 2005 short film starring Selma Blair about a woman with an unusual condition that baffles scientists and laymen alike. It was written, directed and produced by Lisa Chang and Newton Thomas Sigel. It is based on the short story The Specialist, by Alison Smith. It was executive produced by George Clooney and Steven Soderbergh.

== Plot ==
A young woman, Alice, goes to the gynecologist with a mysterious ache inside her. When one doctor can't figure out just what the problem is, she sees another, and still more, until finally one specialist finds that she has an enormous, empty tundra inside of her, the opening of which is her vagina. She is forced into a media parade, brought onto talk shows so that the specialist can talk about his discovery. Alice is treated coldly, like her emptiness is the only thing important about her, and still she aches. A challenge is put forth to see who would be willing to enter the vast tundra and see where it might lead; several men enter and travel for a long time, but find nothing but ice. One young man enters and does not come back out. At the end, Alice goes to a beach and stands by the water. In a rush, the ice from the emptiness inside her flows out, freezing the ocean, and the young man appears beside her.

The Big Empty's theme song was "Song to the Siren" by This Mortal Coil, which played during the final scene.

== Cast ==
- Selma Blair as Alice
- Elias Koteas as The Specialist
- Richard Kind as TV Show Host
- Hugh Laurie as Doctor
- Gabriel Mann as The Thoughtful Man
