= John Bard Manulis =

American media executive

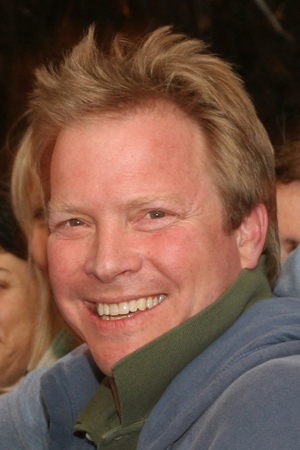
- Born: September 8, 1956 (age 70); Los Angeles, California
- Education: Harvard University
- Occupations: Producer, director, social/political activist, entrepreneur
- Organization(s): Writers Guild of America East; Producers Guild of America; Academy of Motion Picture Arts and Sciences
- Board member of: The Liberty Hill Foundation; The Getty House Foundation
- Spouse: Liz Heller
- Website: Official website

John Bard Manulis (born September 8, 1956) is an American film, television and theater producer and director, entrepreneur and social justice activist. He has produced or executive produced more than 20 films, television programs, and theater productions, including Charlotte Sometimes, The Basketball Diaries, Swing Kids, Arctic Tale, Foxfire, HBO's Blindside, and The Umbilical Brothers: THWAK.

Manulis's projects integrate social and political themes such as drug addiction (The Basketball Diaries); repression and rebellion (Swing Kids); AIDS, individual freedom, and biracial relationships (Daybreak); the Vietnam War (Intimate Strangers); female empowerment (Foxfire, V.I. Warshawski); poverty (American Idol Gives Back) and climate change/environmental consciousness (Arctic Tale).

== Early life and education ==
Manulis was born in Los Angeles to actress Katharine Bard and Martin Manulis, a film, television, and theater producer.

He attended Harvard College after his preparatory school education at Harvard School, in North Hollywood, California.

Manulis graduated from Harvard with a Bachelor of Arts in English and American Literature and Language. He was president of the Harvard Dramatic Club, and directed numerous productions, including the musical Two Gentleman of Verona, by John Guare and Galt MacDermot, which he independently produced and presented outdoors in Harvard Yard, and a multimedia adaptation of U.S.A. by John Dos Passos on the Loeb Mainstage.

During summer breaks, Manulis worked on films, most notably as a production assistant on All The President's Men and as assistant art director on Lee Grant's Academy Award nominee The Stranger.

== Career ==
=== Theater ===
After graduating from Harvard, Manulis moved to New York, where he began his professional career as Marshall W. Mason's assistant at the renowned Circle Repertory Company. Promoted to casting director in 1980, he continued to work with Mason, co-directing John Bishop's The Great Grandson of Jedediah Kohler and assistant directing Lanford Wilson's Pulitzer Prize-winning trilogy, Talley's Folly, Fifth of July and A Tale Told; Hamlet, starring William Hurt, and Murder at the Howard Johnson's, which was produced on Broadway. He directed workshop productions at Circle Rep, Playwrights Horizons, and Manhattan Theatre Club. In addition, Manulis directed Marjorie Appleman's Seduction Duet, which starred Jeff Daniels and won the 1981 Samuel French One-Act Festival.

Manulis has also produced several plays, including 1988's Three Ways Home at the Astor Place Theater in New York, and The Umbilical Brothers: THWAK, which was produced in 1999/2000 at Off-Broadway's Minetta Lane Theatre and at the Tiffany Theater in Los Angeles.

In 1979, Manulis was chosen by Arthur Penn, Elia Kazan and Joseph Mankiewicz to become a Founding Member of the Actors Studio Playwrights and Directors Unit.

=== Film and television ===
In 1983, Manulis joined the Nederlander Organization, where he brought projects through development and production as an executive producer in their newly formed television and film division. While at Nederlander, Manulis was involved with producing properties ranging from the ACE Award-winning A Case of Libel, starring Daniel J. Travanti and Ed Asner, to Intimate Strangers, a television movie starring Teri Garr and Stacy Keach. He created the Comedy Zone, a weekly one-hour series on CBS, which brought together writers and actors such as Neil Simon, Kathleen Turner, Wendy Wasserstein, Joe Mantegna, Jules Feiffer and Christopher Durang.

Manulis went on to serve as Vice President of Film for Edgar Scherick Associates, Senior VP of Production for Jeffrey Lurie's Chestnut Hill Productions, and Head of Worldwide Production and Acquisition for Samuel Goldwyn Films, where he supervised the production or acquisition of films such as The Madness of King George, Lolita, American Buffalo, I Shot Andy Warhol, Welcome to Woop Woop, Bent and Tortilla Soup.

Manulis and his first grade classmate, Peter Jones, collaborated on Fortunate Sons, a documentary about their high school class and "friendship, life, loss, and renewal". It was released in November 2025.

=== Live events ===
In 2008, Manulis produced the campaign events involving local, regional and national surrogates for Barack Obama's Campaign for Change in Colorado. He produced the short filmmaking competitions for Microsoft's Imagine Cup in both Brazil (2004) and Japan (2005), and the Liberty Hill Foundation's annual Upton Sinclair Award dinner (2003, 2004, 2005). With Gary Sinise, he directed the Directors Guild of America's memorial tribute to the life of director John Frankenheimer.

=== Digital media and technology ===
Manulis co-founded Visionbox Media Group, a production, post-production and distribution consulting company using digital technology to produce and distribute films and television content in 2000. In a 2002 interview with the Los Angeles Times he said: "Definitions are changing on everything, even what the word 'digital' means. There are so many technologies that are encompassed in that one word....The one thing everyone agrees on is that 'digital' equals change."

In 2011, Manulis and his wife, Liz Heller, founded Screenspaces, a social technology company.

== Activism ==
Manulis was recognized by the Los Angeles County Board of Supervisors as one of their 2012 Leaders To Watch. He serves on the board of directors for The Getty House Foundation, and on the board of the Liberty Hill Foundation. Manulis and Heller received the Liberty Hill Founder's Award in 2010.

Manulis is a volunteer and strategic advisor for Centinela Youth Services (CYS), a community-led restorative justice non-profit, and EVAC, a youth-led movement that originated in Jacksonville, Florida.

== Credits ==
Year	Title	Credit	Medium
2025	Fortunate Sons	Producer	Documentary
2007	Arctic Tale	Executive producer	Film (documentary)
2007	American Idol; Gives Back	Executive producer, documentary segments	TV series (2 episodes)
2006	Believe in Me	Producer	Film
2006	The Woods	Production Executive	Film
2006	The Painted Veil	CEO, Visionbox Media Group	Film
2006	First Snow	CEO, Visionbox Media Group	Film
2006	The Illusionist	CEO, Visionbox Media Group	Film
2005	The L.A. Riot Spectacular	Producer	Film
2004	Malibu Eyes	Executive producer	Video
2003	Master and Commander	As Production Executive (MGM)	Film
2002	Teddy Bear's Picnic	Executive producer	Film
2002	Charlotte Sometimes	Executive producer	Film
2001	Falling Like This	Executive producer	Film
2001	Tortilla Soup	Producer	Film
2001	Comics on Campus	Co-executive Producer	TV series pilot
1999	The Invisibles	Executive producer	Film
1999	The Umbilical Brothers: THWAK	Producer	Theater (Minetta Lane Theater)
1997	Welcome to Woop Woop	Executive producer	Film
1997	The Chambermaid on the Titanic	As Production Executive (MGM)	Film
1997	Bent	As Production Executive (MGM)	Film
1996	Foxfire	Producer	Film
1996	The Preacher's Wife	Executive in Charge of Production	Film
1995	The Basketball Diaries	Producer	Film
1995	Napoleon	Executive in Charge of Production	Film
1994	The Madness of King George	Executive in Charge of Production	Film
1993	Swing Kids	Producer	Film
1993	Daybreak	Producer	Television Movie
1993	Blindside	Executive producer	Television Movie
1991	V.I. Warshawski	Co-executive Producer	Film
1988	Three Ways Home	Producer	Theater (Astor Place Theater)
1986	Intimate Strangers	Executive producer	Television Movie
1984	Comedy Zone	Executive producer/Creator	TV series (5 episodes)
1982	The Great Grandson of Jedediah Kohler	Director (with Marshall W. Mason)	Theater (Circle Repertory)
1981	Foxtrot by the Bay	Director	Theater (Circle Repertory at the White Barn Theater)
1981	The Suicide	Assistant director	Theater (Broadway)
1981	Fifth of July	Assistant director	Theater (Mark Taper Forum)
1981	Talley's Folly	Assistant director	Theater (Mark Taper Forum)
1981	A Tale Told	Assistant director	Theater (Circle Repertory)
1981	Seduction Duet	Director	Theater (Circle Repertory)
1980	Talley's Folly	Assistant director	Theater (Broadway)
1979	The Deserter	Director	Theater (Circle Repertory)
1978	Twelfth Night	Assistant Stage Manager	Theater (Academy Festival Theater)
1976	All The President's Men	Art Department liaison	Film
