= Seymour Heller =

American talent agent (1914-2001)

- Born: September 9, 1914; Cleveland, Ohio, United States
- Died: October 8, 2001 (aged 87); Beverly Hills, California, United States
- Occupations: Artist manager, talent agent
- Spouse: Billie Heller (m. 1950)
- Children: 3

Seymour Heller (September 9, 1914 – October 8, 2001) was an American talent agent and artist's manager. Beginning his career during the Big Band Era, Heller spent more than 60 years in the entertainment industry. He was best known for his association with Liberace, whom he signed in 1950 and represented until the entertainer died in 1987.

== Career ==
While attending college at Case Western University in the late 1930s, Heller worked for MCA, then a thriving talent agency. Based in his hometown of Cleveland, he represented the leading artists of the day, including Glenn Miller, Tommy Dorsey, Sammy Kaye, Glen Gray and Count Basie, among others.

Heller joined the Coast Guard during World War II. His entertainment expertise became the foundation for his service in the military, where he acted as an advance man for Tars and Spars, a comedy show and recruiting vehicle starring Victor Mature, Sid Caesar, Gower Champion and Bob Fosse.

In 1945, after the conclusion of the war, Heller moved to Los Angeles and in 1947 partnered with associates Dick Gabbe and Sam J. Lutz to form the first coast-to-coast personal management firm, Gabbe, Lutz and Heller. The launch of Gabbe, Lutz and Heller marked the beginning of Heller's lengthy association with The Treniers, whom he managed for nearly 60 years. In addition, Heller represented Ginger Rogers, Debbie Reynolds, Donald O'Connor, Helen O'Connell, Frankie Lane, Regis Philbin, The Standells, Jimmie Rodgers, The McGuire Sisters, and Lawrence Welk, among many others. Gabbe, Lutz and Heller was the preeminent personal management company of the time, and was considered a pioneering talent agency.

In 1950, pianist Wladziu Valentino Liberace, known as Liberace, invited Heller to a performance at the Hotel Coronado in San Diego, California. Heller immediately agreed to represent the performer, who later called his first impression of Liberace “lightning in a bottle.” Heller is credited with “launching the Liberace rocket ride,” which included a weekly television show, an immediate success which was syndicated to more than 200 television stations by 1954. Additionally, in the early part of his association with Heller, Liberace broke records as he quickly sold out performances at Carnegie Hall, the Hollywood Bowl, and Royal Albert Hall, among others. In 1954, more than 120,000 concertgoers came to a Liberace show at Chicago's Soldier Field, setting a still-impressive attendance record, and in 1955, Heller negotiated the then unheard of sum of $50,000 per week when Liberace opened Las Vegas' Riviera Hotel.

From the 1950s through the 1970s, Liberace was the highest-paid performer in the world, and he continued to break records into the 1980s, when he made a year's gross of $1,665,331 at Radio City Music Hall. Under Heller's superintendence, Liberace achieved multi-platform success; according to a 1985 article in Billboard magazine, Heller shaped the strategies that would ensure a long and profitable career for Liberace, and that his "pragmatic vision made Liberace into what he is – one of the longest-running success stories in show business today." Heller managed Liberace until the entertainer's death in 1987.

Heller later owned the renowned recording studio Producer's Workshop (later called Westbeach Recorders) in Hollywood, where Liberace recorded in his later years, as well as pop music luminaries Fleetwood Mac, Ringo Starr, Pink Floyd, El Coco, and many others. He also had a partnership with Ray Harris in the early disco record label American Variety International (AVI), which produced and released many records between 1974 and 1984 and also owned interests in music publishing. He did other business under the names Attarack/Heller and Associates in the 1960s, and Seymour Heller and Associates in 1984. In 1989 Seymour joined forces with Daniel S. Mitrovich and created the "Heller/Mitrovich" company with offices on Wilshire Blvd in Los Angeles. Their partnership was celebrated in Las Vegas with Colonel Thomas Parker, famed manager of Elvis Presley in the pent house of the colonel. Also helping to celebrated was Debbie Reynolds, Robert Goulet, Donald O'Connor and Rip Taylor. The partnership was short lived as Seymour suffered a stroke while breakfasting with Daniel at the famed Nate'n Al's. Mitrovich closed the partnership down soon after Seymour recovered. Daniel Mitrovich was the creator of the "Welk Theatre in Branson Mo, owned and operated by "Welk Resorts". Daniel Mitrovich and Lawrence Welk Jr. had a disagreement which resulted in Daniel Mitrovich dropping out of the relationship.

Heller died of natural causes in his Beverly Hills home on October 8, 2001.

== The Seymour Heller Awards ==
In 1954, Heller co-founded the Talent Managers Association, formerly known as the National Conference of Personal Managers. A non-profit designed to promote and encourage the highest standards of professional ethics and behavior in the practice of talent management, Heller was an active member of The Talent Managers Association from its inception until his death in 2001. In honor of his memory, the members of the organization, along with Heller's family, created the Seymour Heller Awards, given to "recognize those industry professionals who operate with the dedication, high standards and ethical treatment that Seymour achieved in his lifetime."

== In pop culture ==
Known for his outsized personality, Heller was often referred to by his nickname, the Shagman. In a 1989 feature in Details, writer Allee Willis describes him as "Seymour or Shagman or simply the Shag, a beacon of light in the long annals of Hollywood history. In the world of management, where heads are made of concrete and life is seen through a roll of dollar bills, Shag is a prince, a saint and a true believer. He is as happening today as he was fifty years ago, the first to arrive at the party and the last to leave."

He appeared as himself on a 1983 episode of the television series Hotel, and was credited as a special guest in a 1990 television movie, Mother Goose's Rock N Rhyme. In addition, Heller made frequent appearances in music videos, most notably as a weather man in Breakfast Club's "Right On Track" on YouTube clip in 1987, and as a caricature of himself in Jimmy Buffett’s "Homemade Music" on YouTube in 1988.

Heller figured prominently into two 1988 television films documenting Liberace's life, Liberace and Liberace: Behind the Music. In 2013 a third film, Behind the Candelabra, aired on HBO. The movie stars Michael Douglas as Liberace and Dan Aykroyd as Heller.

Heller was also the subject of A Tribute To Seymour Heller, a 2008 short, honoring his career.

== Philanthropy ==
While Heller preferred to keep his philanthropic activities private, his support for the Famous People Players of Canada was well documented. A puppet show performed by mentally handicapped adults, The Famous People Players of Canada created a Liberace puppet and soon thereafter enlisted Heller to support their efforts. Heller booked the Famous People Players of Canada to open Liberace's show in Las Vegas in 1975, and subsequently sat on the troupe's board.

Heller was also active in The Liberace Foundation, which helped talented students in Southern Nevada pursue careers in the performing and creative arts through scholarship assistance and artistic exposure.

== Family ==
Heller married Billie Rosenfield in 1951. A former secretary, she founded and chaired the National Committee on the United Nations Convention on the Elimination of Discrimination of Women and is a noted consumer rights activist. The Hellers had two sons, David and Bruce, and a daughter, Liz. She is the founder of Buzztone, a Los Angeles-based marketing and media company.
