= Jim Carroll =

American author and musician (1949–2009)

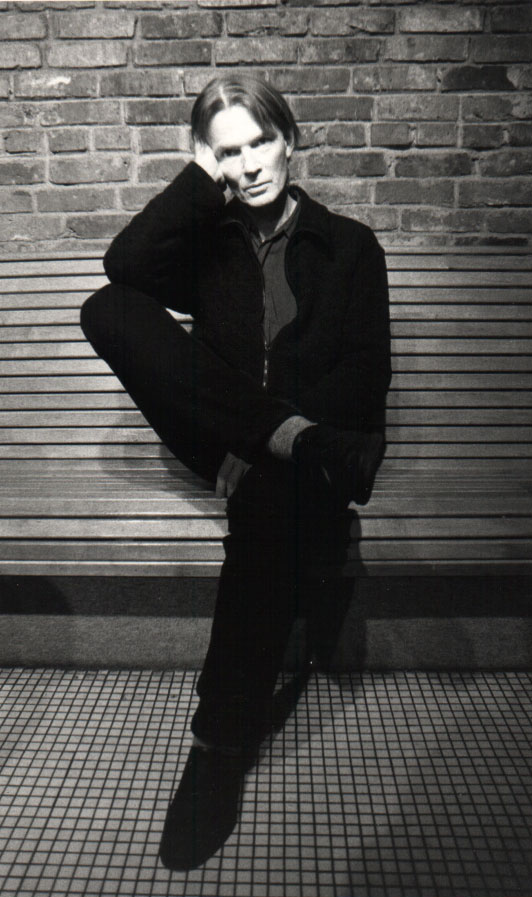
- In Seattle, 2000
- Born: James Dennis Carroll; August 1, 1949; New York City, U.S.
- Died: September 11, 2009 (aged 60); New York City, U.S.
- Occupations: Author; poet; musician
- Spouse: Rosemary Klemfuss (m. 1978; div. 1986)
- Writing career
- Period: 1967–2009
- Notable work: The Basketball Diaries Catholic Boy
- Musical career
- Genres: Punk rock; new wave
- Instruments: Vocals
- Label: Atlantic Records
- Formerly of: The Jim Carroll Band

James Dennis Carroll (August 1, 1949 – September 11, 2009) was an American author, poet, and punk musician. Carroll was best known for his 1978 autobiographical work The Basketball Diaries, which inspired a 1995 film of the same title that starred Leonardo DiCaprio as Carroll, and his 1980 song "People Who Died" with the Jim Carroll Band.

== Early life and education ==
James Dennis Carroll was born on August 1, 1949 to a working-class family of Irish descent, and grew up in New York City's Lower East Side. When he was about 11 (in the sixth grade) his family moved north to Inwood in Upper Manhattan.

He was taught by the LaSalle Christian Brothers. In the fall of 1963, he entered Rice High School in Harlem, but was soon awarded a scholarship to the elite Trinity School. He attended Trinity from 1964 to 1968.

Carroll was a basketball star in high school, but also developed an addiction to heroin. He sometimes financed his habit through criminal behavior, including engaging in prostitution in the vicinity of 53rd Street and Third Avenue in Manhattan. Carroll briefly attended Wagner College and Columbia University. Carroll and Patti Smith were close friends (and for a short time were in a relationship), and the early 1970s lived together an apartment in New York City, along with Robert Mapplethorpe.

== Career ==
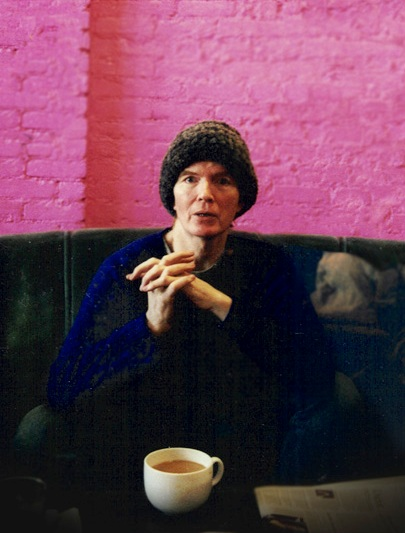
Jim Carroll in New York City (2005)

=== Downtown years (1960s to 1973) ===
While still in high school, Carroll published his first collection of poems, Organic Trains. Already attracting the attention of the local literati, his work began appearing in the Poetry Project's magazine The World in 1967. Soon his work was being published in elite literary magazines like Paris Review in 1968, and Poetry the following year. In 1970, his second collection of poems, 4 Ups and 1 Down was published, and he started working for Andy Warhol. At first, he was writing film dialogue and inventing character names; later on, Carroll worked as the co-manager of Warhol's Theater. Carroll's first publication by a mainstream publisher (Grossman Publishers), the poetry collection Living at the Movies, was published in 1973.

=== Relocation to California, The Basketball Diaries, and the Jim Carroll Band (1973 to 1983) ===
In 1973, using money made from sales of Living at the Movies, Carroll relocated to Bolinas, California for a fresh start and to get clean from heroin addiction. Carroll lived quietly there while his health recovered and he worked on his writing. In the late 1970s, several career-defining events took place that raised his public profile beyond the poetry milieu in which he had become established.

In 1978, Carroll published The Basketball Diaries, an autobiographical book concerning his life as a teenager in New York City's hard drug culture. Diaries is an edited collection of the diaries he kept during his high school years; it details his sexual experiences, his high school basketball career, and his addiction to heroin. The initial 1978 edition was published by a Bolinas-based independent publisher, Tombouctou, run by poet Michael Wolfe. The success of the first edition led to the publication of a mass market edition in 1980 by Bantam Books.

Carroll accompanied Patti Smith on a West Coast leg of her band's 1978 tour. At a gig in San Diego, Smith had Carroll do a 10-minute reading of his poetry while her band backed him musically. Encouraged by the positive response, Carroll decided to fully redirect his creative energies to rock music. Soon after, while walking his dogs on the beach in Bolinas, he came across a performance by a local rock group called Amsterdam. After backing him at a poetry reading in San Francisco, Amsterdam became his full time band, renaming themselves The Jim Carroll Band.

The Jim Carroll Band released their best known album Catholic Boy in 1980. Carroll relocated back to New York City that same year, and the band underwent several changes of lineup over the next few years. They released two other albums by 1983, after which Carroll decided to leave music to refocus on writing.

=== Later career (1983 to 2009) ===
After working as a musician, Carroll returned to writing full-time in the mid-1980s, though he continued to write lyrics for musicians such as Blue Öyster Cult and Boz Scaggs. In 1987, Carroll wrote a second memoir, Forced Entries: The Downtown Diaries 1971–1973, continuing his autobiography into his early adulthood in the New York City music and art scene as well as his struggle to kick his drug habit.

Carroll also began to appear regularly on the spoken-word circuit. Starting in 1991, Carroll performed readings from his then-in-progress first novel, The Petting Zoo. He contributed a rap to the Rancid song "Junkie Man" on their 1995 album ...And Out Come The Wolves. The title of the album is derived from the lyric that Carroll wrote and performed while in the studio.

In 1995, Canadian filmmaker John L'Ecuyer adapted "Curtis's Charm", a short story from Carroll's 1993 book Fear of Dreaming, into the film Curtis's Charm.

== Personal life and death ==
Carroll became sober in the late 1970s. After moving to California, he met Rosemary Klemfuss and the two were married in 1978. The marriage eventually ended in divorce, but the pair remained friends.

Carroll died of a heart attack while working at his desk at his Manhattan home on September 11, 2009, at the age of 60. At the time of his death, he was in ill health due to pneumonia and hepatitis C. His funeral Mass was held at Our Lady of Pompeii Catholic Church on Carmine Street in Greenwich Village.

== Influences ==
Carroll identified Rainer Maria Rilke, Frank O'Hara, John Ashbery, James Schuyler, Allen Ginsberg, and William S. Burroughs as influences on his artistic career.

== Legacy ==
=== "People Who Died" ===
The Jim Carroll Band released a single, "People Who Died", from their debut album, which made it to No. 103 on the Bubbling Under Hot 100 chart. The song's title was based on a poem by Ted Berrigan.

"People Who Died" has continued to be used in other media and covered by other musicians. The first known use of "People Who Died" in film or television was in Steven Spielberg's 1982 film E.T. the Extra-Terrestrial opening the first scene with dialogue while the boys play Dungeons & Dragons. It was also used in the 1985 film Tuff Turf (which also featured a cameo appearance by the band), in the 1995 film The Basketball Diaries (based on Carroll's autobiography). It was one of two songs that played during the end credits of the 2004 film Dawn of the Dead, and it was additionally used in James Gunn's 2021 film The Suicide Squad during the title sequence.

== Books ==
=== Poetry ===
- Organic Trains (1967)
- 4 Ups and 1 Down (Angel Hair Press; 1970)
- Living at the Movies (Penguin Books; September 24, 1973)
- The Book of Nods (Puffin; April 1, 1986)
- Fear of Dreaming: The Selected Poems (Penguin Books; November 1, 1993)
- Void of Course: Poems 1994–1997 (Penguin Books; October 1, 1998) ISBN 0-14-058909-0
- 8 Fragments for Kurt Cobain (1994)

=== Prose ===
- The Basketball Diaries (memoir) (1978)
- Forced Entries: The Downtown Diaries 1971–1973 (memoir) (1987)
- The Petting Zoo (novel) (2010; published posthumously)

== Discography ==
=== Albums ===
- Catholic Boy (1980)
- Live Dreams (1981)
- Dry Dreams (1982)
- I Write Your Name (1983)
- A World Without Gravity: Best of The Jim Carroll Band (1993)
- Pools of Mercury (1998) (2012 Digital Download)
- Runaway EP (2000)

=== Spoken word ===
- Praying Mantis (1991) (2008 Digipak reissue)
- The Basketball Diaries (1994)
- Pools of Mercury (1998)

=== Collaborations ===
- Live at Max's Kansas City, The Velvet Underground (1972)
- Club Ninja, Blue Öyster Cult (1985)
- Mistrial, Lou Reed (1986)
- Other Roads, Boz Scaggs (1988)
- Between Thought and Expression: The Lou Reed Anthology, Lou Reed (1992)
- ...And Out Come the Wolves, Rancid (1995)
- Catholic Boy, Pearl Jam (1995)
- Feeling You Up, Truly (1997)
- Yes I Ram, Jon Tiven Group (1999)

=== Compilations and soundtracks ===
- The Dial-a-Poem Poets (1972)
- Disconnected (1974)
- The Nova Convention (1979), with a once-only Frank Zappa performance
- One World Poetry (1981)
- Better an Old Demon than a New God (1984)
- Lou Reed at the Capitol Theatre (1984)
- Tuff Turf soundtrack (1985)
- Release #8 - 1993 (1993)
- Back to the Streets: Celebrating the Music of Don Covay (1993)
- Sedated in the Eighties (1993)
- New Wave Dance Hits: Just Can't Get Enough, Vol. 6 (1994)
- The Basketball Diaries (soundtrack) (1995)
- Put Your Tongue to the Rail: The Philly Comp for Catholic Children (Songs of the Jim Carroll Band) (1999)
- WBCN Naked 2000 (1999)
- Dawn of the Dead (2004)
- The Darwin Awards (2005)

== See also ==
- The Basketball Diaries
- James Parks Morton Interfaith Award
