= Paco de Onis =

American documentary film producer

Paco de Onis is an American documentary film producer. His film, State of Fear: The Truth about Terrorism, won the 2006 Overseas Press Club Award for "Best Reporting in Any Medium on Latin America".
