= When the Mountains Tremble =

- Directed by: Newton Thomas Sigel; Pamela Yates
- Produced by: Peter Kinoy
- Starring: Rigoberta Menchú; Susan Sarandon
- Cinematography: Newton Thomas Sigel
- Edited by: Peter Kinoy
- Music by: Rubén Blades
- Production company: Skylight Pictures
- Distributed by: New Yorker Films
- Release date: 1983
- Running time: 83 minutes
- Country: United States

When The Mountains Tremble is a 1983 documentary film produced by Skylight Pictures about the war between the Guatemalan Military and the Mayan Indigenous population of Guatemala.

Footage from this film was used as forensic evidence in the Guatemalan court for crimes against humanity, in the genocide case against Efraín Ríos Montt.

The film centers on the experiences of Nobel Prize winner Rigoberta Menchú, a Quiché indigenous woman who won the Nobel Peace Prize in 1992, nine years after the film came out. When The Mountains Tremble won the Special Jury Award at the Sundance Film Festival, the Blue Ribbon Award at the American Film Festival, and the Grand Coral Award/Best North American Documentary at the Havana Film Festival. A follow-up film was released in 2011, titled Granito: How to Nail a Dictator.

== 20th Anniversary ==
In 2004, When the Mountains Tremble was digitally remastered to commemorate its 20th anniversary. The special edition released is updated after Menchú was awarded the Nobel Peace Prize and includes a filmmaker commentary as well as a never-before-seen introduction from Susan Sarandon and an illuminating epilogue reflecting on the country's events a decade later. DVD Features: Filmmaker Commentary from Pamela Yates Newton Thomas Sigel and Editor Peter Kinoy; Never-Before-Seen Introduction by Susan Sarandon; Epilogue featuring Rigoberta Menchú; Filmmaker Biographies; Interactive Menus; Scene Selection.

In 2014, Yates reported that an investigation confirmed a significant mistake in the documentary, which had blamed the army for a village massacre that had actually been carried out by the Guerrilla Army of the Poor (EGP). She stated: "We intend to make a correction that will clarify what happened in this scene in both When the Mountains Tremble and Granito. The filmmakers thought they had filmed the aftermath of an army massacre in Chajul, but it was actually a different incident in Batzul, where guerrillas had executed 17 members of a village patrol organized by the army.
