= The Basketball Diaries (film) =

1995 film by Scott Kalvert

- Theatrical release poster
- Directed by: Scott Kalvert
- Screenplay by: Bryan Goluboff
- Based on: The Basketball Diaries by Jim Carroll
- Produced by: Liz Heller; John Bard Manulis
- Starring: Leonardo DiCaprio; Bruno Kirby; Lorraine Bracco; Ernie Hudson; Patrick McGaw; James Madio; Michael Imperioli; Mark Wahlberg
- Cinematography: David Phillips
- Edited by: Dana Congdon
- Music by: Graeme Revell
- Production company: Island Pictures
- Distributed by: New Line Cinema
- Release dates: January 27, 1995 (Sundance); April 21, 1995 (United States)
- Running time: 102 minutes
- Country: United States
- Language: English
- Box office: $2.4 million

The Basketball Diaries is a 1995 American biographical crime drama film. The film was directed by Scott Kalvert in his feature directorial debut. Based on an autobiographical novel of the same name written by Jim Carroll, it tells the story of Carroll's teenage years as a promising high school basketball player and writer who develops an addiction to heroin. Distributed by New Line Cinema, The Basketball Diaries stars Leonardo DiCaprio as Carroll, with Bruno Kirby, Lorraine Bracco, Ernie Hudson, Patrick McGaw, James Madio, Michael Imperioli and Mark Wahlberg in supporting roles.

The Basketball Diaries premiered at the Sundance Film Festival on January 27, 1995. It was widely released in theaters by New Line Cinema on April 21, 1995, receiving mixed reviews and grossing $2.4 million at the box office.

== Plot ==
Teenager Jim Carroll is a drug-addicted high school basketball player who regularly gets into mischief with his friends Pedro, Mickey and Neutron on the streets of New York City and at school. Outside of basketball, Jim shows an artistic interest in writing, keeping his work in a journal while expressing his thoughts and creating poetry.

Jim's best friend, Bobby, is dying of leukemia, and Jim frequently visits him in the hospital. After Bobby dies, Jim and his friends attend his funeral. Following the funeral, Jim and his friends go to a basketball court and reminisce about Bobby's life. Depressed over Bobby's death, Jim begins to use heroin.

At basketball practice, Jim's coach sees him in the locker room taking a break to get high. The coach gropes Jim and offers to pay him for sex, but Jim forcefully declines his advances. As Jim's frustrations with school and life grow with time, he imagines shooting his classmates. The next day, before a game, Jim, Pedro and Mickey take pills from Pedro's hat, hoping they are stimulants. Neutron refuses the pills and confronts Jim about his growing drug habit. The pills are downers, and they cause the boys to perform disastrously during the game. Father McNulty, who notices the boys engaging in drug use, tells Jim and Mickey that they are suspended for a week, while Swifty tells Jim he is now banned from playing basketball for his school again. In response, Jim and Mickey drop out of school, while Neutron remains.

After exposing his stash of drugs, Jim's religious mother disowns him and puts him out of their apartment. Jim, Mickey and Pedro become homeless addicts who live only for their next score. At one point, they break into a candy shop to steal money, and Mickey takes a gun he finds in the cash register. Hearing sirens, Jim and Mickey escape, but Pedro--too high and hung over to understand the situation--is left behind and arrested. Jim continues a desperate life of shady dealings and getting high with Mickey. In the winter, Jim passes out in the snow while high on heroin. Jim's friend Reggie, who has been in a similar situation, sympathizes with Jim over his predicament. Reggie finds Jim, takes him to his apartment, and forces him to painfully abstain and detox. But Jim relapses, and he takes money from Reggie for more drugs before leaving.

Back on the street, Jim is desperate for more drugs. He resorts to prostituting himself in a public restroom. Jim and Mickey buy heroin, only to discover that the dealer has ripped them off. Enraged, Mickey corners the dealer on the roof of an apartment building and accidentally pushes him off the roof to his death. Mickey tries to escape, but is beaten by a gang and arrested. He is tried as an adult and convicted.

After escaping the crime scene, Jim returns to his mother's apartment and begs her for money. Although she is tempted to give in to Jim's begging, she reluctantly reports him to the police instead. Jim cries uncontrollably before two police officers arrive and drag him into custody. Jim is convicted and sentenced to six months' incarceration at Rikers Island for assault, robbery, resisting arrest, and possession of narcotics. While in prison, Jim gets off drugs and spends much of his time writing in a diary.

Six months later, Jim approaches a stage door to give a poetry reading. He encounters Pedro, who has been released from reform school. Pedro offers him a bag of drugs, which Jim refuses. Jim recites his work before an audience and receives applause.

== Cast ==
- Leonardo DiCaprio as Jim Carroll
- Lorraine Bracco as Mrs. Carroll, Jim's mother
- Marilyn Sokol as Chanting Woman
- James Madio as Pedro, Jim's friend
- Patrick McGaw as Neutron, Jim's friend
- Mark Wahlberg as Mickey, Jim's friend
- Roy Cooper as Father McNulty
- Bruno Kirby as Swifty
- Alexander Chaplin as Bobo
- Juliette Lewis as Diane Moody
- Michael Imperioli as Bobby, Jim's friend who is dying of leukemia
- Michael Rapaport as Skinhead
- Ernie Hudson as Reggie
- Manny Alfaro as Manny
- Cynthia Daniel as Winkie
- Brittany Daniel as Blinkie
- Jim Carroll as Frankie Pinewater
- Ben Jorgensen as Tommy

== Reception ==
On review aggregator website Rotten Tomatoes, the film holds an approval rating of 46%, based on 41 reviews, with an average rating of 5.3/10. The websites critical consensus states: "In spite of its young leading man's heroic efforts to hold it all together, a muddled message prevents The Basketball Diaries from compelling as a cautionary tale." Metacritic gave the movie a score of 46, based on 19 reviews, indicating "mixed or average" reviews.

Roger Ebert of the Chicago Sun-Times gave the film two stars out of four. Ebert remarked, "At the end, Jim is seen going in through a 'stage door' and then we hear him telling the story of his descent and recovery. We can't tell if this is supposed to be genuine testimony or a performance. That's the problem with the whole movie."

== Lawsuits ==
The film became controversial in the aftermath of the 1997 Heath High School shooting and the 1999 Columbine High School massacre. Critics noted similarities between those shooting attacks and a dream sequence in the film in which the protagonist (Leonardo DiCaprio) wears a black trenchcoat and shoots six students in his school classroom. The film has been named in lawsuits brought by the relatives of murder victims. In 1999, activist Jack Thompson filed a $33 million lawsuit claiming that the film's plot (as well as two internet pornography sites, several computer game companies, and makers and distributors of the 1994 film Natural Born Killers) caused the Heath High School shooting. The case was dismissed in 2001.

== Soundtrack ==
The Basketball Diaries soundtrack was released in 1995 by PolyGram to accompany the film, featuring songs from The Doors, Pearl Jam, Soundgarden, The Cult and PJ Harvey. AllMusic rated it three stars out of five.

No.	Title	Writer(s)	Artist	Length
1.	"Catholic Boy"	Jim Carroll	Jim Carroll with Pearl Jam	3:05
2.	"Devil's Toe"	Jim Carroll	Graeme Revell with Jim Carroll	0:56
3.	"Down by the Water"	P J Harvey	P J Harvey	3:14
4.	"What a Life!"	Glyn "Bigga" Bush, Richard "DJ Dick" Whittingham, Rob McKenzie	Rockers Hi-Fi	4:02
5.	"I Am Alone"	Jim Carroll	Graeme Revell with Jim Carroll	1:33
6.	"People Who Died"	Jim Carroll, Brian Linsley, Steve Linsley, Terrell Winn, Wayne Woods	The Jim Carroll Band	5:00
7.	"Riders on the Storm"	Jim Morrison, John Densmore, Robby Krieger, Ray Manzarek	The Doors	6:56
8.	"Dizzy"	Ty Willman, Mari Ann Braeden, Danny K, Bob "Mink" Martin, Steve Ross	Green Apple Quick Step	3:10
9.	"It's Been Hard"	Jim Carroll	Graeme Revell with Jim Carroll	0:53
10.	"Coming Right Along"	Jon Auer, Ken Stringfellow	The Posies	6:17
11.	"Strawberry Wine"	Salvadore Poe, Adam Flax	Massive Internal Complications	3:59
12.	"Star"	Ian Astbury, Billy Duffy	The Cult	5:00
13.	"Dream Massacre"		Graeme Revell	1:23
14.	"I've Been Down"	Flea	Flea	4:38
15.	"Blind Dogs"	Chris Cornell, Kim Thayil	Soundgarden	4:40

Not featured on CD
No.	Title	Writer(s)	Artist	Length
1.	"Dancing Barefoot"	Patti Smith, Ivan Kral	Johnette Napolitano
2.	"Watusi Latin Boogaloo"	Joey Altruda	The Joey Altruda Latin Explosion

== See also ==
- List of basketball films
- Ben Is Back
- Beautiful Boy
- Four Good Days
