= The Basketball Diaries (book) =

Book by Jim Carroll

- First edition
- Author: Jim Carroll
- Language: English
- Publisher: Tombouctou Press (Bolinas, California, U.S.)
- Publication date: 1978
- Publication place: United States
- Media type: Print (Paperback)
- Pages: 224 (Penguin, 1987)
- ISBN: 0-14-010018-0
- Dewey Decimal: 813/.54 19
- LC Class: PS3553.A7644 Z464 1988

The Basketball Diaries is a 1978 memoir written by author and musician Jim Carroll.

== Description ==
It is an edited collection of the diaries he kept between the ages of twelve and sixteen. Set in New York City, they detail his daily life, sexual experiences, high school basketball career, poetry compositions, the counterculture movement, and especially his addiction to heroin, which began when he was 13.

== Adaptation ==
The book was made into a film of the same name in 1995 starring Leonardo DiCaprio as Jim Carroll and Mark Wahlberg as Mickey. Roger Ebert noted in his 1995 review of the adaptation that Carroll's original memoir "struck a personal note, of a kid who despite his suffering tried to turn his experience into poetry".

== Sequels ==
Carroll followed up this memoir with a sequel of sorts called The Downtown Diaries which follows his relocation to California and his efforts to end his heroin addiction.

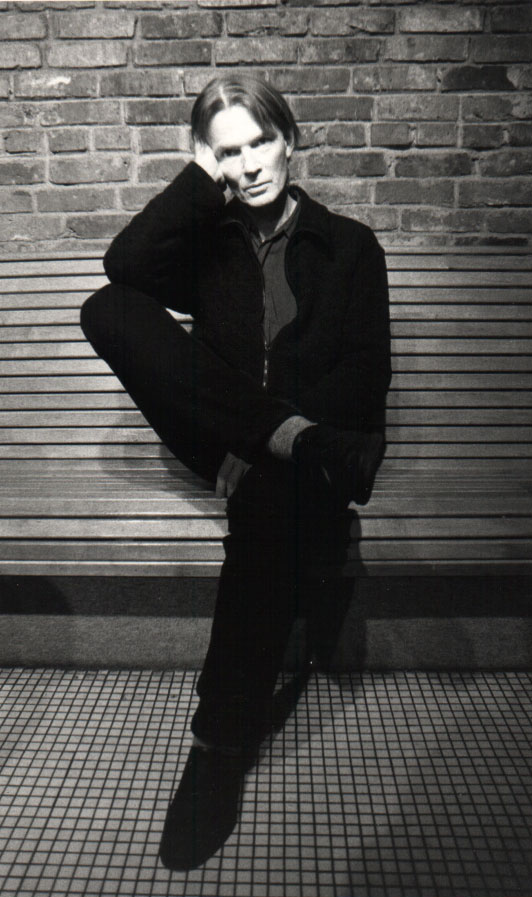
Jim Carroll in 2000.
