= Pamela Yates =

American film director

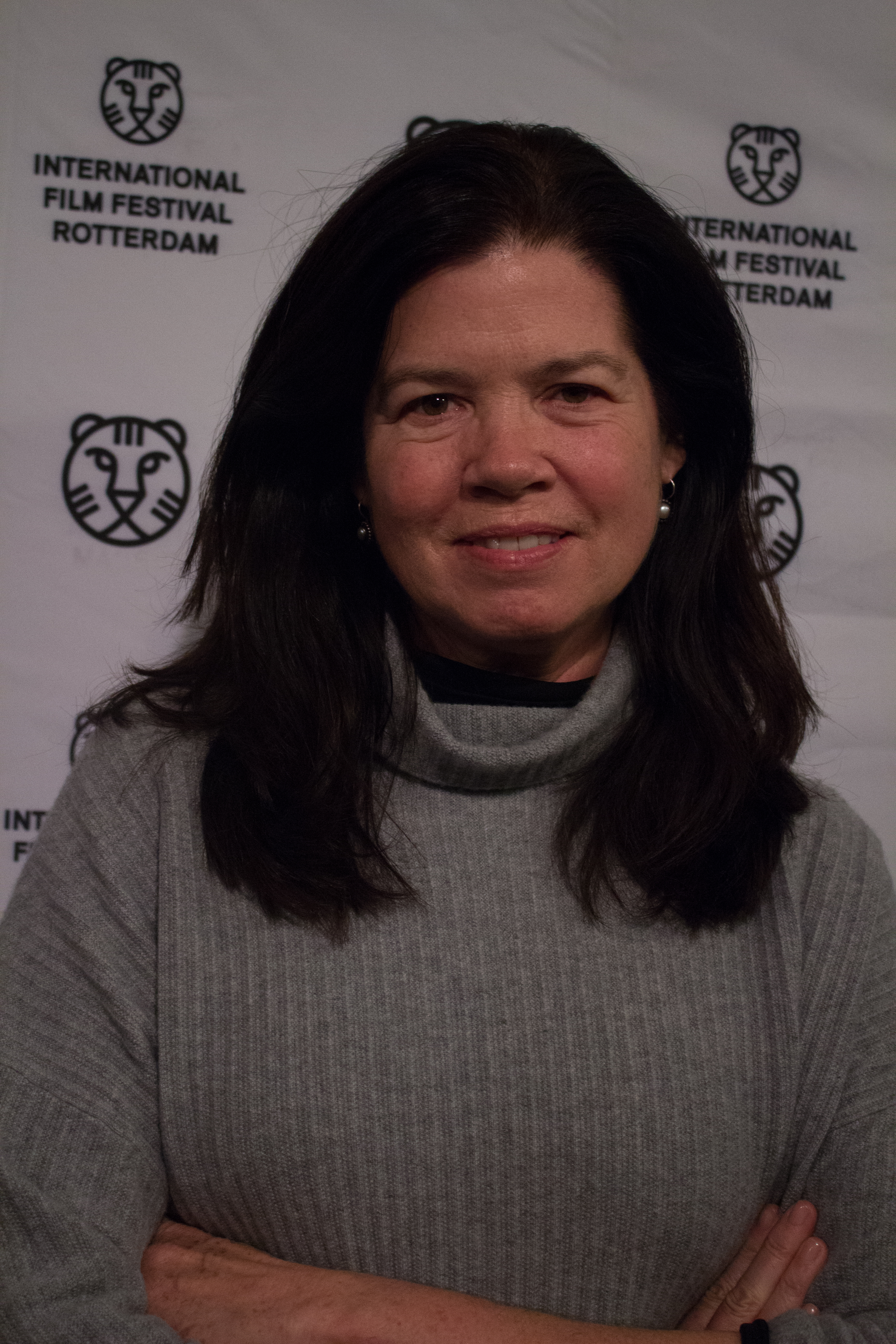
Pamela Yates at the international premiere of Rebel Citizen during the International Film Festival Rotterdam 2016

Pamela Yates is an American documentary filmmaker and human rights activist. She has directed films about war crimes, racism, and genocide in the United States and Latin America, often with emphasis on the legal responses.

== Biography ==
Pamela Yates was born and raised in the Appalachian coal-mining region of Pennsylvania but left at a young age to live in New York City. She earned a Bachelor's degree from the University of Massachusetts, Amherst in 1976.

She is a Guggenheim Fellow, the Director of the Sundance Award winning When the Mountains Tremble, the Producer of the Emmy Award- winning Loss of Innocence, and the Executive Producer of the Academy Award winning "Witness to War." She most recently directed the film Granito: How to Nail a Dictator, which served as key evidence in the Ríos Montt genocide trial in Guatemala. Previously Yates directed, The Reckoning: The Battle for the International Criminal Court," a feature-length film and educational initiative and State of Fear, a feature-length documentary that tells the epic story of Peru's 20-year war on terror based on the findings of the Peruvian Truth and Reconciliation Commission. Pamela is a co-founder and partner of Skylight Pictures, a company committed to producing artistic, challenging and socially relevant independent media and media strategies on issues of human rights and the quest for justice.

== Work ==
Her 2006 film, State of Fear: The Truth about Terrorism, about the findings of Truth and Reconciliation Commission concerning the internal conflict in Peru, was translated into 44 languages and broadcast in 157 countries.

The Reckoning: The Battle for the International Criminal Court, released in 2009, is about the work of the International Criminal Court. In 2010, Yates was nominated for two Emmys for it – Best Documentary Film and Outstanding Investigative Journalism in a Long Form Documentary. The Reckoning was nominated for a Grand Jury Prize at the Sundance Film Festival.

Her 2011 film, Granito: How to Nail a Dictator, is a sequel to When the Mountains Tremble. In it, Yates uses her archives to provide evidence for a war crimes tribunal set in Spain (using the concept of universal jurisdiction) in its efforts to prosecute the genocide in Guatemala. The film was an official selection included in the Premiere Documentary Section of the 2011 Sundance Film Festival, and was also nominated for an Emmy for Outstanding Investigative Journalism in a Long Form Documentary. Yates received a Guggenheim Fellowship for her work on the film, which served as key evidence in the Ríos Montt genocide trial in Guatemala. On May 3, 2015, the film won the White Camel award at the FiSahara.

== Accolades ==
Four of Yates' films — When the Mountains Tremble, Poverty Outlaw, Takeover, and Teatro! — were nominated for the Grand Jury Prize at the Sundance Film Festival, and When The Mountains Tremble won the award in 1984.

Her film, State of Fear: The Truth about Terrorism, won the 2006 Overseas Press Club Award for "Best Reporting in Any Medium on Latin America".

Awards and nominations for her 2011 Documentary, Granito: How to Nail A Dictator include: Official Selection, Sundance Film Festival, 2011; Emmy Nomination, Outstanding Investigative Journalism: Long Form, 2013; Opening Night Film, Human Rights Watch International Film Festival, 2011; Grand Prix for Best Creative Documentary, Paris International Human Rights Film Festival; Peace & Reconciliation Prize, The Geneva International Human Rights Festival, 2011 Jury Grand Prize, The Politics on Film Festival, 2011; Honorable Mention, Overseas Press Club Award; 2012 Founder's Award, Traverse City Film Festival, 2011

== Selected filmography ==
- Resurgence: The Movement for Equality vs. The Ku Klux Klan (1981)
- When the Mountains Tremble (1983)
- Nicaragua: Report from the Front (1983)
- Teatro! (1990)
- Takeover (1990)
- Poverty Outlaw (1997)
- Outriders (1999)
- Brotherhood of Hate (1999)
- Battle for Broad (2000)
- Cause for Murder (2002)
- Presumed Guilty: Tales of the Public Defenders (2002)
- State of Fear: The Truth about Terrorism (2005)
- Living Broke in Boom Times (2007)
- The Reckoning: The Battle for the International Criminal Court, (formerly The Court of Last Resort) (2008)
- Granito: How to Nail a Dictator (2011)
- Rebel Citizen (2015)
- 500 Years (2017)
- Borderland (2024)
