= Peter Kinoy =

American film director

Peter Kinoy is an American documentary filmmaker and film editor. Four of his films (Poverty Outlaw, Takeover, Teen Dreams and Teatro!) were nominated for the Grand Jury Prize at the Sundance Film Festival, and When the Mountains Tremble won the award in 1984. State of Fear: The Truth about Terrorism, which he co-wrote and edited, won the 2006 Overseas Press Club Award for "Best Reporting in Any Medium on Latin America". He co-wrote the 1986 documentary Witness to Apartheid, which was nominated for an Academy Award, with Sharon I. Sopher, the film's producer and director.

He is the son of Arthur Kinoy.
