= Hyacinth Chen Nursing School =

Nursing school in Mandeville, Jamaica

Coordinates: 18.0127°N 77.4967°W

Hyacinth Chen School of Nursing
- Type: Private
- Established: 2008
- Religious affiliation: Seventh-day Adventist Church
- President: Dr. Herbert J. Thompson
- Location: Mandeville, Manchester, Jamaica
- Website: www.ncu.edu.jm

The Hyacinth Chen School of Nursing is a private nursing school. It was officially opened on August 10, 2008, on a location directly across from the Northern Caribbean University campus across from NCU's Dental Centre located in Mandeville, Jamaica.

The school is owned by the Seventh-day Adventist Church in Jamaica. The school is being named in honour of Mrs. Hyacinth Chen, the mother of major donor, Michael Lee-Chin, Jamaican/Canadian businessman.

The school will hold 800 nursing students and will reduce Jamaica's nursing shortage.

It is a part of the Seventh-day Adventist education system, the world's second largest Christian school system.

== See also ==
- List of Seventh-day Adventist colleges and universities
- Seventh-day Adventist education
- Seventh-day Adventist Church
- Seventh-day Adventist theology
- History of the Seventh-day Adventist Church
- Adventist Colleges and Universities
- List of Seventh-day Adventist hospitals
- List of Seventh-day Adventist medical schools
- List of Seventh-day Adventist secondary schools
- Christian school
