= List of Seventh-day Adventist colleges and universities =

The following is a list of colleges, seminaries and universities owned and operated by the Seventh-day Adventist Church (with exceptions noted).

== Africa ==
- Cosendai Adventist University, Yaoundé, Cameroon
- Adventist University of Africa, Nairobi, Kenya
- Adventist University of Central Africa, Kigali, Rwanda
- Adventist University of West Congo, Kinshasa, Democratic Republic of the Congo
- Adventist University of Lukanga, Butembo, North Kivu, Democratic Republic of the Congo
- Adventist University of West Africa, Monrovia, Liberia
- Angola Adventist University, Mbongo, Angola
- Adventist College of Education, Asokore, Ghana
- Babcock University, Ogun State, Nigeria
- Bugema University, Kampala, Uganda
- Chegutu Adventist University, Zimbabwe
- Clifford University, Abia State, Nigeria
- Ethiopian Adventist College, Ethiopia
- Adventist University of Goma, Goma, Democratic Republic of the Congo
- Helderberg College of Higher Education, Somerset West, South Africa
- Kamagambo Adventist College, Kisii, Kenya
- Kanye Seventh-day Adventist College of Nursing, Kanye, Botswana
- Malawi Adventist University (formerly Lakeview College), Ntcheu, Malawi
- Nyanchwa Adventist Teachers College, Kenya
- Philip Lemon University, Lubumbashi, Democratic Republic of the Congo
- Rusangu University, Monze, Zambia
- Solusi University, Bulawayo, Zimbabwe
- Université Adventiste Zurcher, Sambaina, Antsirabe, Madagascar
- University of Arusha, Arusha, Tanzania
- University of Eastern Africa, Baraton, Eldoret, Kenya
- Valley View University, Oyibi, Ghana

Not Church owned, but closely aligned with the Seventh-day Adventist Church:

- University of Lay Adventists of Kigali, Kigali, Rwanda
- Adeleke University, Osun State, Nigeria

== Europe ==
- Adventist University of France, France
- Hungarian Adventist Theological College, Hungary
- Adriatic Union College, Croatia
- Italian Adventist College Villa Aurora, Italy
- Romanian Adventus University from Cernica, Romania
- Newbold College of Higher Education, United Kingdom
- Romanian Adventist College of Health, Romania
- Romanian Adventist Nursing School, Romania
- Friedensau Adventist University, Germany
- The Polish College of Theology and Humanities, Poland
- Ukrainian Institute of Arts and Sciences, Ukraine

== Middle East ==
- Middle East University, Lebanon

== Euro-Asia Division ==
- Zaoksky Adventist University, Russia

== North America Division ==
- AdventHealth University, Orlando, Florida, United States
- Andrews University, Berrien Springs, Michigan, United States
- Burman University, Lacombe, Alberta, Canada
- Griggs University, Berrien Springs, Michigan, United States (University-level distance learning, merged with Andrews University in 2013)
- Kettering College, Kettering, Ohio, United States
- La Sierra University, Riverside, California, United States
- Loma Linda University, Loma Linda, California, United States
- Oakwood University, Huntsville, Alabama, United States
- Pacific Union College, Angwin, California, United States
- Southern Adventist University, Collegedale, Tennessee, United States
- Southwestern Adventist University, Keene, Texas, United States
- Union Adventist University, Lincoln, Nebraska, United States
- Walla Walla University, College Place, Washington, United States
- Washington Adventist University, Takoma Park, Maryland, United States

Not Church-owned, but closely aligned with the Seventh-day Adventist Church:

- Hartland College, a division of Hartland Institute, Rapidan, Virginia, United States
- Middle Tennessee School of Anesthesia, Madison, Tennessee, United States
- Ouachita Hills College, Amity, Arkansas, United States
- Weimar University, Weimar, California, United States
- Wildwood College, Wildwood, Georgia, United States

== Inter-America Division ==
- Venezuelan Adventist University, Venezuela
- Northern Caribbean University, Mandeville, Jamaica
- Antillean Adventist University, Mayagüez, Puerto Rico
- Central American Adventist University, Costa Rica
- Colombia Adventist University, Colombia
- Dominican Adventist University, Dominican Republic
- Instituto Universitario del Sureste, Yucatán, Mexico
- University of Montemorelos, Montemorelos, Nuevo León, Mexico
- Instituto Universitario del Sureste, Tabasco, Mexico
- University of Navojoa, Navojoa, Sonora, Mexico
- Herbert Fletcher University, Mayagüez, Puerto Rico
- Linda Vista University, Pueblo Nuevo, Chiapas, Mexico
- Adventist University of Haiti, Carrefour area of Port-au-Prince, Haiti
- University of the Southern Caribbean, Maracas Valley, Trinidad and Tobago

== South American Division ==
- São Paulo Adventist University Campus 1, Brazil
- São Paulo Adventist University Campus 2, Brazil
- São Paulo Adventist University Campus 3, Brazil
- Amazonia Adventist College, Brazil
- Northeast Brazil College, Brazil
- Minas Adventist College, Brazil
- Paraná Adventist College, Brazil
- Ecuador Adventist Technical Institute, Santo Domingo de los Tsáchilas, Ecuador
- Adventist Institute of Uruguay, Canelones, Uruguay
- Misiones Adventist College, Misiones, Argentina
- Bolivia Adventist University, Cochabamba, Bolivia
- Chile Adventist University, Chillan, Chile
- Adventist University of the Plata, Entre Ríos, Argentina
- Peruvian Union University Campus 1, Juliaca, Peru
- Peruvian Union University Campus 2, Lima, Peru
- Peruvian Union University Campus 3, Tarapoto, Peru

== Southern Asia Division ==
- Flaiz Adventist College, Narsapur, India
- Hume McHenry Memorial High School and Jr. College, Pune, India
- Helen Lowry College of Arts & Commerce, Aizawl, India
- Lakpahana Adventist College and Seminary, Sri Lanka
- Adventist International School, Sri Lanka
- Lowry Memorial College & Group of Institutions, Bengaluru, India
- METAS of Seventh-day Adventist Colleges, Surat, India
- Northeast Adventist University, Jowai, India
- Pakistan Adventist Seminary & College, Pakistan
- Roorkee Adventist College, Roorkee, India
- Seventh-day Adventist College of Education, Vellore, Tamil Nadu, India
- Spicer Adventist University, Pune, India
- Seventh-day Adventist College of Nursing, Ottapalam, Kerala, India
- Yangon Adventist Seminary, Yangon, Myanmar

== Southern Asia-Pacific Division ==
- Bangladesh Adventist Seminary School and College, Gazipur, Dhaka, Bangladesh
- Bangladesh Adventist Nursing College, Gazipur, Dhaka, Bangladesh
- Adventist College of Nursing and Health Sciences, Penang, Malaysia
- Adventist International Institute of Advanced Studies, Lalaan, Silang, Cavite, Philippines
- Adventist University of the Philippines, Puting Kahoy, Silang, Cavite, Philippines
- Asia-Pacific International University (formerly Mission College), Muak Lek, Saraburi Province, Thailand
- Central Philippine Adventist College, Murcia, Negros Occidental, Philippines
- Indonesian Adventist University, Parongpong, Bandung, Indonesia
- Manila Adventist College, Pasay, Philippines
- McNeilus Maranatha Christian College, Kalaymyo, Myanmar
- Adventist Medical Center College – Iligan, Inc., Iligan City, Lanao del Norte, Philippines
- Mountain View College, Valencia City, Bukidnon, Philippines
- Myanmar Union Adventist Seminary, Myaungmya, Myanmar
- Naga View Adventist College, Panicuason, Naga City, Camarines Sur, Philippines
- Northeast Luzon Adventist College, Mabini, Alicia, Isabela, Philippines
- Northern Luzon Adventist College, Artacho, Sison, Pangasinan, Philippines
- Palawan Adventist Medical Center and Colleges, Puerto Princesa, Palawan, Philippines
- Philippine Advent College, Magsaysay, Sindangan, Zamboanga del Norte, Philippines
- South Philippine Adventist College, Camanchiles, Matanao, Davao del Sur, Philippines
- Surya Nusantara Adventist College, Pematang Siantar, North Sumatra, Indonesia
- Klabat University, Airmadidi, North Sulawesi, Indonesia

== Northern Asia-Pacific Division ==
- Hong Kong Adventist College, Sai Kung, New Territories, Hong Kong, China
- Sahmyook Bogeon Daehakgyo (Sahmyook Health University College), South Korea
- Sahmyook University, Nowon-gu, Seoul, South Korea
- Saniku Gakuin College, Isumi-gun, Chiba-ken, Japan
- Taiwan Adventist College, Nantou County, Taiwan

== South Pacific Division ==
- Avondale University, Cooranbong, Lake Macquarie, New South Wales, Australia
- Fulton Adventist University College, Nadi, Fiji
- Mamarapha College, Karragullen, Western Australia, Australia
- Pacific Adventist University, Port Moresby, Papua New Guinea
- Sonoma Adventist College, Kokopo, East New Britain, Papua New Guinea
- Atoifi Adventist College of Nursing, Malaita Province, Solomon Islands.

== See also ==
- Christian school
- List of Seventh-day Adventist hospitals
- List of Seventh-day Adventist secondary schools
- Seventh-day Adventist Church

== Sources ==
Much of this information (particularly the location information) was taken from sites of the Seventh-day Adventist Church, such as the site below.

- List of Adventist colleges and universities by divisions of the Adventist Church
- Search for a school nearby
- Adventist Directory
