= Sonoma Adventist College =

Coordinates: 4.4271°S 152.2397°E

- Motto: To know, To Love, To serve
- Type: Private
- Established: 1968
- Affiliations: Seventh-day Adventist Church
- Academic affiliations: Pacific Adventist University
- Principal: Dr Isako Esekia
- Dean: Pr Wellington Sanan (Men); Martha Banas(Women) Head Cleaner Mr Desmond Amua Assistant head of labourer-morris David Bogew
- Deputy principal: Malachi Param
- Faculty: 56
- Administrative staff: 45
- Students: 700
- Location: Kokopo, Papua New Guinea
- Website: www.sonoma.ac.pg

Sonoma Adventist College is a co-educational tertiary institution situated in Kokopo in Papua New Guinea. It is operated by the Seventh-day Adventist Church and is accredited by the Adventist Accrediting Association.

It is a part of the Seventh-day Adventist education system, the world's second largest Christian school system.

== Academic divisions ==
The college is divided into the following divisions

- Agriculture
- Building construction
- Commerce
- Education
- Theology

== History ==
During the 1993 eruption of the Rabaul volcanoes, Sonoma was a registered refugee camp with over 2,000 extra people on campus. It was founded by Pr Alex Currie.

== See also ==
- List of Seventh-day Adventist colleges and universities
- Seventh-day Adventist education
- Seventh-day Adventist Church
- Seventh-day Adventist theology
- History of the Seventh-day Adventist Church
- Adventist Colleges and Universities
- List of Seventh-day Adventist medical schools
- List of Seventh-day Adventist secondary schools
- List of Seventh-day Adventist secondary and elementary schools
- List of Seventh-day Adventist hospitals
- Christian school
