= Malawi Adventist University =

Private Christian university in Ntcheu, Malawi

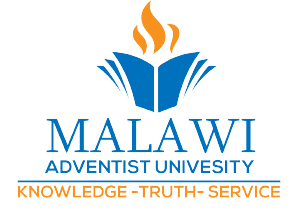
- Former name: Lakeview Seminary
- Motto: Knowledge. Truth. Service.
- Type: Private
- Established: 1969
- Religious affiliation: Seventh-day Adventist Church
- Chancellor: Pastor T. Y. Nyirenda
- Vice-Chancellor: Dr. Sharon Pittman
- Location: Ntcheu, Malawi; 13.9500°N 33.7000°E
- Campus: Lakeview and Malamulo
- Website: mau.ac.mw

Malawi Adventist University is a private Christian university in Ntcheu Malawi affiliated to the Seventh-day Adventist Church.

It is run by the Seventh-day Adventist Church, and is part of its system of higher education the Seventh-day Adventist education system, the world's second largest Christian school system.

== History ==
The Malawi Adventist University was established by an action of the Executive Committee of the Malawi Union Mission of the Seventh-day Adventist Church. As early as 1996, the action was taken to upgrade what was the Lakeview Seminary to a Junior College. It was envisaged to offer four year degree programmes of an already existing University. At that time the University of Eastern Africa, Baraton was the best candidate. In 1999 the Malawi Union Mission agreed to run the four year degree programmes.

In January 2000 the institution was opened as Malawi Adventist College. In the middle of 2006, the Malawi Union Officers, opened new negotiations with the University of Eastern Africa, Baraton for affiliation purposes. By May 2007 the negotiations had reached a remarkable stage leading to the signing of the Affiliation agreement between that University and the Malawi Adventist College on 27 May 2007. Later the Institution developed from a Junior College to an affiliated University.

These developments included Malamulo College of Health Sciences as a constituent college of the new University. For a long time, Malamulo College of Health Science had been offering certificate and Diploma programmes in Nursing and Midwifery, Lab Technology and Clinical Medicine. As soon as the college became part of the University, the process of developing degree programmes in the three fields of study was enhanced

It has three campuses: in Ntcheu district, Blantyre and the Malamulo campus in Thyolo.

== See also ==
- List of Seventh-day Adventist colleges and universities
- Seventh-day Adventist education
- Seventh-day Adventist Church
- Seventh-day Adventist theology
- History of the Seventh-day Adventist Church
- Adventist Colleges and Universities
- Adventist Colleges and Universities
- Education in Malawi
- List of universities in Malawi
