= Central American Adventist University =

- Type: Private
- Established: 1927
- Chancellor: Dr. Oscar Mario Camacho
- Location: Ceiba, Alajuela, Costa Rica
- Campus: 61 acres
- Website: www.unadeca.net

Central American Adventist University (Universidad Adventista de Centro America - UNADECA) is a Seventh-day Adventist co-educational university located in Alajuela, Costa Rica, and accredited by the Association of Private Universities of Central America and Panama (AUPRICA), the United Association of Private University Rectors of Costa Rica (UNIRE), and the Adventist Accrediting Association.

It is a part of the Seventh-day Adventist education system, the world's second largest Christian school system.

== History ==
Founded in 1925 in Las Cascadas, Panama, UNADECA moved to San Jose, Costa Rica in 1927. It later moved to Three Rivers in 1932 and finally to Alajuela in 1950. UNADECA offers undergraduate, graduate and doctoral (IATS) level degrees.

== Scandals ==
UNADECA was the subject of numerous investigations by Costa Rican officials for allegedly falsifying teacher credentials as well as accusations of bribing government officials and a former student initiated a lawsuit in 2005 that's related to it.

== See also ==
- List of Seventh-day Adventist colleges and universities
- Seventh-day Adventist education
- Seventh-day Adventist Church
- Seventh-day Adventist theology
- History of the Seventh-day Adventist Church
- Adventist Colleges and Universities
