= Adventist University of West Congo =

Christian school in the Democratic Republic of the Congo

- Type: Private
- Established: 2017
- Affiliations: Seventh-day Adventist Church
- Location: Kinshasa, Democratic Republic of the Congo
- Government Approved: 2017
- Website: []

Adventist University of West Congo is a private Christian co-educational school owned and operated by the Seventh-day Adventist Church in the Democratic Republic of the Congo. The university is located in Kinshasa, Democratic Republic of the Congo.

It is a part of the Seventh-day Adventist education system, the world's second largest Christian school system.

== History ==
The university was officially inaugurated in late January 2017. It was established to train ministerial students in the area and pursued accreditation through the Adventist Accrediting Association.

== See also ==
- List of Seventh-day Adventist colleges and universities
- Seventh-day Adventist education
- Seventh-day Adventist Church
- Seventh-day Adventist theology
- History of the Seventh-day Adventist Church
