= Adventist University of Goma =

University in the Democratic Republic of the Congo

- Type: Private
- Established: 2000; 26 years ago
- Affiliations: Seventh-day Adventist Church
- Location: Goma, North Kivu, Democratic Republic of the Congo; 1.6585620176988067°S 29.202750823700867°E
- Government Approved: 1999
- Website: www.uagom.com

Adventist University of Goma is a private Christian co-educational school owned and operated by the Seventh-day Adventist Church in the Democratic Republic of the Congo. The university is located in Goma, North Kivu, Democratic Republic of the Congo.

It is a part of the Seventh-day Adventist education system, the world's second largest Christian school system.

== See also ==
- List of Seventh-day Adventist colleges and universities
- Seventh-day Adventist education
- Seventh-day Adventist Church
- Seventh-day Adventist theology
- History of the Seventh-day Adventist Church
