= Clifford University =

Private Christian university in Nigeria

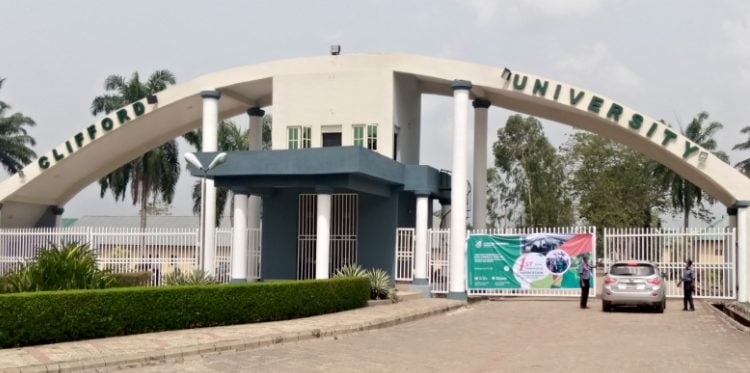
- Type: Private
- Established: 2013
- Affiliations: Seventh-day Adventist Church
- Vice-Chancellor: Professor Chimezie Omeonu
- Location: Ihie, Abia State, Nigeria; 5.2957°N 7.315°E
- Government Approved: 2016
- Website: clifforduni.edu.ng

Clifford University is a private Christian co-educational Nigerian university owned and operated by the Seventh-day Adventist Church in Nigeria. The university is located in Ihie, Abia State, Nigeria.

It is a part of the Seventh-day Adventist education system, the world's second-largest Christian school system.

== History ==
Clifford University is established on land that belonged to an Adventist school until it was seized by the government following the country's 1967–70 civil war. The government returned the land to the church in 2013. It is named after Jesse Clifford - a British missionary who brought Adventism to eastern Nigeria in 1923, serving in Nigeria for eight years.

== See also ==
- List of Seventh-day Adventist colleges and universities
- Seventh-day Adventist education
- Seventh-day Adventist Church
- Seventh-day Adventist theology
- History of the Seventh-day Adventist Church
