= Adventist University of West Africa =

Christian university in Liberia

- Type: Private
- Established: 2003; 23 years ago
- Affiliations: Seventh-day Adventist Church
- President: Dr. Emmanuel GM Kollie, PhD
- Location: Schieffelin Town, Margibi County, Liberia; 6.2121°N 10.5302°W
- Government Approved: 2013
- Website: www.auwa.edu.lr

Adventist University of West Africa is a private Christian co-educational school owned and operated by the Seventh-day Adventist Church in Liberia. The university is located in Schieffelin, a town located 35 km east of Monrovia, Liberia.

It is a part of the Seventh-day Adventist education system, the world's second largest Christian school system.

== History ==
The Adventists University of West Africa's Nursing School began classes in 2011 on the campus of Adventist High School. In 2012, ground was broken on the permanent site, the first student elections were held, and the nursing school moved into its permanent location. In 2018, the university's fourth class graduated, with the graduation's keynote speaker being Vice President Jewel Howard Taylor. In 2019, the nursing school was accredited by the Liberia Board of Nursing and Midwifery.

== See also ==
- List of Seventh-day Adventist colleges and universities
- Seventh-day Adventist education
- Seventh-day Adventist Church
- Seventh-day Adventist theology
- History of the Seventh-day Adventist Church
