= Dominican Adventist University =

- Type: Private
- Established: 1947
- President: Dr. José David Gómez González
- Location: Sonador Bonao, Monseñor Nouel Province, Dominican Republic
- Website: www.unad.edu.do

Dominican Adventist University (Universidad Adventista Dominicana - UNAD) is a Seventh-day Adventist co-educational university located in the Dominican Republic, and accredited by the Adventist Accrediting Association. UNAD offers undergraduate and graduate level degrees.

It is a part of the Seventh-day Adventist education system, the world's second largest Christian school system.

== History ==
The Dominican Adventist University, UNAD in Spanish, found its origins in the Dominican Adventist College, established in 1947, in Santo Domingo. By 1962 the school had 207 students, and in 1972, it was moved to Herrera, some 12 miles (19 kilometers) from the center of the capital, where it functioned as a boarding academy. Its facilities provide classrooms, offices, and dormitories. In 1975 it was moved to Bonao, some 44 miles (74 kilometers) from the capital, where it still operates. That same year the school began offering college-level courses in theology, education, and commerce, and a secretarial course. In 1976 the college received accreditation from the Inter-American Evaluating Commission.

In 1982, Dominican Adventist University was granted official recognition by the Government of the Dominican Republic with the presidential resolution, decree No.3482 on August 11, 1982. This official recognition allowed UNAD to grant undergraduate degree with the same validity as other Dominican colleges could do. Among the first bachelors offered were Business Administrations, Education, Theology and others. Currently this college is offering more than 15 undergraduate programs and three to four graduate programs.

== 1961 Revolution ==
The Dominican Adventist University, went through the revolution brought on by the May 30, 1961 assassination of dictator Trujillo who was shot and killed in his blue 1957 Chevrolet Bel Air which was ambushed on a road outside the Dominican capital. The ambush was plotted by a number of men in the army among them General Juan Tomás Díaz, Antonio de la Maza, Amado García Guerrero, and General Antonio Imbert Barrera who fought for control, but failed to take control and betrayed by General José ("Pupo") Román. The efforts of the Trujillo family to keep control of the country ultimately failed. A military uprising in November and American intervention set the final stage and ended the Trujillo regime. The United States sent a small fleet of ships and 1,800 marines to Dominican waters who ultimately came onshore to ensure law and order. The American Marines came onto the campus, as the battles were raging close by, and the Marines were welcomed by the teachers and students.

== Campus ==
The Dominican Adventist University (UNAD) is located in a 247-acre property in the community of Sonador, Bonao in the central area of the Dominican Republic. It takes about one and one-half hours from the capital, Santo Domingo, to reach the school by car.

In 2007, the university had 1,143 students and 105 college professors. As of 2013 is close to 4,000 students distributed in three campuses, Sonador, Santo Domingo, and San Pedro de Macoris. Currently, UNAD has more than 200 colleges professors which a significant number of them, hold graduate degrees in their area of teaching.

== Degree Courses ==
The college offers education in the following courses

1. Bachelor of Theology
2. Bachelor of Business Administrations,
3. Bachelor of Education
4. Bachelor of Marketing
5. Bachelor of Agriculture
6. Bachelor of Modern Languages (English & French)
7. Bachelor of Psychology
8. Bachelor of Science
9. Bachelor of Pre-School Education

=== Schedule ===
Classes

The official school year begins in August every year. The first semester runs from August to December, and the second semester runs from January to June. A half-semester of classes are offered during the summer months from June through August.

Graduation

There is one commencement service at the end of each school year in June.

== See also ==
- List of Seventh-day Adventist colleges and universities
- Seventh-day Adventist education
- Seventh-day Adventist Church
- Seventh-day Adventist theology
- History of the Seventh-day Adventist Church
- Adventist Colleges and Universities
- Christian school
