= HFU =

HFU may refer to

== Universities ==
- Hebei Finance University, in China
- Herbert Fletcher University, a Seventh-Day Adventist distance-learning institution
- Herman Finch University, now Rosalind Franklin University of Medicine and Science, in Illinois, United States
- Hochschule Furtwangen University, in Baden-Württemberg, Germany
- Holy Family University, in Philadelphia, Pennsylvania, United States
- Huafan University, in New Taipei, Taiwan

== Other usess ==
- HiFive Unleashed, a single-board computer
- Handball Federation of Ukraine
