= Seventh-day Adventist College of Education =

Seventh-day Adventist College of Education may refer to:

- Seventh-day Adventist College of Education (Ghana)
- Seventh-day Adventist College of Education (India)
