= Religion in Papua New Guinea =

Citizen population in Papua New Guinea by religion, based on the 2011 census
1. Catholicism (26.0%)
2. Lutheranism (18.4%)
3. Seventh-day Adventist (12.9%)
4. Pentecostal (10.4%)
5. United Church in Papua New Guinea (10.3%)
6. Evangelical Alliance Papua New Guinea (5.90%)
7. Anglican Church of Papua New Guinea (3.20%)
8. Baptist (2.80%)
9. Salvation Army (0.40%)
10. Kwato Church (0.20%)
11. Other Christian (5.10%)
12. Non Christian (1.40%)
13. Not stated (3.10%)
Religion in Papua New Guinea (2020)
1. Catholicism (25.7%)
2. Protestantism (47.8%)
3. Other Christian (21.5%)
4. Traditional (3.40%)
5. Other religion (1.00%)
6. No religion (0.70%)

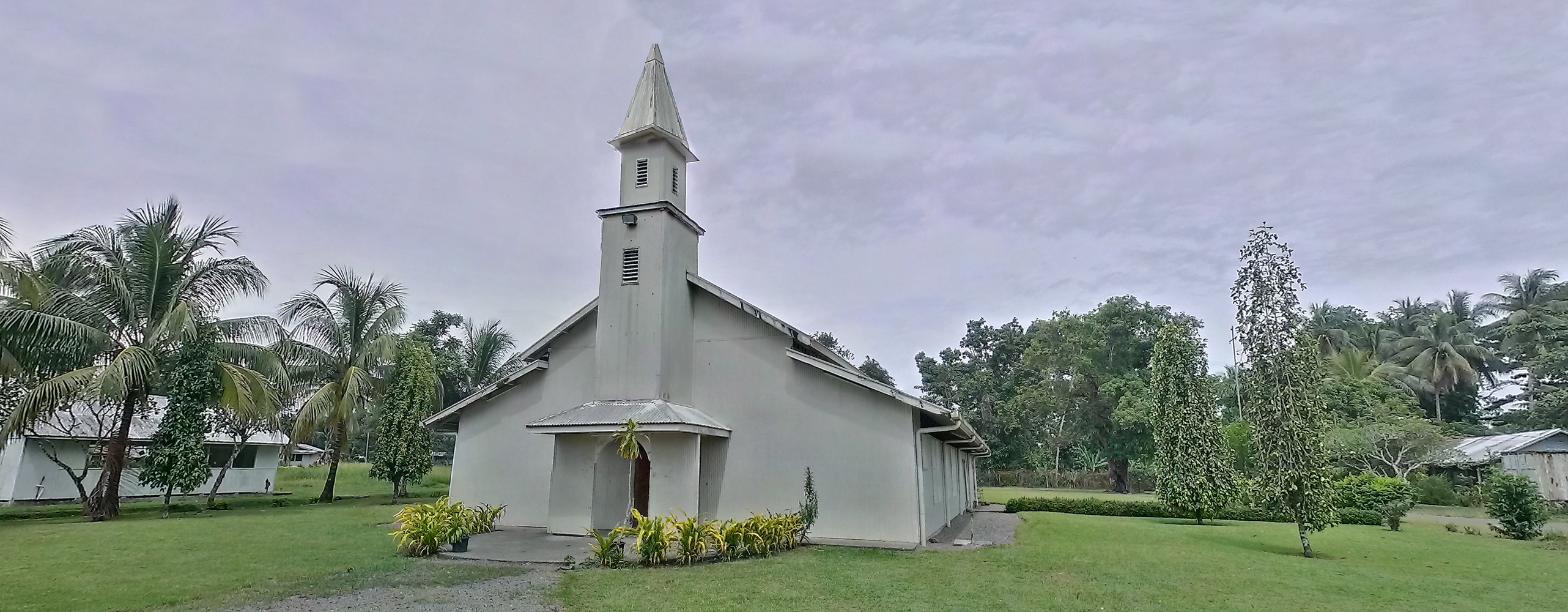
St Andrews Lutheran Church in Malahang, Morobe Province. Christianity is the main religion in Papua New Guinea

Religion in Papua New Guinea is dominated by various branches of Christianity, with traditional animism and ancestor worship often occurring less openly as another layer underneath or more openly side by side with Christianity. The Catholic Church has a plurality of the population. The courts, government, and general society uphold a constitutional right to freedom of speech, thought, and beliefs. A constitutional amendment in March 2025 recognised Papua New Guinea as a Christian country, with specific mention of "God, the Father; Jesus Christ, the Son; and Holy Spirit", and the Bible as a national symbol. The government openly partners with several Christian groups to provide services, and churches participate in local government bodies.

A large majority of Papua New Guineans identify themselves as members of a Christian church (96% in the decennial 2000 census); however, many combine their Christian faith with traditional indigenous practices, known as religious syncretism.

Other religions represented in the country include the Baháʼí Faith, Hinduism and Islam.

== Christianity ==
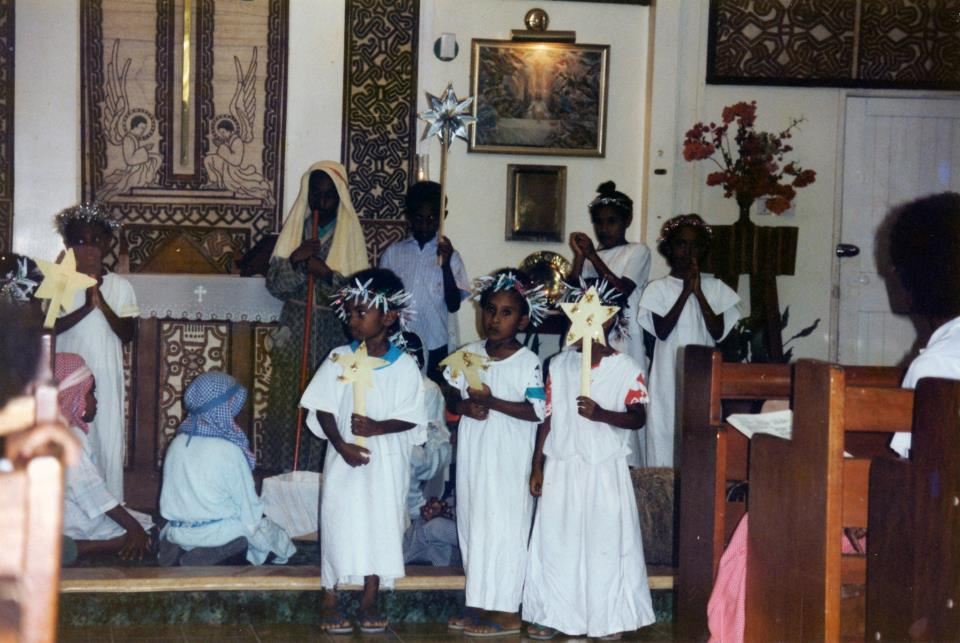
Christmas pageant in Port Moresby Anglican church mid-1990s.

The 2000 census demographics of Christian denominations in Papua New Guinea were as follows:

Christianity by denomination
Catholic Church	27.0%
Evangelical Lutheran Church of Papua New Guinea	19.5%
United Church in Papua New Guinea	11.5%
Seventh-day Adventist Church	10.0%
Pentecostal	8.6%
Evangelical Alliance (PNG)	5.2%
Anglican Church of Papua New Guinea	3.2%
Baptist	0.5%
Salvation Army	0.2%
Other Christian	10%
Jehovah’s Witnesses	0.4%
Church of Christ	0.4%

=== Parachurch organizations ===
The Summer Institute of Linguistics is a missionary institution drawing its support from conservative evangelical Protestant churches in the United States and, to a lesser extent, Australia; it translates the Bible into local languages and conducts extensive linguistic research.

Young Women's Christian Association.

Several Christian professional educational institutions have been opened in the country, such as Christian Leaders' Training College, Divine Word University, Pacific Adventist University and Sonoma Adventist College.

== Traditional religions ==
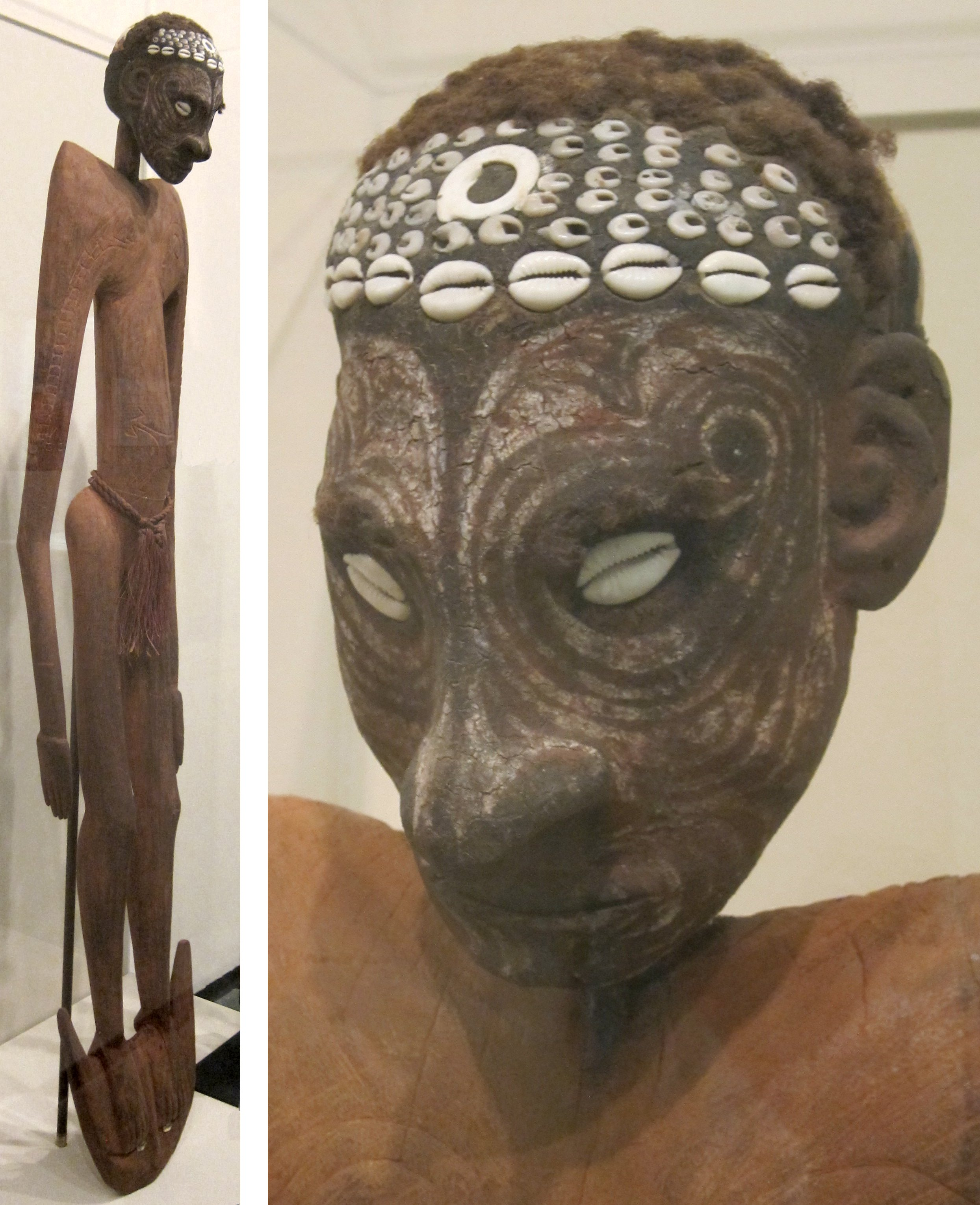
Ancestor figure with skull, Sepik, Iatmul people.

Traditional ethnic religions are often animist, and many have elements of ancestor worship, as well as tamam witches.

Religious syncretism is high, with many citizens combining their Christian faith with some traditional indigenous religious practices.

=== Asabano ===
The Asabano people of Papua New Guinea had traditional methods of treating human remains that varied based on the type of relationship the survivors planned to have with the deceased. These methods included corpse exposure with curation or disposal of bones, disposal of corpses in rivers, and even cannibalism. However, after their conversion to Christianity in the 1970s, the Asabano began burning or burying bone relics and commenced coffin burial in cemeteries.

== New religious movements ==
=== Cargo cults ===
Some cargo cults – the belief in a lost "Golden Age", which would be re-established when the dead ancestors returned – sprang up in Papua New Guinea during the 20th century, including the Taro Cult and the events known as the Vailala Madness in the Gulf of Papua, which, by the late 1920s, was no longer active.

=== Makasol ===
The Makasol (or "Wind Nation"), also known as Paliau movement, is neo-traditional Millenarianist counter-cultural religious and social movement in Papua New Guinea. Its base is in the Manus Province, a motherland of its founder, the prophet Paliau Maloat (d. 1991). He had served in the colonial police force, but became an opposition political activist, organized a movement, and had been arrested twice by the colonial authority. Later he also opposed the independent Papua governing elite.

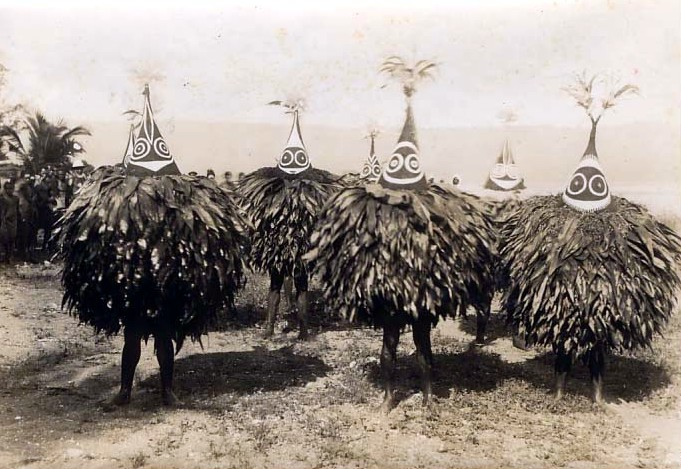
Duk-Duk dancers in the Gazelle Peninsula, New Britain, 1913.

The faith of the movement focuses on a new Holy Trinity - Wing, Wang and Wong. The new counter-cultural project is based on native values: local production for use; indigenous medical practices; new versions of traditional social institutions ("men's houses" and replacing the structure of local level governments).

=== Similar movements ===
There are similar indigenist movements to the Makasol. An example is the movement led by the remarkable "prophet" Yali in the Rai Coast District of northern Papua.

=== Baháʼí Faith ===
The Baháʼí Faith in Papua New Guinea began after 1916 with a mention by `Abdu'l-Bahá, then head of the religion, that Baháʼís should take the religion there. The first Baháʼís moved (referred to as "Baháʼí pioneering") to Papua New Guinea in 1954. With local converts the first Baháʼí Local Spiritual Assembly was elected in 1958. The first National Spiritual Assembly was then elected in 1969. According to the census of 2000, the number of Baháʼís was less than 21,000. The Association of Religion Data Archives (relying on World Christian Encyclopedia) estimated that Baháʼís made up 0.89% of the nation in 2020

Among its more well known members are the late Margaret Elias and the late Sirus Naraqi.

Margaret Elias was the daughter of the first Papua New Guinean woman on the national assembly, and the country's first woman lawyer (in the 1970s). She attended the 1995 Fourth World Conference on Women and was given an award in 1995 and 2002 for her many years in the public service, particularly in the national government. She went on to support various initiatives for education.

Sirus Naraqi lived and worked in Papua New Guinea from 1977 to 1979 and from 1983 to 1998, doing clinical medical work as well as teaching at the University of Papua New Guinea, where he was given an award in 1999 and had served as a member of the Continental Board of Counsellors in Australasia since 1985.

== Islam ==
Islam in Papua New Guinea counts for more than 10,000 followers, (most of whom are Sunni) mainly as a result of a recent spike in conversions. Despite being a dominant religion in neighbouring Indonesia, adherents of Islam make up a small segment of the population.

According to the 2000 census of Papua New Guinea, there are around 756 Muslims in the country, compared to 440 in 1990 census.

== Hinduism ==
According to ARDA, followers of Hinduism made up 0.01% of the population in 2020 (Shaivites and Saktists). This compared with 0.02% in 2015, and 0.01% in 2010.

== Religious freedom ==
The constitution of Papua New Guinea provides for freedom of religion and the right to practice religion freely. Religious groups are required to register with the government in order to hold property and obtain tax-exempt status. Foreign missionary groups are permitted to proselytize. Christian religious instruction in public schools is compulsory, although it is possible to opt out.

It was noted in 2022 that more people are being accused of sorcery (nearly 400 per year in the highland provinces). Almost half of allegations led to physical violence or property damage.

In the past, the Papuan government was opposed to formally recognizing Islam and its institutions. However, the government has reportedly threatened to ban Islam to the present day. There are reports of native Muslims experiencing discrimination and even violence from the Christian majority.

In 2026, Freedom House scored the country 4 out of 4 for religious freedom.

== Notable people ==
- Victor Schlatter (1980–2022), former nuclear scientist, church planter, missionary, and author
