= Kanye Seventh-day Adventist College of Nursing =

College in Kanye, Botswana

- Type: Private
- Established: 1947
- Affiliations: Seventh-day Adventist Church
- Location: Kanye, Botswana
- Website: www.ksdacon.ac.bw

Kanye Seventh-day Adventist College of Nursing is a private Christian co-educational college owned and operated by the Seventh-day Adventist Church in the Botswana. It is located in Kanye, Botswana.

It is a part of the Seventh-day Adventist education system, the world's second largest Christian school system.

== History ==
Kanye Seventh-day Adventist College of Nursing is a sister institution to Kanye Adventist Hospital. The hospital was established by Dr. Arthur Kretchmar in 1922 as a mission hospital. The hospital started training nurses in 1947. It offers a 3 years Higher Diploma in General Nursing in association with the University of Botswana and also offers post graduate diplomas in Family Nurse Practition (FNP) and Nursing Midwifery. The school has been in the process of introducing a degree in Public health.

== See also ==
- List of Seventh-day Adventist colleges and universities
- Seventh-day Adventist education
- Seventh-day Adventist Church
- Seventh-day Adventist theology
- History of the Seventh-day Adventist Church
