= Indonesian Adventist University =

Indonesian university

Universitas Advent Indonesia
- Universitas Advent Indonesia
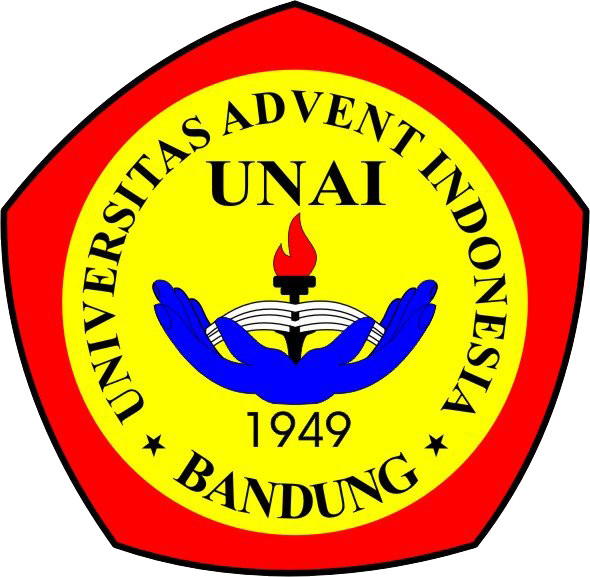
- Logo of Universitas Advent Indonesia
- Former names: Opleiding School Der Advent Zending (1929-1942); Indonesia Union Seminary (1948-1960); Adventist College of Indonesia (1960-1970); Adventist Theological Teaching Institute (1971-1980); Bandung Adventist University (1981-1982)
- Motto: Quality Christian Education
- Type: Private
- Established: 1949; 77 years ago
- Founders: H. Eelsing, Alvin M. Bartlett
- Religious affiliation: Seventh-day Adventist Church
- Rector: Dr. Milton T. Pardosi, M.A.R.
- Location: Kolonel Masturi No.288, Mailbox 40559, Bandung, West Java, Indonesia; 6°48′07″S 107°34′43″E
- Colors: Blue Sky
- Nickname: UNAI
- Website: https://unai.edu
- Location within Indonesia

Universitas Advent Indonesia also known as UNAI, is a private coeducational Christian university in Bandung, West Java in Indonesia. It is operated by the Seventh-day Adventist church.

It is a part of the Seventh-day Adventist education system, the world's second largest Christian school system.

== History ==
The school was opened in 1929. The Second World War forced the school to close in 1942. The school reopened in 1948 after the Second World War ended.

== Academic divisions ==
The university comprises the following Faculties and Programs

Faculty of Mathematics and Natural Sciences

1. Bachelor's Degree in Biology
2. Bachelor's Degree in Pharmacy

Faculty of Economic

1. Bachelor's Degree in Accounting
2. Bachelor's Degree in Management
3. Bachelor's Degree in Digital Business
4. Master's Degree in Management

Faculty of Teacher Training and Education

1. Bachelor of English Education
2. Bachelor of Mathematics Education

Faculty of Nursing

1. Diploma III Nursing
2. Bachelor's Degree of Nursing
3. Master's Degree of Nursing
4. Nursing Profession

Faculty of Philosophy

1. Bachelor's Degree of Philosophy
2. Master's Degree of Philosophy

== See also ==
- List of Seventh-day Adventist colleges and universities
- Seventh-day Adventist education
- Seventh-day Adventist theology
- History of the Seventh-day Adventist Church
