= METAS of Seventh-day Adventist Colleges =

METAS ADVENTIST COLLEGE
- Type: Private
- Established: 1998
- President: Dr. Eliah Srikakolli
- Location: Surat, Gujarat, India
- Website: metasofsda.in

METAS (Medical Educational Trust Association, Surat) operates as many as 3 boarding and 2 day schools, colleges, and 3 healthcare institutions across India. Courses of study include, but are not limited to: Nursing, Allied Health Professions, Business and Computer Science. The system started in 1923 with the founding of METAS Adventist Hospital, Surat a simple dispensary by missionary Pastor O. W. Lange.

METAS is a part of the Seventh-day Adventist education system, the world's second largest Christian school system.

== History ==
METAS Adventist College was established in Surat in 1998. The school, college and hospital were operated as separate units and were brought together under a common umbrella in order to cement the fragmented areas and build a solid platform for growth and development under the name Metas.

== See also ==
- List of Seventh-day Adventist colleges and universities
- Seventh-day Adventist education
- Seventh-day Adventist Church
- Seventh-day Adventist theology
- History of the Seventh-day Adventist Church
- Adventist Colleges and Universities
