= Bolivia Adventist University =

- Universidad Adventista de Bolivia
- Established: 1931; 95 years ago
- Affiliations: Seventh-day Adventist Church
- Chairman: Roberto O. Gullon
- President: Mateo Salvador
- Location: Cochabamba, Bolivia; 17.385901°S 66.315465°W
- Website: www.uab.edu.bo

Bolivia Adventist University (Spanish: Universidad Adventista de Bolivia), or UAB, is a private coeducational Christian university in the city of Cochabamba. The university is affiliated to the Seventh-day Adventist Church and offers degrees in six major fields: Theology, Health Sciences, Nursing, Education, Economic and Administrative Sciences (Business, etc.), and Engineering. UAB is the only Adventist university in Bolivia, but is one of ten such establishments in South America. It is a part of the Seventh-day Adventist education system, the world's second largest Christian school system.

== See also ==
- List of Seventh-day Adventist colleges and universities
- Seventh-day Adventist education
- Seventh-day Adventist Church
- Seventh-day Adventist theology
- History of the Seventh-day Adventist Church
- Adventist Colleges and Universities
- Christian school
