= Colombia Adventist University =

University in Medellín, Colombia

Colombia Adventist University Corporation
- Type: Private
- Established: 1937
- Rector: Dr. Abraham Arturo Acosta Bustillo
- Location: Medellín, Colombia
- Campus: 22 acres
- Website: www.unac.edu.co

Colombia Adventist University Corporation (Spanish: Corporacion Universitaria Adventista - UNAC) is a Seventh-day Adventist co-educational university located in Medellín, Colombia, and accredited by the Adventist Accrediting Association.

It is a part of the Seventh-day Adventist education system, the world's second largest Christian school system.

== History ==
Founded in 1937 as Industrial College Coloveno, it later became Colombo-Venezuelan Institute in 1950, and Colombia Adventist University in 1981. UNAC offers undergraduate and graduate doctoral level degrees.

== See also ==
- List of Seventh-day Adventist colleges and universities
- Seventh-day Adventist education
- Seventh-day Adventist Church
- Seventh-day Adventist theology
- History of the Seventh-day Adventist Church
- Adventist Colleges and Universities
