= Newbold College of Higher Education =

College in Binfield, Berkshire, UK

Coordinates: 51.4248°N 0.7860°W

- Former name: Duncombe Hall College
- Motto: Life Changing - Faith Affirming
- Type: Private
- Established: 1901
- Affiliations: Seventh-day Adventist
- Principal: Dr Dan Serb
- Faculty: 23
- Administrative staff: 30
- Students: 101
- Location: Binfield, Berkshire, England
- Campus: Rural
- Newspaper: The Newboldian
- Website: www.newbold.ac.uk

Newbold College of Higher Education is a member of the worldwide network of Seventh-day Adventist colleges and universities and attracts students from over 60 countries. It is a part of the Seventh-day Adventist education system, the world's second largest Christian school system.

Founded in 1901 as Duncombe Hall College in London, in 1945 it moved to Binfield in Berkshire, approximately 40 miles (64 km) west of London, with the purchase of Moor Close, around which the main campus has grown. The college offers courses in Theology, Business Management and Humanities for students pursuing a combination of studies in Business Studies, English Literature, History, Media Studies, Fine Arts, Psychology and/or Religion. A range of one year programmes are available, including Gap Year, University Year in England, and a British Heritage suite of modules as part of the Adventist Colleges Abroad (ACA) programme. The college offers an English programme for speakers of other Languages (ESOL).

The college is an international member of the Council of Independent Colleges and an international affiliate of the Council for Christian Colleges and Universities.

== History ==
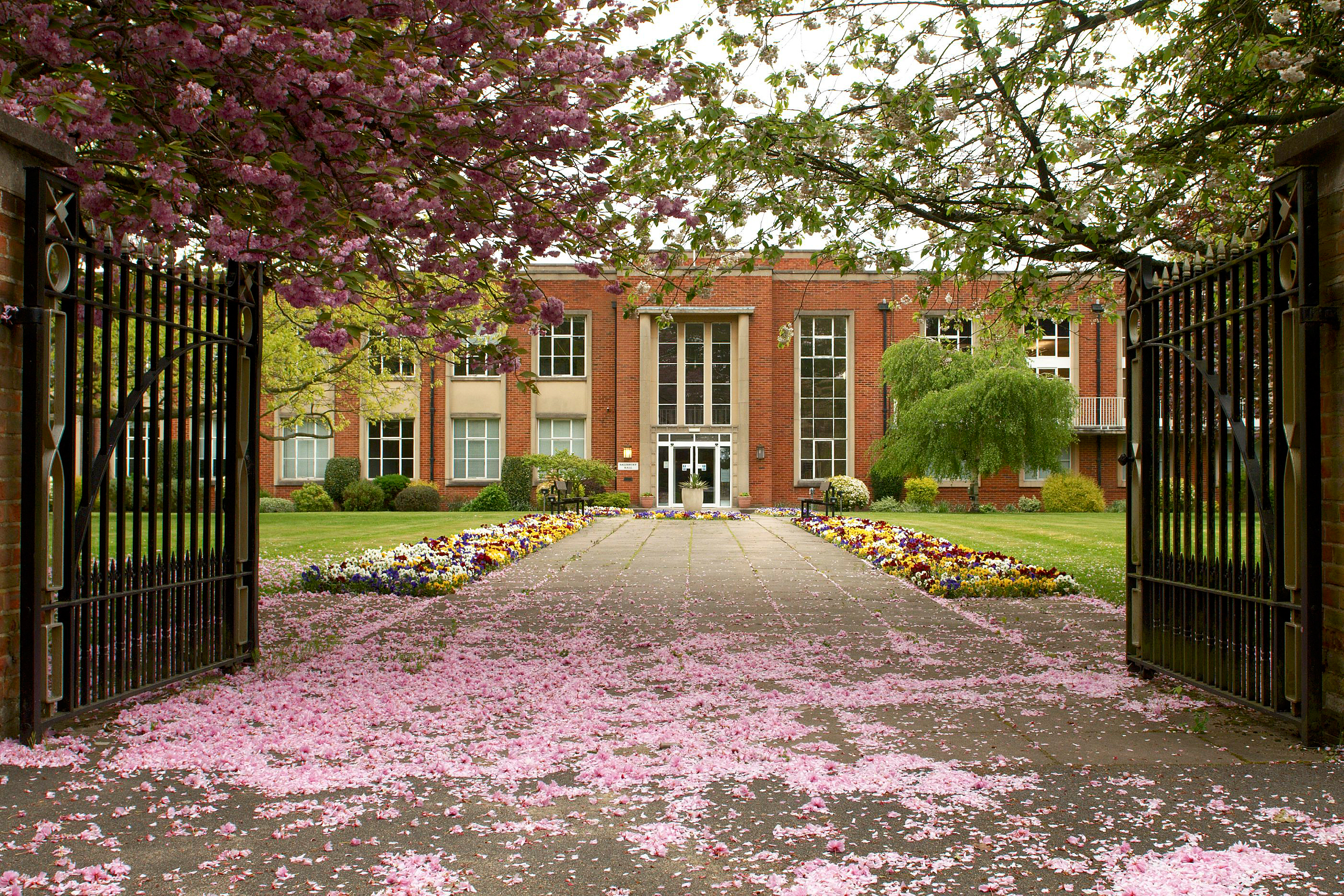
Salisbury Hall, the main administrative building at Newbold College of Higher Education

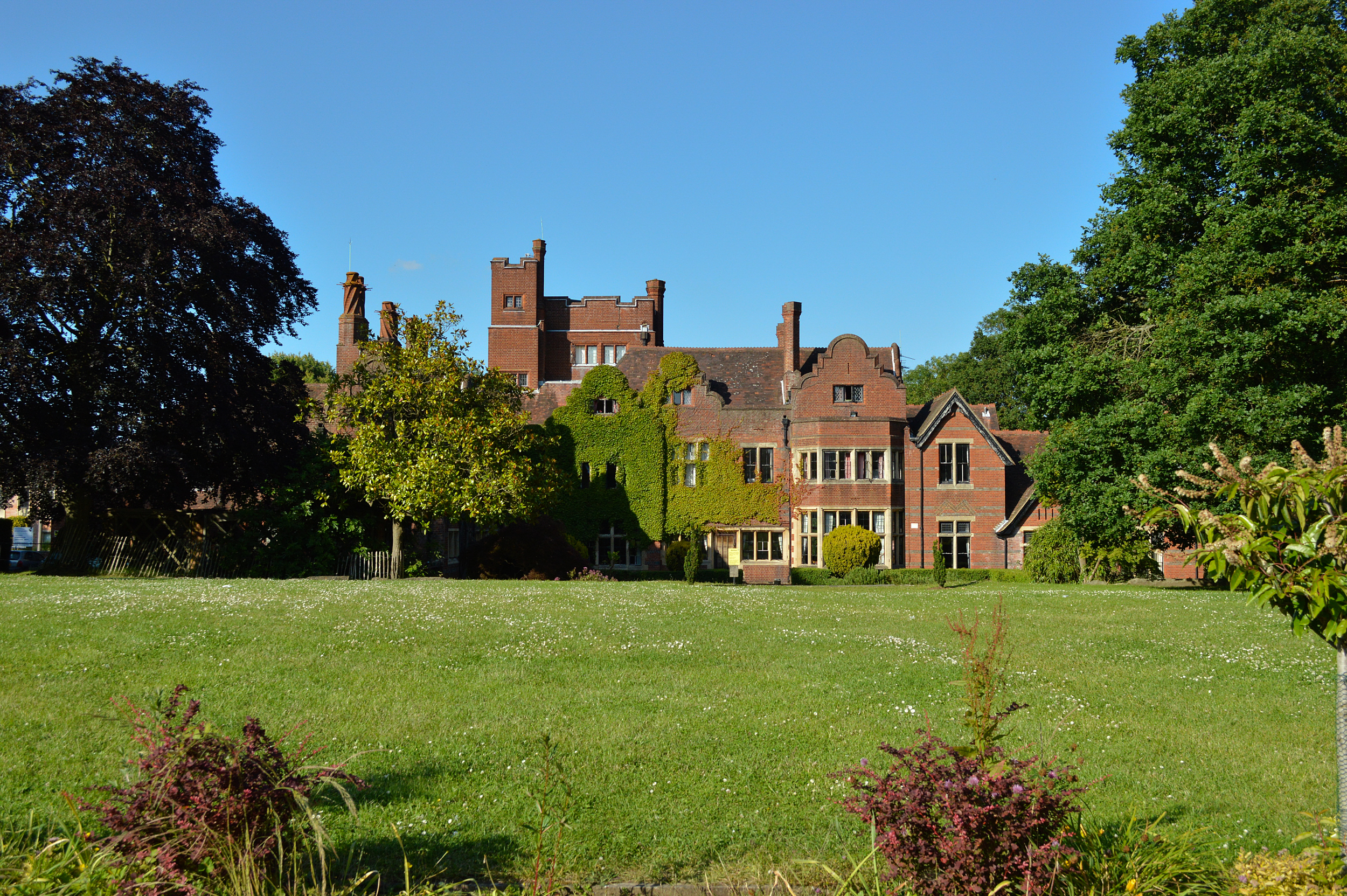
Moor Close

Newbold College of Higher Education opened in 1901 as Duncombe Hall College in Holloway, North London to train church workers and ministers. It has undergone a number of name changes. The Newbold name was taken from its Newbold Revel location to the east of Rugby, Warwickshire, during World War II. Another wartime Warwickshire location was Packwood Haugh, between Solihull and Stratford-Upon-Avon, Warwickshire. In 1945 the college purchased Moor Close, which expanded to the present-day campus. One factor for this choice was its proximity to Oxford and London. The existing campus is located near Heathrow Airport.

=== Moor Close ===
Moor Close is a Grade II listed redbrick Jacobethan house built in 1881. It was extended and altered c. 1914, with a complete Jacobethan interior, by architect and garden designer Oliver Hill for financier Charles Birch Crisp, to complement the terraces and gardens which Hill created over 1910–13. These are listed Grade II* in the National Register of Historic Parks and Gardens. Extending to the south and east of the house, the grounds contain a number of terraces on different levels, many linked by circular steps. There are courts, pergolas, staircases, balustrades and lily pools. Hill also built a stone bridge over a ravine, leading to Sylvia's Garden, named after Crisp's daughter. Moor Close was Hill's first major project, and was influenced by the work of garden designer Gertrude Jekyll.

== Campus ==
Campus facilities include Salisbury Hall, Murdoch Hall, Roy Graham Library and Egremont which are the main academic and administration buildings. Moor Close, Keough House and Schuil House are student residence halls, and family housing is located north of the campus at Ashgrove, Beechwood and Ceder Close. Sports facilities include a gym equipped for basketball, volleyball, floorball, football, badminton and a football pitch. Newbold Church Centre and Newbold School are located on the south side of campus adjacent to Moor Close Gardens.

The college hosts a local research centre of the Ellen G. White Estate in the Library. It collects and makes available material relating to the life and work of Ellen White and the theology, history and development of the Seventh-day Adventist Church as a worldwide, international organisation. It opened in 1974.

== Academics ==
Newbold College of Higher Education is accredited through Friedensau Adventist University in Germany, the oldest Seventh-day Adventist university in Europe, and also through Andrews University, Southern Adventist University and Washington Adventist University. Newbold is part of the worldwide network of Seventh-day Adventist colleges and universities.

Undergraduate degrees are offered in Business Studies and Theology/Divinity. Students may also choose to do a Bachelor of Arts or Bachelor of Science degree offered by Andrews University and Washington Adventist University. Students without the necessary entrance requirements may take foundation courses at the nearby Bracknell and Wokingham College.

Certificates, Postgraduate certificates and master's degrees are offered in Theology, Ministry and Church History.

The college offers a summer English programme for speakers of other languages as well as short courses throughout the academic year for EFL students.

== See also ==
- List of Seventh-day Adventist colleges and universities
- Seventh-day Adventist education
- Seventh-day Adventist Church
- Seventh-day Adventist theology
- History of the Seventh-day Adventist Church
- Adventist Colleges and Universities
