= Roorkee Adventist College =

Coordinates: 29.8302°N 77.8825°E

- Motto: To Educate for Eternity
- Type: Private
- Established: 1927
- President: Dr. Sanjeevan Arsud
- Administrative staff: approx. 50
- Students: approx. 800
- Location: Roorkee, Uttarakhand, India
- Campus: Rural

Roorkee Adventist College is a Seventh-day Adventist institution of higher learning near Roorkee, Uttarakhand, India. It is considered the church's flagship provider of higher education in North India. The college has affiliations with the Hemwati Nandan Bahuguna Garhwal University, India. It is a part of the Seventh-day Adventist education system, the world's second largest Christian school system.

== History ==
Seventh-day Adventist Inter College, Roorkee was founded in 1927 by F. H. Loasby as a pioneer missionary school. It was later operated as a training school for mission workers in the North-Western Union. Gradual growth followed and the curriculum was expanded to meet the demands of the growing number of students from Punjab and Uttar Pradesh. In 1942, under Pastor E. R. Streeter, it was recognized by the General Conference of Seventh-day Adventists and Southern Asia Division as a Division Co-Educational School. In 1961, the school was recognized by the Uttar Pradesh State Education Department as a Junior High School. Under the leadership of Dr. E. A. Streeter, the School was further upgraded into High School (Std I-X). In 1971, the Institution was affiliated to the Council for the Indian School Certificate Examination, New Delhi, offering the Indian Certificate of Secondary Education (ICSE) in the 10th year and Indian School Certificate (ISC) in the 12th year. In 1989 under the leadership of Dr. Edwin R. Dass the school was upgraded to become an Inter College. In 2001, the Adventist Accrediting Association permitted the upgrading of the college into an institution of higher learning as Roorkee Adventist Community College. In 2003, the College, rechristened itself to be called "Roorkee Adventist College" started offering degree programs in Computer Science, Science, Management, Information Technology and Commerce from the Hemwati Nandan Bahuguna Garhwal University, Srinagar, Uttarakhand.

== See also ==
- List of Seventh-day Adventist colleges and universities
- Seventh-day Adventist education
