= Xandria Kawanga =

Malawian fashion designer

Chikondi Kawanga, also Known as "Xandria" is a Malawian fashion designer, based in Lilongwe, Malawi. She is well known for pioneering inclusive fashion for marginalized groups by producing adaptive fashion for the disabled.

== Professional life ==
She is the founder and creative director of House of Xandria, a fashion house based in Malawi that produces bespoke and ready-to-wear garments for men and women. She founded Xandria in November 2015 at the age of 18, shortly after graduating from the University of Eastern Africa, Baraton Malawi Adventist University Campus. Other than pioneering adaptive fashion in Malawi, an initiative that promotes inclusion within the fashion industry, she is also an advocate for the fashion industry in the country.
