= Farooqabad =

City in Punjab, Pakistan

Farooqabad فارُوق آباد
- City
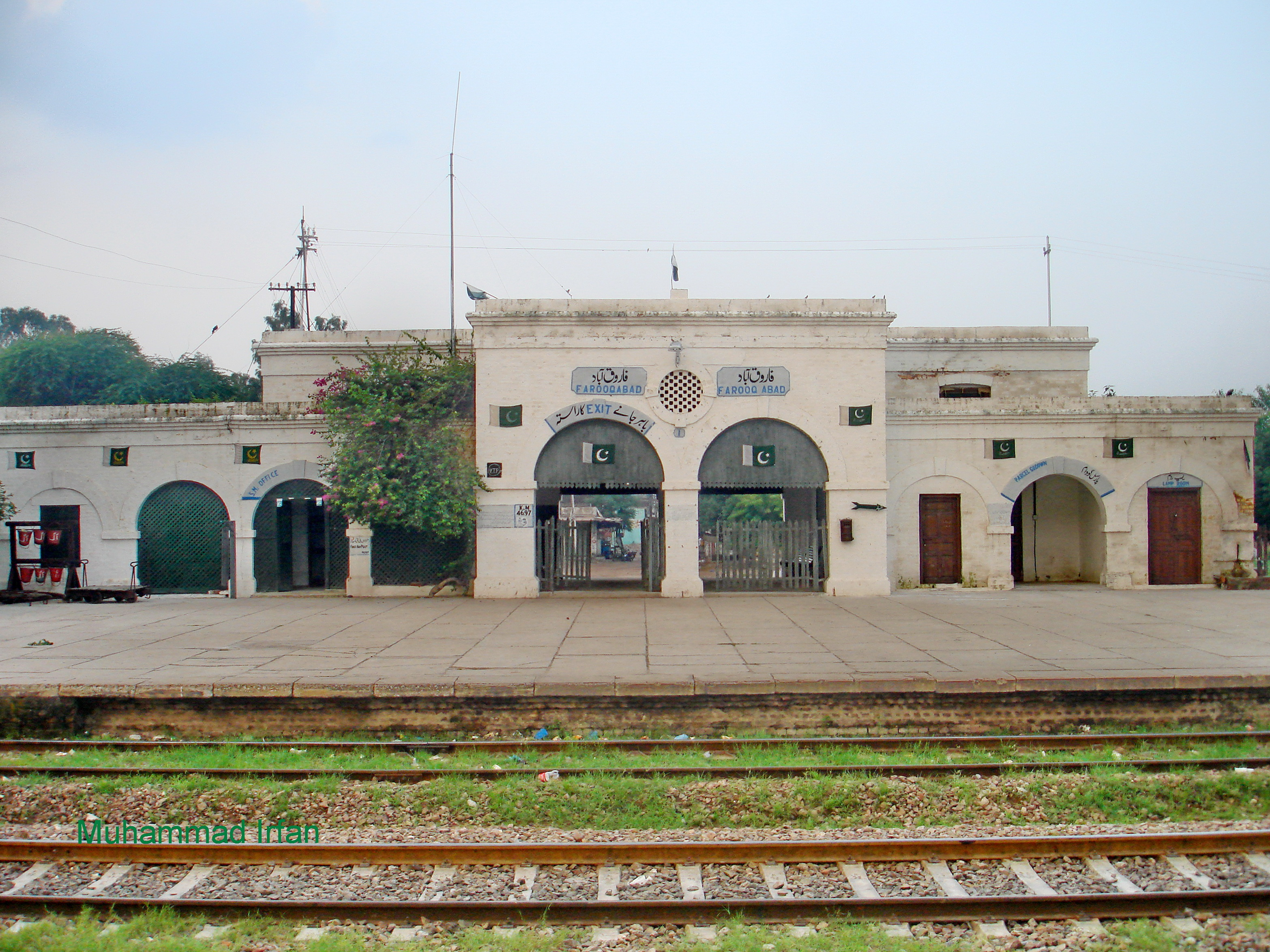
- Farooqabad Railway Station built during the British Rule around nineteenth century.

- Location within Punjab, Pakistan Location within Pakistan
- Coordinates: 31.74430°N 73.83342°E
- Country: Pakistan
- Province: Punjab
- District: Sheikhupura

Government
  - Type: Municipal Committee
  - Chairman: Vacant
  - Vice Chairman: Vacant
  - MNA: Khurram Munawar Manj
- Elevation: 210 m (690 ft)

Population (2023 census)
  - City: 109,717
  - Rank: 116th in Pakistan
- Time zone: UTC+5 (PST)
- Postal code: 39500
- Calling code: 056

Farooqabad (Urdu: فارُوق آباد), which was known as Chuhar Kana until 1983, is a city in Sheikhupura District, Punjab, Pakistan. It is situated along the twin canals (Qadirabad Balloki Link Canal and Upper Gogera Branch Canal) about 55 km west of Lahore on Sargodha Road along Lahore-Islamabad M-2 Motorway and on the Lahore-Faisalabad-Karachi main railway line.

The city was founded by Sardar Chuhar Singh.

== History ==
Originally known as Chuhar Kana, Farooqabad's founding is linked with Shamke, Banduke, and Jhamke, all the result of Sikh Sardar, Chuhar Singh's endeavours. He played a significant role in the city's establishment.

After the decline of the Mughal Empire, the Sikh Empire under Maharajah Ranjit Singh created a secular kingdom in the Punjab. The first police station in Farooqabad was set up during the British rule in 1924 and is called Sadar Thana Farooqabad. Steady growth followed as students came from all parts of the Punjab and North West India. The predominantly Muslim population supported the Muslim League and the Pakistan Movement. The independence of Pakistan in 1947 saw puritan influences come to the fore, while Chuhar Kana receded into relative insignificance. The minority Hindus and Sikhs in the Farooqabad area migrated to India while the Muslim refugees from India settled in the city.

With the advent of an Islamization push by the military government of Muhammad Zia-ul-Haq, the city experienced a period of transformation. The rechristening of Chuhar Kana as Farooqabad in 1983 encapsulates this transition, effectively realigning the city's historical narrative.

In recent times, 'Sikh Yatrees' (Sikh pilgrims) from all over the world have regularly been visiting their places of religious significance, like Sucha Sauda in the Farooqabad area.

== Specialty ==
This city has long remained the house of a large number of people belonging to the Sikh religion prior to the Partition of India. At the time of partition, most of the Sikh families moved to Indian Punjab fearing for their lives and property. But their cultural sites in Farooqabad still remain a specialty of this city. Moreover, this city is famous for its Punjab Police (Pakistan) training center.

Moreover, the Pakistan Adventist Seminary and College developed from a small Seventh-day Adventist Boys' School was founded in 1920 by the British. In 1937, it became a co-educational institution with the integration of the Seventh-day Adventist Girls' School.

The city also hosts one of the biggest Fountain House psychiatric rehabilitation centers in Pakistan.

== Demographics ==
=== Population ===
Historical population
Year	Pop.	±% p.a.
1951	6,585	—
1961	8,682	+2.80%
1972	15,146	+5.19%
1981	34,995	+9.75%
1998	57,601	+2.97%
2017	77,706	+1.59%
2023	109,717	+5.92%

As of the 2023 census, Farooqabad has population of 109,717.

Languages

Languages of Farooqabad MC (2023 Census)
1. Punjabi (89.3%)
2. Urdu (10.0%)
3. Others (0.70%)

== Notable people ==
- Usman Khan, Pakistani cricketer
