= Central Philippine Adventist College =

Private college in Negros Occidental, Philippines

- Motto: "In the World but Not of the World"
- Type: Private, Sectarian
- Established: 1981
- Religious affiliation: Seventh-day Adventist Church
- Academic affiliations: Association of Christian Schools, Colleges, and Universities
- President: Neda June D. Salazar, PhD, RGC
- Location: Alegria, Murcia, Negros Occidental, Negros Occidental, Philippines; 10°38′38″N 123°04′21″E
- Website: www.cpac.edu.ph

Central Philippine Adventist College (CPAC) is a private coeducational Christian college in Alegria, Murcia, Negros Occidental, Philippines. It is a part of the Seventh-day Adventist education system, the world's second largest Christian school system. The college is accredited by the Association of Christian Schools, Colleges and Universities-Accrediting Agency, Inc. (ACSCU-AAI), the Adventist Accrediting Agency (AAA) of General Conference of the Seventh-day Adventist Church, and by the Department of Education of Southern Asia Pacific Division.

== History ==
=== Beginnings ===
The Central Philippine Union Mission, founded in 1964, purchased a 71-hectare lot for P600,000 in Alegria, Murcia, 23 kilometers from Bacolod City, to set up a school. Mrs. May Chung donated $64,000 to add 35 hectares to the property. In 1981, the general conference allotted funds for the Central Philippine Union Mission College project.

=== 1980s ===
On August 12, 1981, groundbreaking ceremonies were held for the college. Keynote speaker was Dr. C. D. Hirsch, General Conference Director of Education, and the guest speaker was Negros Occidental governor Alfredo Montelibano Jr. Construction began on October 2, 1981, with architect-contractor Raymundo Victoriano donating his services as supervising engineer.

On June 14, 1982, registered with the Department of Education, Culture and Sports (DECS) as Central Philippine Adventist School, the college opened its door to students. There were 100 students and 17 faculty members; Pastor David Recalde was the president. As a junior or vocational college, Rural Health Nursing, Building Construction, Agriculture, and Biblical Studies were the first courses offered.

Initially there was only one multipurpose building called the Pioneer Hall, to house everybody and everything—the dormitories, faculty homes, administrative offices, cafeteria, library and the gym which is used for chapel, church, and other gatherings. The building was nicknamed "Noah’s Ark". In the Ark, the dormitories had no shutters; the faculty apartments had neither shutters nor room divisions, and the classrooms did not have desirable chairs and acoustics. The building was damaged by super-typhoon Nitang in September 1984, after which the walls were replaced with concrete.

On October 11, 1985, the name Central Philippine Adventist School was changed to Central Philippine Adventist College upon approval by the DECS of the four-year Agriculture course. New degrees and their corresponding buildings were added to the college: Accounting, Computer Science, Education, and Nursing. The Quiet Hour Clinic, Motor Pool, Cafeteria, and the dormitories were constructed.

=== 2000 to now ===
By the year 2000, a recreation center with two swimming pools, guesthouses, two tennis courts, and rows of cottages was built. A gazebo, the Student Government Center, Fast Food Center, the College Store, the three-story building for the School of Nursing, the basement and second floor for the School of Business, and the Mushroom House were subsequently constructed.

The Education That Saves Village, which served as low-cost housing for working students, was founded in 2001. In 2005, the Conference Hall was inaugurated. The Engineering building, Function Hall, and the College Church were inaugurated during CPAC's Silver Anniversary in August 2007. At Vespers of August 10, the church was dedicated to the Lord.

The Wisdom Park, International Friendship Park, the NSTP guesthouses, and the Tilapia pond were built from 2007 to 2009. In April 2008, a Worship Hall was built for the working students' cottage.

On March 20, 2009, the Eco-Park beside the cottage area and the library were inaugurated. The library, which includes the review center and audio-visual room, is on the second floor and stands on two QUADs: the fully renovated Agriculture, and Old Nursing buildings.

The college now offers fourteen curricula in these five schools or departments: Business, Nursing, Education, Agriculture and Theology.

The campus also serves as Distance Learning Center (DLC) for the Adventist International Institute for Advanced Studies (AIIAS).

CPAC also shares the Church's educational philosophy and seeks to function as a resource center which can facilitate the development and spread of the Gospel in the Central Philippines and far beyond.

== See also ==
- List of Seventh-day Adventist colleges and universities
- Seventh-day Adventist education
