= Cosendai Adventist University =

Private Christian university in Cameroon

Coordinates: 4.68°N 12.35°E

- Université Adventiste Cosendai
- Other name: Adventist University Cosendai
- Motto: Knowledge, duty, virtue
- Established: 1996; 30 years ago
- Accreditation: The Accrediting Association of Seventh-day Adventist Schools, Colleges, and Universities (AAA)
- Location: Nanga-Eboko, Cameroon
- Campus: Douala, Yaounde, Namga-Eboko
- Website: www.uacosendai-edu.net

Cosendai Adventist University (French: Université Adventiste Cosendai) is a private Christian university belonging to the Seventh-day Adventist education system.

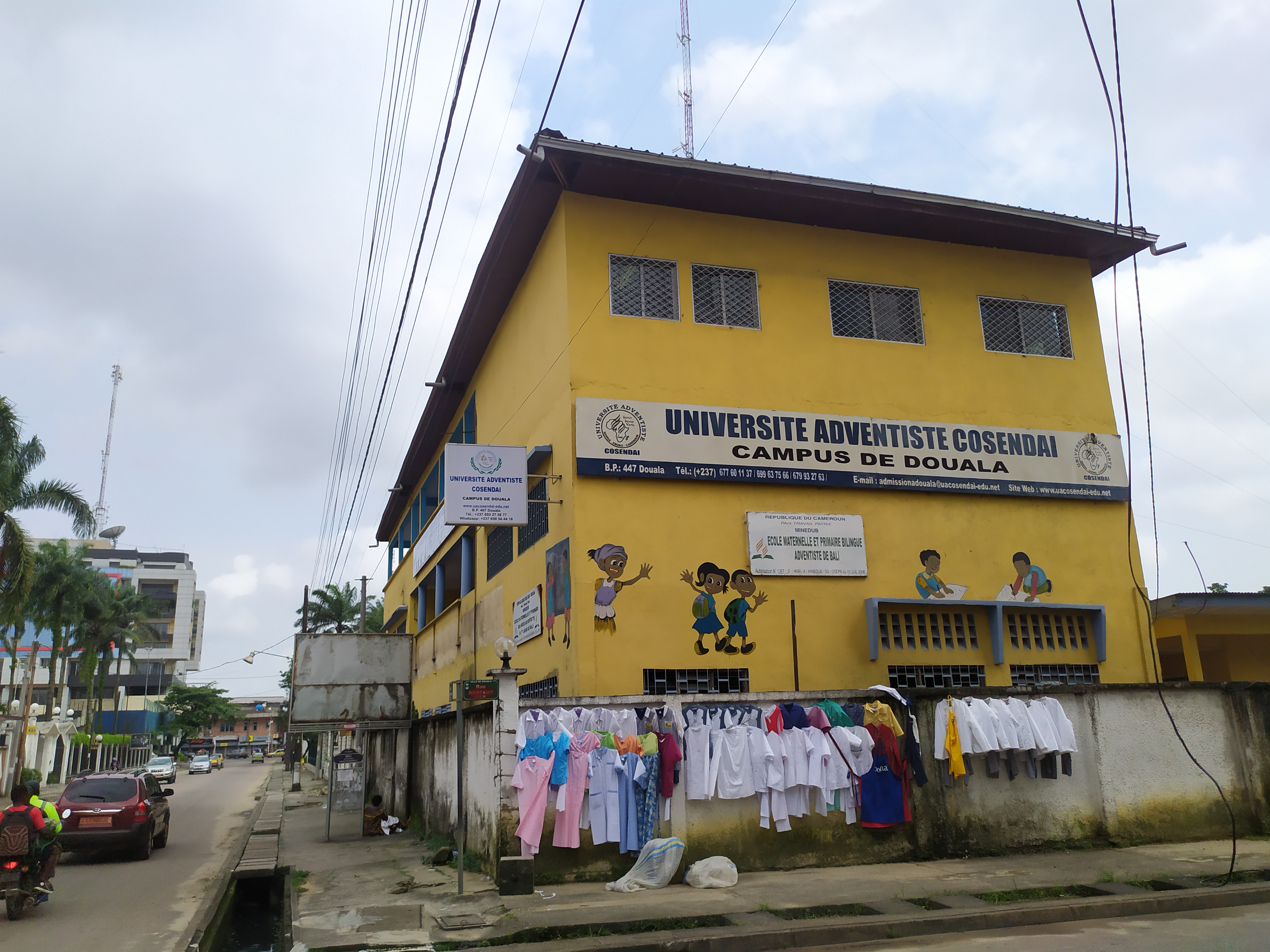
Cosendai Adventist University Campus in Douala

== History ==
Cosendai Adventist University was founded in 1996 after the dislocation of Adventist University of Central Africa

== See also ==
- Seventh-day Adventist education
- List of Seventh-day Adventist colleges and universities
