= Venezuelan Adventist University =

- Instituto Universitario Adventista de Venezuela
- Type: Private
- Established: 1962
- Affiliations: Seventh day Adventist Church
- President: Edgar Brito
- Location: Nirgua, Yaracuy, Venezuela; 10.1494°N 68.5171°W
- Website: iunav.com

The Venezuelan Adventist University (Instituto Universitario Adventista de Venezuela - IUNAV) is a Seventh-day Adventist co-educational university located in Nirgua, Venezuela, and accredited by the Adventist Accrediting Association.

It is a part of the Seventh-day Adventist education system, the world's second largest Christian school system.

== History ==
Founded in 1962 as Venezuela Adventist Secondary School, it later became the Vocational Institute of Venezuela, and finally in 1999 Venezuelan Adventist University was authorized by the government of Venezuela. IUNAV offers undergraduate and graduate level degrees.

== See also ==
- List of Seventh-day Adventist colleges and universities
- Seventh-day Adventist education
