= Mamarapha College =

Theological institution in Karragullen, Western Australia

Coordinates: 32°05′11″S 116°07′12″E

- Type: Private
- Established: 1997
- Affiliations: Seventh-day Adventist Church
- Director: David Garrard
- Faculty: 3
- Location: Karragullen
- Website: http://mamarapha.adventist.place/

Mamarapha College is a post-secondary theological institution for Indigenous Australians located in Karragullen, Western Australia.

The college is a part of the Seventh-day Adventist education system, the world's second largest Christian school system.

Students come from all states of Australia and range in age from 19 to 70 years. Their educational background ranges from marginal literacy to those with a degree.

Mamarapha College is a registered training organisation and awards range from Certificate 1 through to 4 year advanced diploma. Study is offered via study blocks ("intensives") for some courses while ministers in training study full-time for their second and third year then learn on the job with a minister in the field for their fourth year.

== History ==
Mamarapha College was set up by the Seventh-day Adventist Church in 1997 to train Indigenous pastors and members in the Bible and ministry skills. The word mamarapha is a composite from western desert Aboriginal languages and Hebrew and means "God makes whole". Personal spiritual development is the primary focus of the college and learning to minister to others is another focus of the program.

== See also ==
- List of Seventh-day Adventist colleges and universities
