= University of Eastern Africa, Baraton =

University in Kenya

- Motto: Mental, Physical, Spiritual
- Type: Private
- Established: 1980
- Faculty: 250
- Location: Kapsabet, Nandi County, Kenya
- Campus: 339 acres (1.37 km^{2})
- Colors: Blue and gold
- Website: www.ueab.ac.ke

The University of Eastern Africa, Baraton (UEAB) is a private coeducational Seventh-day Adventist university located in Baraton, about 50 km from Eldoret Kenya. It offers degrees in graduate and undergraduate programs in the fields of Business, the Humanities, Agriculture, Technology, Health Sciences and Education. Baraton University, as it is popularly known, is run by the Seventh-day Adventist Church, and is part of its system of higher education. It is accredited by the Commission for Higher Education, Kenya Government, and was the first private university to receive a charter granted by the Republic of Kenya on March 28, 1991. The university is a member of the Inter-University Council for East Africa, The Association of Commonwealth Universities, and the Association of African Universities.

It is a part of the Seventh-day Adventist education system, the world's second largest Christian school system.

The mission of UEAB is the provision of a Christian quality education for the youth with the aim of equipping them with necessary skills for service for God and humanity.

== History ==
The beginning of Seventh-day Adventist education in this part of Africa dates back to the establishment of the Seventh-day Adventist Church in the region. The earliest church was established in Tanzania in 1903, followed by church work around Lake Victoria, especially with the 1906 establishment of a mission at the Homa-Bay County's Gendia, the current location of the Kendu Adventist Hospital, Gendia High School and the Africa Herald and Publishing House. In 1928 what is now known as Kamagambo Adventist College was established in Rongo Town, Migori County.

Many primary and secondary school have since been established. Some of these have been offering post secondary education, but none of them has offered a full bachelor's degree program. For this reason, students desiring that level of education in an Adventist institution before 1980 had to go outside Eastern Africa. During the 1970s, the Middle East University in Beirut Lebanon served many such students. Thus, there was a great need for a full-fledged university in Eastern Africa.

In October 1978, the Board of the Afro-Mideast Division of Seventh-day Adventists took an action to establish such a university in Kenya on December 21, 1978. The Kenya Government allotted the Baraton Animal Husbandry Research Station of 339 acres (1.37 km²) in Nandi District to the Seventh-day Adventist Church for the purpose of founding what is now known as the University of Eastern Africa, Baraton. Classes began in January 1980 in the temporary farm structures. Some of these structures have since been replaced with new and modern buildings.

== Schools ==
- School of Business
- School of Humanities and Social Sciences
- School of Health Sciences
- School of Science and Technology
- School of Education.

== Notable people ==
=== Alumni ===
- Christopher Mwashinga, writer

== See also ==
- List of Seventh-day Adventist colleges and universities
- Seventh-day Adventist education
- East Kenya Union Conference
