= McNeilus Maranatha Christian College =

Operated by Myanmar Union Conference of Seventh-day Adventists

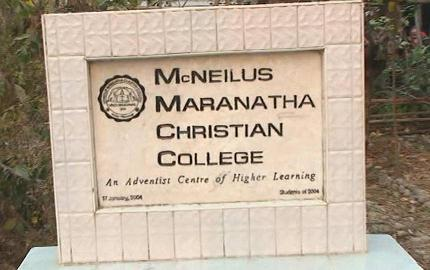
- Former names: Kalay Adventist College; Maranatha Christian College
- Motto: Vincit Amor Omnia
- Motto in English: Love Conquers All
- Type: Private
- Established: 2000; 26 years ago
- President: Dr Gin Lian Mung
- Location: Kalaymyo, Sagaing, Myanmar
- Campus: Rural
- Colors: White and Blue

McNeilus Maranatha Christian College (an Adventist Center of Higher Learning), formerly known as Maranatha Christian College, is a Seventh-day Adventist Christian school in Kalaymyo, Myanmar (Burma). It is owned and operated by Myanmar Union Conference of Seventh-day Adventists. It was established in 2000 and is a part of the Seventh-day Adventist education system, the world's second largest Christian school system.

== Location ==
MMCC is located on Khaing Shwe Waa Rd, Chamie Aungshii, PO 02091, Kalaymyo, Sagaing Division, Myanmar.

== Degree courses ==
The college offers the following courses:

1. Bachelor of Arts in Education
2. Bachelor of Arts in Religion
3. Bachelor of Ministry

== See also ==
- List of Seventh-day Adventist colleges and universities
- Seventh-day Adventist education
