= University of Navojoa =

Coordinates: 27.0023°N 109.5293°W

- Motto: "Somos una Institución que promueve una Educación Integral y Valores Cristianos" ("We are an institution that promotes Christian Education and Values")
- Type: Private
- Established: 1948
- Affiliations: Seventh-day Adventist Church
- President: Gabriel D., Camacho Bojórquez
- Vice-Chancellor: Oscar Rivera Mendoza
- Faculty: 36
- Location: Navojoa, Sonora, Mexico
- Campus: Rural
- Website: http://www.unavojoa.net/
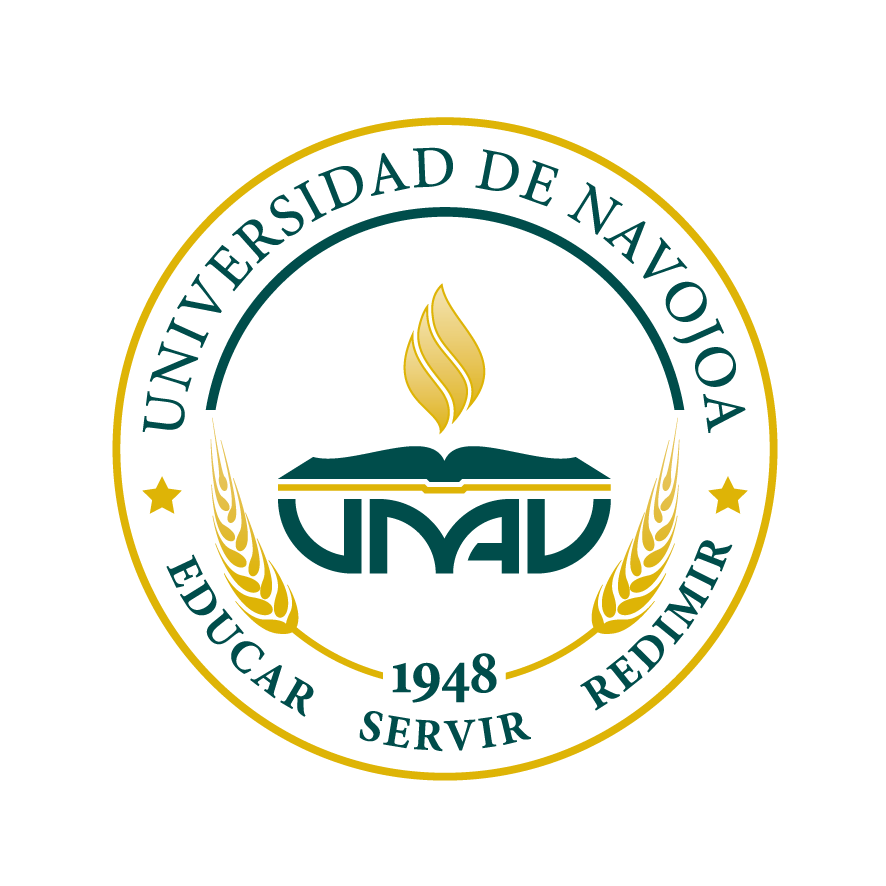

The University of Navojoa (Spanish, Universidad de Navojoa) is a Seventh-day Adventist institution of higher learning located in Navojoa, Sonora, Mexico. The University confers degrees in religion, education, nutrition and business. The university offers a Masters of Business Administration (MBA).

It is a part of the Seventh-day Adventist education system, the world's second largest Christian school system.

== See also ==
- List of Seventh-day Adventist colleges and universities
- Seventh-day Adventist education
