= Adventist University of Haiti =

Christian university in Ouest, Haiti

Coordinates: 18.526613°N 72.385107°W

- Type: Private
- Established: 1921; 105 years ago
- Affiliations: Seventh-day Adventist Church
- Students: 617
- Location: Carrefour area of Port-au-Prince, Haiti
- Campus: 78 acres (320,000 m^{2})
- Language: French
- Website: www.unah.edu.ht

Adventist University of Haiti (in French: Université Adventiste d'Haïti) is situated some five miles (8 km) southwest of Port-au-Prince, in the Carrefour neighborhood.

It is a part of the Seventh-day Adventist education system, the world's second largest Christian school system.

== History ==
First established in 1921 as Séminaire Adventiste d'Haïti, near Cap-Haïtien, the school was moved to Port-au-Prince in 1933. It was authorized to offer complete secondary work by the Ministry of Education in 1935. In 1946 the seminary was moved to its present site. Authorized to offer the Baccalaureate degree by the Ministry of Education in 1959, in 1964 it was granted General Conference authorization to offer two-year postsecondary work. The degree of Bachelor of Theology (license) was authorized by the General Conference in 1973. Currently, the institution offers degree programs in other areas also.

The school offers degrees in business administration, education, and theology. It also offers diploma programs in secretarial science, music, modern languages, and other areas.

== See also ==
- List of Seventh-day Adventist colleges and universities
- Seventh-day Adventist education
