= Kamagambo Adventist College =

- Type: Private
- Established: 1912
- Affiliations: Seventh-day Adventist Church
- Location: Kisii, Kenya
- Website: www.kac.ac.ke

Kamagambo Adventist College is a private Christian co-educational institution of higher learning owned and operated by the Seventh-day Adventist Church in Kenya. The college is located in Kisii, Kenya.

It is a part of the Seventh-day Adventist education system.

== See also ==
- List of Seventh-day Adventist colleges and universities
- Seventh-day Adventist education
- Seventh-day Adventist Church
- Seventh-day Adventist theology
- History of the Seventh-day Adventist Church
