= Pakistan Adventist Seminary & College =

Coordinates: 31.74770°N 73.83068°E

- Motto: Prudence. Advancement. Service
- Type: Private
- Established: 1920
- President: Gee Sungbae
- Location: Sheikhupura District, Punjab, Pakistan
- Website: www.pasc.edu.pk

Pakistan Adventist Seminary & College is a Christian co-educational institution of higher learning located in the Punjab province of Pakistan. The purpose of the Pakistan Adventist Seminary is to train workers to serve the church in Pakistan and beyond, as well as to prepare Christian youth for useful service to society.

It is a part of the Seventh-day Adventist education system, the world's second largest Christian school system.

== History ==
Pakistan Adventist Seminary & College is located 60 km west of Lahore on Sargodha Road at Farooqabad Mandi. The institution is located on 35 acres (140,000 m^{2}) of land. Pakistan Adventist Seminary & College (PASC) developed from a small Seventh-day Adventist boys' school founded in 1920. In 1937, it became a co-educational institution with the integration of the seventh-day Adventist girls' school. Steady growth followed as students came in from all parts of the Punjab and North West India.

In 1957, PASC started offering a 2-year junior seminary program. Later a senior seminary program was developed and the first graduates received their degrees in 1970. The institution now incorporates the elementary school (class 1–8), high school (class 9 and 10) and college, offering a two-year diploma, and 4- and 5-year degree in different disciplines.

PASC is an institution that is administered by the Pakistan Union of Seventh-day Adventists and has been a part of the Trans-European Division (TED) of the Senventh-day Adventists territory since 1985 but now is a part of the Southern Asia Pacific Division (SSD) of Seventh-day Adventists since 2011.

In 2003 it offered FSc, Pre-medical, BBA, ICS, BA, Education, and Theology courses of discipline.

== PASC Alumni Association (PASCAA) ==
PASC Alumni Association was organized in 2007 by graduates of Pakistan Adventist Seminary & College upon request of the college administration. PASCAA exists to promote awareness, communication and interaction between overseas alumni and the college, and to unite graduates, former students, and friends of the college for mutual benefit and to promote the welfare and advance the interests of the college.

== See also ==
- List of Seventh-day Adventist colleges and universities
- Seventh-day Adventist education
