= Baraton =

- Location in Kenya
- Coordinates: 0.254°N 35.081°E
- Country: Kenya
- Province: Rift Valley Province

Population
  - Total: 2,043
- Time zone: UTC+3 (EAT)
- Postal code: 30300

Baraton is a small town in Western Kenya, situated 50 km from the town of Eldoret. It is home to the University of Eastern Africa, Baraton and is in Nandi County. Baraton has been rapidly growing in terms of housing for students within the last few years as of 2020, it also has a small market area that consists several shops, chemists and hotels.
