= Herbert Fletcher University =

Online distance learning educational institution

Herbert Fletcher University (HFU)
- Type: Private
- Established: 2013
- Affiliations: Seventh-day Adventist Church (SDA)
- President: Carlos Robles, MSc
- Campus: Virtual (Online)
- Website: www.hfu.edu

Herbert Fletcher University (HFU) is a non profit online distance learning educational institution of the Inter‐American Division of the Seventh-day Adventist Church. It is a part of the Seventh-day Adventist education system, the world's second largest Christian school system. It is named after the late Herbert L. Fletcher who was a church leader and educator within the Division for half a century. He was a past president of West Indies College (now Northern Caribbean University).

The University was founded in 2013. In 2016 HFU received authorization of the Puerto Rico Education Council. It also manages the Adventist Virtual Library (AVL). Thousands of resources like magazine articles, books, newspaper, dissertations are available through the AVL. The students of the Adventist education system within the Inter-America Division have access to the AVL.

The University is sponsored by and affiliated with the Seventh-day Adventist Church. It is situated within the building of the Puerto Rican Union Conference. The HFU offices would soon have a new building located on the campus of the Antillean Adventist University, an institution operated by the Seventh-day Adventist Church in Puerto Rico. HFU offers graduate studies fully online including Master in Church Administration and Leadership, and Master in Online Instructional Design.

== See also ==
- List of Seventh-day Adventist colleges and universities
- Seventh-day Adventist education
