= List of universities in Malawi =

This is a list of universities in Malawi.

== Public universities ==
- Kamuzu University of Health Sciences - KUHeS (formerly the University of Malawi College of Medicine COM)
- Lilongwe University of Agriculture and Natural Resources
- Malawi University of Science and Technology
- Mzuzu University
- University of Malawi
- Malawi University of Business and Applied Sciences - MUBAS (formerly The Polytechnic College)

== Private universities ==
- Catholic University of Malawi
- Malawi Adventist University
- University of Livingstonia
- Blantyre International University - BIU
- Central Christian University-CCU
- Daeyang University
- DMI-St. John the Baptist University
- Emmanuel University, Malawi
- Exploits University
- Hebron University, Malawi
- Jubilee University
- Lake Malawi Anglican University
- Lonjezo University
- Malawi Assemblies of God University
- Millenium University
- Nkhoma University
- Pentecostal Life University
- ShareWorld Open University Malawi (SOUMA)
- University of Lilongwe - UniLi
- Mwimba College of Agriculture
