= Seventh-day Adventist College of Education (India) =

- Motto: Educate For Eternity
- Type: Private
- Established: 2008
- President: Dr.A.Vijayakumar
- Location: Vellore, Tamil Nadu, India
- Campus: Rural
- Website: http://www.sdacollegeofeducation.in

Seventh-day Adventist College of Education is a Seventh-day Adventist institution of higher learning in Vellore, Tamil Nadu, India. It is a part of the Seventh-day Adventist education system, the world's second largest Christian school system.

== History ==
The college was initiated in 1992 by Pr. Dudley Ponniah largely as a work of faith, with only 12 students meeting in the church's vestry without much support. It was formally inaugurated by the Division President Pr.R.John in the presence of the Division and Union leaders on 10 November 2008.

== Campus ==
The college is located 130 km south west of Chennai along the Chennai-Bangalore Highway.

== See also ==
- List of Seventh-day Adventist colleges and universities
- Seventh-day Adventist education
