= Ethiopian Adventist College =

Private Christian co-educational college in Ethiopia

Ethiopia Adventist College
- Type: Private
- Established: 1947
- President: Abraham Dalu
- Location: Shashamane (Kuyera sub-city), Ethiopia
- Website: eac.edu.et

Ethiopia Adventist College (EAC) is a private Christian co-educational college located on 182 hectares some 234 kilometers southeast of Addis Ababa in West Arsi Zone of the Oromia Region in Ethiopia. It is owned and run by the Seventh-day Adventist Church and is part of the Seventh-day Adventist education system, the world's second largest Christian school system.
