= Adventist College of Education =

Teacher education college in Ghana

- Mother SEDACoE
- Established: October 26, 1962
- Founder: Stocks
- Affiliations: UEW
- Principal: Prof. Vincent Adzahlie-Mensah
- Dean: Dr. Agbofa Justice
- Location: P.O.Box 18, Asokore, Eastern Region, New Juaben Municipal District, EN182, Ghana; 6.11809°N 0.27649°W
- Language: English
- Region Zone: Eastern; Eastern / Greater Accra
- Short name: SEDACoE
- Website: www.sedacoe.edu.gh
- Source: An Atlas of The Forty Colleges of Education in Ghana.

Adventist College of Education is a teacher education college in Asokore (New Juaben Municipal District, Eastern Region Ghana). The college is located in Eastern / Greater Accra zone. It is one of the about 40 public colleges of education in Ghana. The college participated in the DFID-funded T-TEL programme.

The college is affiliated to the University of Education, Winneba.

== History ==
The S.D.A College of Education was established by the government in collaboration with the SDA Church on 26 October 1962 with 120 students. The College is about 84 kilometres from Accra, Ghana’s capital. It has an area of 35.9 hectares (about 88.75 acres).

The highest governing body of the College is the Board of Governors which is chaired by Pastor Kwabena Twum, President of East Ghana Conference of S.D.A Church.

== Education ==
The SDA college of education offers Bachelor in Basic Education.

=== Programmes ===
1. B.Ed Early Grade Education
2. B.Ed Primary Education
3. B.Ed J.H.S Education

== Notable alumni ==
Pastor Dr. Seth A. Laryea, the President of Valley View University at Oyibi, Accra.

Pastor Dr. A. L. Ewoo

Dr. D. R. Asafo, Mr. Joshua

Dr. Yaw Afari Ankoma

Dr. Frederick Ocansey

Prof. Kwame Ameyaw Domfe.

Prof. Vincent Adzahlie-Mensah
