= Yangon Adventist Seminary =

Coordinates: 16°48′16.43″N 96°10′3.25″E

Yangon Adventist Seminary International School

Location
- 34 Natmauk Lane (1), Bahan, Yangon 11201; Yangon; Myanmar

Information
- Former names: YAS
- Type: International, (Protestant) Adventist university
- Motto: "Fear of God is the beginning of Knowledge!"
- Established: 1975
- Nickname: YASIS
- Affiliation: Seventh-day Adventist Church

The Yangon Adventist Seminary International School (YASIS) is a Christian institution owned and operated by the Seventh-day Adventist Church since 1975. It is open to young people who want to study in a Christian atmosphere. Non-Christian students who can make the agreement to follow the rules and regulations of the school may be accepted. YASIS is accredited by the Accrediting Association of Seventh-day Adventist School, Colleges, and Universities(AAA), Maryland, USA.

YASIS focuses on recognizing outstanding, student achievement in all areas and has programs that include awards focusing on academic performance and athletics.

- Academic Performance Award
- Athletic Award

== Principals ==
- 1975–1985: Daw Yee Yee Shwe
- 1985–1990: Daw Noreen Shwe
- 1990–1991: U Jonathan Zaw Weik
- 1991–2002: U Claudius Brown
- 2002–2005: U Saw Lay Wah
- 2005–2013: U Claudius Brown
- 2013–2016: U Kyaw Myint Naing
- 2016–2021: U Saw Lay Wah
- 2022–2025: Daw Sonia Shine
- 2026-present; U Matthew Paul
