= Middle Tennessee School of Anesthesia =

Private graduate school in Madison, Tennessee, US

- Middle Tennessee School of Anesthesia Logo
- Former name: Madison Hospital School of Anesthesia
- Motto: Reflecting Christ in Anesthesia Education
- Type: Private
- Established: 1950
- Affiliations: Seventh-day Adventist
- President: Chris Hulin
- Location: Madison, Tennessee, United States; 36.2532°N 86.6837°W
- Campus: Suburban
- Website: mtsa.edu

Middle Tennessee School of Anesthesia (MTSA) is a private graduate school specializing in nurse anesthesia education and located in Madison, Tennessee. The school is accredited by the Council on Accreditation of Nurse Anesthesia Educational Programs of the American Association of Nurse Anesthetists and the Southern Association of Colleges and Schools Commission on Colleges. Founded in 1950 as Madison Hospital School of Anesthesia, it later became Middle Tennessee School of Anesthesia. MTSA offers a Master of Science (MS) with a focus in Nurse Anesthesia as well as Doctor of Nursing Anesthesia Practice (DNAP) degree. It is the second-largest nurse anesthesia program in the United States. The primary clinical affiliate of MTSA is Vanderbilt University.
