= Seeking a Sanctuary =

Book about the Seventh Day Adventist Church

Seeking a Sanctuary: Seventh-day Adventism and the American Dream
- First edition
- Author: Malcolm Bull and Keith Lockhart
- Publisher: Indiana University Press
- Publication date: 2006
- ISBN: 978-0-253-21868-1

Seeking a Sanctuary: Seventh-day Adventism and the American Dream is a book about the Seventh-day Adventist Church coauthored by Malcolm Bull and Keith Lockhart.
