= Lakpahana Adventist College and Seminary =

Lakpahana Adventist College and Seminary is a school in Sri Lanka founded in 1924.

The school includes primary school, O and A Levels, and vocational training in batak and brick laying. It also has on campus industries .

The college portion of the school includes a teacher training school and seminary for training ministers. The school name means Light of Sri Lanka. It is part of the worldwide Seventh-day Adventist system of education.
