= Koforidua-Asokore =

Town in Ghana

Asokore
- Urban area
- Country: Ghana
- Region: Eastern Region
- District: New-Juaben Municipal District
- Time zone: GMT
  - Summer (DST): GMT

Asokore is a town in the New Juaben Municipal District of the Eastern Region of Ghana. The town is located along the Koforidua-Oyoko road. It is a traditional town.

== History ==
After the defeat of the Ashanti Empire by the British forces in 1874, many people fled from Juaben (a town under Ashanti rule) southwards, and they settled in what became known as New Juaben. This area included Koforidua and Asokore.

These migrants brought with them their traditions, governance structures, and community spirit. Gradually, Asokore developed as a distinct town within the New Juaben area, contributing to the cultural (Akwantukese Festival) and educational landscape of the Eastern Region.

The migration and settlement are observed annually by the people of New Juaben, celebrating their resilience and the founding of their new home.
