= Pacific Adventist University =

Tertiary institution in Papua New Guinea

- Former name: Pacific Adventist College
- Motto: Educate to Serve
- Type: Private
- Established: 1984
- Affiliations: Seventh-day Adventist Church
- Chancellor: Prof Glenn Townend
- Vice-Chancellor: Prof Lohi Matainaho
- Students: more than 1000
- Location: Port Moresby, National Capital District, Papua New Guinea; 9.40575°S 147.27561°E
- Campus: Koiari Park Campus
- Website: www.pau.ac.pg

Pacific Adventist University (PAU) is a tertiary institution located 21 kilometres (30 minutes) outside Port Moresby, Papua New Guinea, and operated by the South Pacific Division of the Seventh-day Adventist Church. Both the faculty and the student body are international in composition. While most students come from Papua New Guinea and other Pacific island nations such as Tonga, Fiji, Samoa, Vanuatu and the Solomon Islands, others have come from Africa, Australia, Pakistan, China, the Philippines, and the United States.

It is a part of the Seventh-day Adventist education system, the world's second largest Christian school system.

== Campus ==
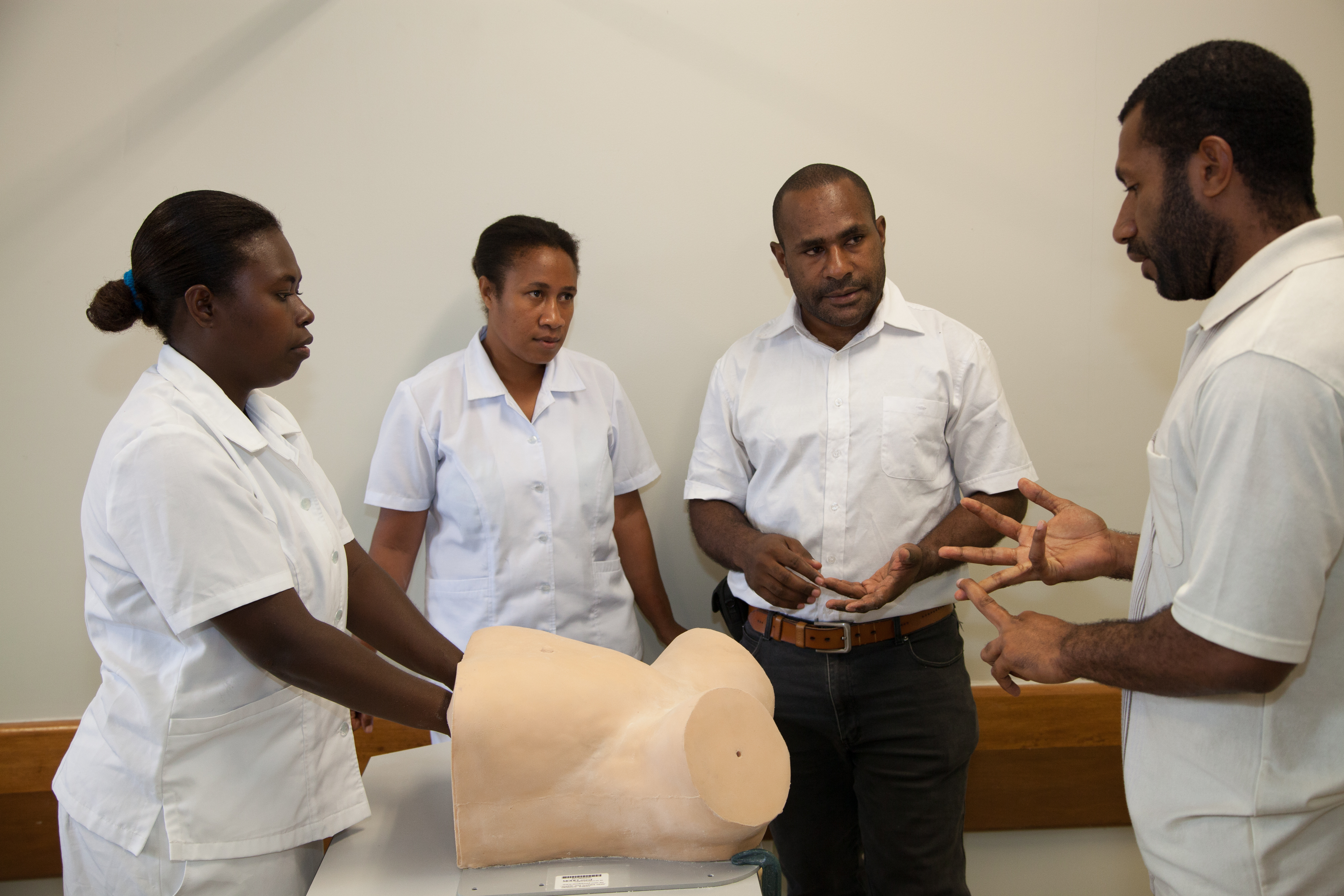
Midwives training at Pacific Adventist University.

The campus is also known as a bird sanctuary. One species of bird at the campus is unique to this area of the world. Mike Tarburton, who is also known as the "bird man" had stayed there and carefully monitored the bird life. He has now transferred to Australia for retirement, and his work has been taken up by his students. The campus is often visited by bird watchers from all over the world.

The university is also home to the Koiari Park Adventist Church, the services of which are conducted in English. There is also a second church in which services are conducted in Tok Pisin. The senior church Pastor is currently Pr Lucas Marley, who is himself a graduate of P.A.U.

== Farming ==
PAU is home to Port Moresby city's fresh produce. Every Sunday morning as early as 5 am, city residents queue up to bag their portion for the week. Many expatriates, business houses and the well-to-do in the city enjoy the fresh vegetables and fruits, and paid breakfast is also served by residents while the market runs its course. Thus, PAU enjoys a good portion of financial economical benefit apart from the appropriations from its church and the fees.

== History ==
The institution was established as Pacific Adventist College, a college of higher education, in 1983 and given a charter as a university by the Papua New Guinea government in 1997. Currently, the school offers bachelor's and (some) master's degrees in business, education, science, health science (nursing), theology and humanities.

== Academic divisions ==
The university is divided into the following schools:

- School of Humanities, Education and Theology
- School of Business
- School of Health Science
- School of Science and Technology

== Publications ==
A Pacific Adventist University Monograph Series has begun publication with faculty member Jennifer Jones' study of Seventh-day Adventist Church music in Papua New Guinea. This volume was co-published by the Institute of Papua New Guinea Studies.

At the twenty-fifth anniversary of founding of the university (August 2009) a new electronic journal was launched called Davaria: Journal of Pacific Adventist University." At the same time the university launched a further communication venture when it set up a Community Radio Station—Radio 2G; 97.9 FM

== Former principals of Pacific Adventist College ==
- Ray Wilkinson
- Alan Sonter
- Owen Hughes

== Former Vice-Chancellors ==
- Owen Hughes
- Harold Peters
- Nemani Tausere
- Branimir Schubert
- Ben Thomas

== See also ==
- List of Seventh-day Adventist colleges and universities
- Seventh-day Adventist education
