= Hebei Finance University =

Public College in Baoding, China

Coordinates: 38°55′12.018″N 115°30′0.4788″E

Hebei Finance University HBFU
- 河北金融学院
- Motto: 明德 守信 求真 尚行
- Type: Public College
- Established: 1952; 74 years ago
- President: Chen Zhiqiang (陈志强)
- Party Secretary: Yang Zhaoyan (杨兆廷)
- Total staff: 815
- Students: 13,775
- Location: Baoding, Hebei, China
- Campus: 186.98 acres; Urban
- Website: www.hbfu.edu.cn

Hebei Finance University (HBFU)(Chinese: 河北金融学院; pinyin: Héběi Jinróng Xùeyuàn), formerly known as Hebei Finance College, is located in Baoding, Hebei Province, China. In 2023, the university has an enrollment of 13,775, including 185 graduates and 12,137 undergraduates.

== History ==
The school was founded in 1952 and was originally under the jurisdiction of the People's Bank of China Headquarters. During its initial stages of development, it went through various names, including Hebei Provincial Bank School, Baoding Bank School, Hebei Finance and Economics School, and Hebei Banking School. In 1984, it was upgraded to a specialized college and renamed "Baoding Financial Specialized College." In 1992, it was renamed "Baoding Higher Vocational College of Finance." In the year 2000, it came under the administration of the People's Government of Hebei Province, adopting a management system of "joint construction by the central and local authorities, with local management as the primary focus." In 2007, it was further upgraded to a university and renamed Hebei Finance University.

== Campus ==
The University campus covers an area of over 186.98 acres.

The University library has a collection of 1,270,000 books and 8,674 periodicals published at home and abroad.

== Departments ==
Hebei Finance University consists of 13 departments with four teaching departments for public courses and one for international collaboration and education.

- Finance Department
- Administration Department
- Account Department
- Insurance Department
- Economics and Trading Department
- Business Foreign Language Department
- Information Administration and Engineering Department
- Law Department
- Social Science Department
- Physical Education Department
- Basic Department
- Continuing Education Department
- Foreign Language Department
- International Education College
