= Seventh-day Adventist education =

Christian school system

Seventh-day Adventist educational system
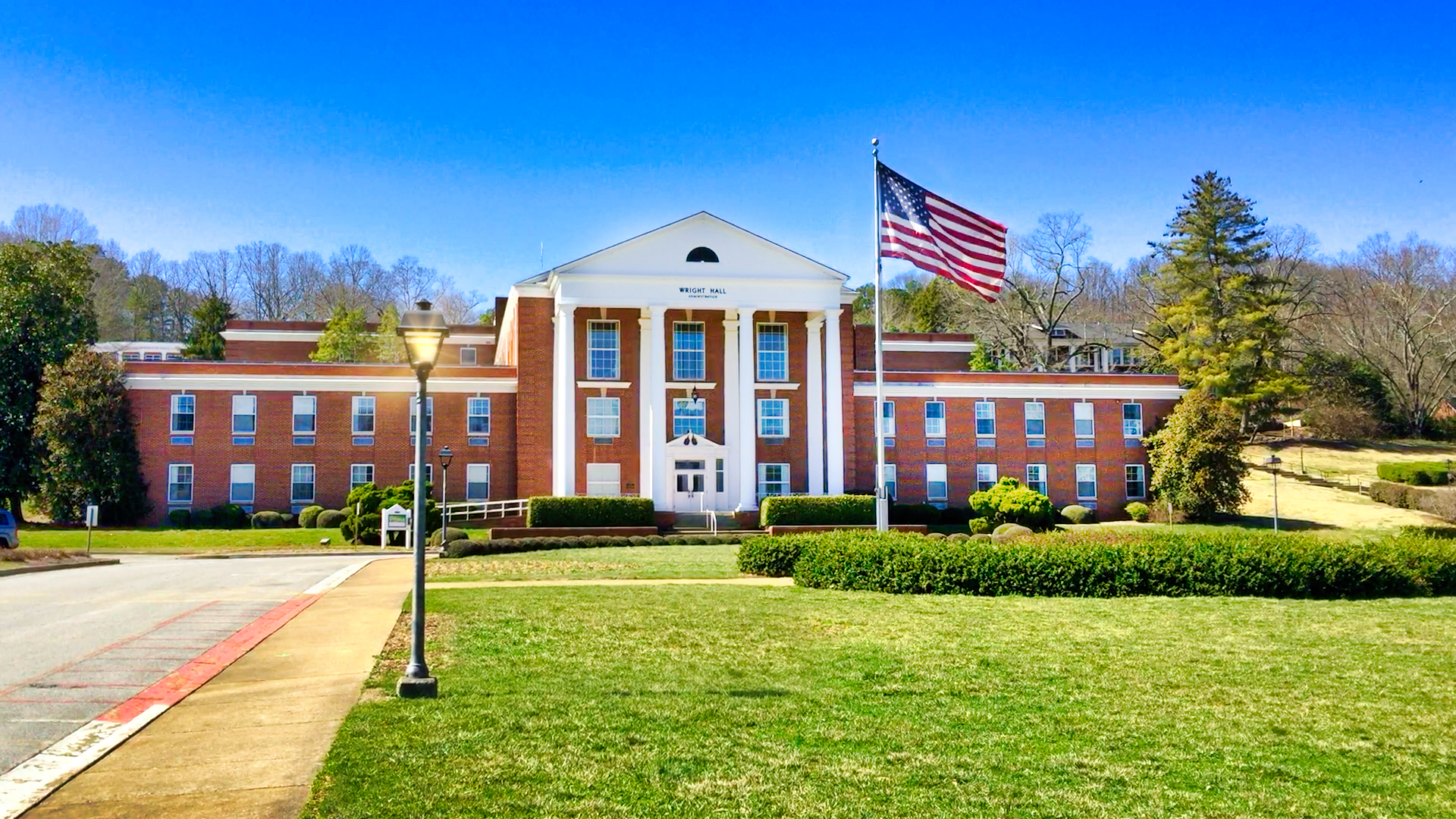
- Type: Religious/Non-Profit
- Location: Silver Spring, Maryland, US
- Region served: Worldwide
- Parent organization: General Conference of Seventh-day Adventists
- Website: education.adventist.org

The Seventh-day Adventist educational system, part of the Seventh-day Adventist Church, is overseen by the General Conference of Seventh-day Adventists located in Silver Spring, Maryland. It is considered as the largest Protestant educational system and second largest Christian educational system in the world. The educational system is a Christian school–based system.

In 2023, the Seventh-day Adventist Church has associations with a total of 9,845 educational institutions operating in over 100 countries around the world with over 2,177,933 million students worldwide.

The denominationally-based school system began in the 1870s.

== Statistics ==
In 2023, the Seventh-day Adventist Church has associations with a total of 9,845 educational institutions operating in over 100 countries around the world with over 2,177,933 million students worldwide.

=== Primary ===
There are 6,897 Primary Schools with 1,403,901 students.

=== Secondary ===
There are 2,793 Secondary Schools with 615,171 students.

=== Tertiary ===
There are 116 Tertiary Institutions with 148,775 students. The Adventist Church, usually through Union-level administrative units, is associated with post secondary educational institutions around the world, including training institutes, junior colleges and four-year universities, and medical schools, including those associated with Adventist hospitals.

== Education by area ==
=== North America ===
The North American Division Office of Education coordinates with 1,049 schools with 65,000 students in the United States, Canada, and Bermuda.

== See also ==
- List of Seventh-day Adventist secondary schools
- List of Seventh-day Adventist colleges and universities
