= Pacific Union College Academy basketball tournament =

The Pacific Union College Academy basketball tournament is a tournament for Seventh-day Adventist high schools, held every January or February at Pacific Union College.

The tournament attracts teams from California, but also other states.

Results:

Year	Champion	2nd place
2025	Paradise Adventist Academy	College View Academy
2024	Napa Christian**	PUC Prep
2023	Napa Christian	Loma Linda Academy
2022	Napa Christian	Rio Lindo Adventist Academy
2021	[tournament cancelled due to global COVID pandemic]	
2020	Mountain View Academy	Rio Lindo Adventist Academy
2019	American Christian Academy	Rio Lindo Adventist Academy
2018	Sacramento Adventist Academy	Rio Lindo Adventist Academy
2017	Rio Lindo Adventist Academy	Mountain View Academy
2016	Rio Lindo Adventist Academy	Loma Linda Academy
2015	Paradise Adventist Academy	Rio Lindo Adventist Academy
2014	Loma Linda Academy	Rogue Valley Adventist Academy
2013	Rogue Valley Adventist Academy	Loma Linda Academy
2012	Pleasant Hill Adventist Academy	Rogue Valley Adventist Academy
2011	Sacramento Adventist Academy	Pleasant Hill Adventist Academy
2010	Bakersfield Adventist Academy	Sacramento Adventist Academy
2009	PUC Prep	Monterey Bay Academy
2008	PUC Prep	Bakersfield Adventist Academy
2007	Bakersfield Adventist Academy	Lodi Academy
2006	Mountain View Academy	Sacramento Adventist Academy
2005	Rio Lindo Academy	Sacramento Adventist Academy
2004	Pacific Union College Prep	Auburn Adventist Academy
2003	Auburn Adventist Academy	Monterey Bay Academy
2002	Auburn Adventist Academy	Monterey Bay Academy
2001	Pacific Union College Prep	Monterey Bay Academy
2000	Portland Adventist Academy	Auburn Adventist Academy
