= List of Seventh-day Adventist secondary schools =

Seventh-day Adventists Educational System
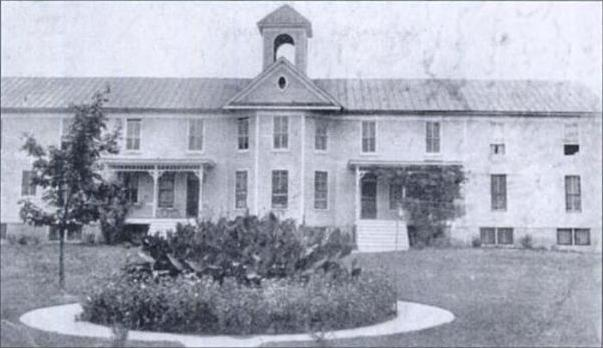
- Type: Religious/non-profit
- Location: Silver Spring, Maryland, United States
- Region served: Worldwide
- Parent organization: General Conference of Seventh-day Adventists
- Website: www.nadadventist.org

The Seventh-day Adventist Church runs a large educational system throughout the world. As of 2008, 1678 secondary schools are affiliated with the Church. Some schools offer both elementary and secondary education. They are a part of the Seventh-day Adventist education system, the world's second largest Christian school system.

== Southern Africa and Indian Ocean Division ==
=== Botswana ===
- Eastern Gate Academy, Francistown
- Emmanuel Adventist Academy, Molepolole
- Mogoditshane Adventist Primary, Mogoditshane
- Mountain View Adventist Academy, Mogoditshane

=== South Africa ===
- Aurum Seventh-Day Adventist Academy
- Bethel High School
- Blue Hills College
- Cancele Senior Secondary School
- Good Hope High School
- Good Hope Primary School
- Ginsberg Adventist Primary School
- Grahamstown Adventist School
- Helderberg Pre-primary, Primary, High School and University
- Hillcrest Primary School
- Keitsleigh Primary School
- New Brighton Adventist Primary School
- Paterson Park
- Presda
- Riverside Primary School
- Sedaven Primary and High School
- West Rand Sda Primary School

=== Zambia ===
- Emmanuel Adventist Secondary School in Chisamba
- Fordina Pandeli Secondary School in Mansa
- King's Highway primary and secondary school
- Mupapa Secondary School
- Rusangu Secondary School
- Rusangu University
- Riverside Secondary School

=== Zimbabwe ===
- Anderson Adventist High School, Gweru
- Anderson Adventist Primary School, Gweru
- Anderson Mutiweshiri Secondary, Mutiweshiri, Wedza
- Bemhiwa Primary School, Bocha
- Bulawayo Adventist Secondary School, Bulawayo
- Chikwariro Adventist High, Bocha
- Chinembiri Secondary
- Fairview Primary School, Bulawayo
- Gunde Primary and High School, Gweru
- Handina Adventist Primary and Secondary School, Nyazura
- Hanke Mission Primary and Secondary School, Shurugwi
- Karirwi Adventist Mission, Bocha
- Katsenga Secondary
- Lower Gwelo Primary, Secondary and High School, Lower Gwelo
- Lowveld Adventist Primary School, Chiredzi
- Mandora SDA Primary School, Mhondoro/Kadoma
- Maranatha Adventist High, Primary School, Bulawayo
- Marewo Primary School, Bocha
- Mauya Secondary School
- Mkhosana Adventist Secondary School, Victoria Falls
- Mtanki SDA Primary School, Gokwe
- Mukwada Primary and Secondary School (Bocha)
- Mutoranhanga SDA Primary School, Karoi)
- Nemane Adventist High School, Tsholotsho
- Nemane Adventist Primary School Tsholotsho
- Northwood Adventist Primary School, Mt Pleasant, Harare
- Nyahuni Adventist High School
- Nyazura Adventist Primary and High School, Nyazura
- Phelandaba Primary School, Bulawayo
- Ruya Adventist High School, Mount Darwin
- Shashane Adventist High School, Kezi
- Shashane Adventist Primary School, Kezi
- Solusi Primary, Secondary and High School Bulawayo
- Soluswe Adventist Primary, Tsholotsho
- Tshabanda Primary and Secondary School
- Zhombe SDA Primary School, Gokwe, Bomba Business Centre
- Waterfall Adventist High School, Harare

== East and Central Africa Division ==
=== Burundi ===
- Lycee Delhove de Buganda, Cibitoke
- Lycee Maranatha de Kivoga, Kivoga

=== Democratic Republic of the Congo ===
- Lukanga Adventist Institute, Butembo, Nord-Kivu
- Rwamiko Institute, Goma, Kivu
- Songa Institute, Kamina

=== Ethiopia ===
- Abonsa Seventh-day Adventist School, Durame/Abonsa
- Akaki Seventh-day Adventist School, Addis Ababa
- Durame Seventh-day Adventist School, Durame
- Kebena Seventh-day Adventist School, Addis Ababa
- Kuyera Adventist Academy, Shoa Region
- Wollega Adventist Academy, Gimbie

=== Kenya ===
- Chebwai Adventist Secondary School
- Chuka Adventist Secondary School, Tharaka Nithi, Meru
- Gatumbi SDA Primary and Secondary Schools, Kirinyaga County
- Kabokyek Adventist Secondary School, Kericho
- Kagwathi Adventist Secondary School, SabaSaba, Murang'a County
- Kamagambo High School and Teachers' College, Kisii County
- Kanga High School, Migori County
- Karura Church School, Nairobi
- Kiirua Adventist Secondary School, Meru
- Kimolwet Mixed Adventist Secondary School, Nandi County
- Kiriiria Seventh-day Adventist Secondary School, Meru, Kenya
- Kiutine Adventist Secondary School, Kiutine, Maua, Meru County
- Masii Seventh-day Adventist Secondary School, Masii
- Matutu Mixed Adventist Secondary School
- Maxwell Adventist Academy, Mbagathi, Nairobi
- Menyenya Mixed Adventist High School
- Mission in Action Adventist Day/Boarding Primary Jss Boarding School, Nakuru County
- Mutitu Seventh-day Adventist Secondary School, Kikima
- Mweiga Adventist Secondary School
- Nyambaria Adventist Secondary School
- Nyanchwa Adventist Secondary School, Kisii
- Nyangusu SDA Boarding Primary School
- Ombogo Girls' Academy, Homa Bay, Kenya
- Omobera SDA Girls' High School
- Ranen Mixed Adventist Secondary School, Awendo Kenya
- Rift Valley Adventist Secondary School, Molo
- Segero Baraton Adventist School, Baraton
- Segero Mixed Adventist Secondary School

=== Rwanda ===
- Gisenyi Adventist Secondary School, Gisenyi
- Gitwe Adventist Secondary School, Gitarama
- Karenge Adventist Secondary School, Rwamagana
- Rwankeri Adventist Secondary School

=== South Sudan ===
- Excel International Academy, Yei
- Eyira Adventist Vocational Academy, Maridi

=== Tanzania ===
- Alpha Adventist Schools, Kigoma
- Bupandagila Secondary School, Bariadi
- Busegwe Girls' Secondary School, Mara
- Bwasi Secondary School, Mara
- Canan Adventist Primary School, Arusha
- Chome Secondary School, Same
- Ikizu Secondary School, Musoma
- Iringa Adventist Secondary School, Iringa
- Kabuku Adventist Training College, Tanga
- Kameya Secondary School, Ukerewe
- Kitungwa Adventist Secondary School, Morogoro
- Kongowe Adventist Primary School, Pwani
- Mbeya Adventist Pre and Primary School, Mbeya
- Mbeya Adventist Secondary School, Mbeya
- Ndembela Secondary school, Tukuyu
- Nyabihore Secondary School, Mara
- Nyanza Adventist Secondary School, Mwanza
- Nyasincha Secondary School, Mara
- Parane Secondary School, Same
- Suji Secondary School, Same, Kilimanjaro
- Tanzania Adventist Primary School, Arusha
- Tanzania Adventist Secondary School, Arusha
- Temeke Adventist Schools, Dar es Salaam
- University of Arusha, Arusha

=== Uganda ===
- Bugema Adventist Secondary School
- Excel International Academy, Arua
- Greenfield Kids Foundation, Kabale
- Highfield Primary School, Wakiso
- Light College Katikamu, Luweero

== Northern Asia-Pacific Division ==
=== China ===
- Hong Kong Adventist Academy, Clear Water Bay, Sai Kung District, New Territories, Hong Kong
- Kowloon Sam Yuk Secondary School, Kowloon, Hong Kong
- Macao Sam Yuk Middle School, Taipa, Macau
- Tai Po Sam Yuk Secondary School, Tai Po, New Territories, Hong Kong

Closed:

- Hong Kong Sam Yuk Secondary School, Happy Valley, Hong Kong
- Sam Yuk Middle School, Sai Kung, New Territories, Hong Kong

=== Korea ===
- Anheung Foreign Language Adventist Academy
- Busan Sahmyook Elementary School
- Chuncheon Sahmyook Elementary School
- Daegu Sahmyook Elementary, Middle, and High School
- Daejeon Sahmyook Elementary, and Middle School
- Gwangju Sahmyook Elementary School
- Hankook Sahmyook Middle, and High School
- Honam Sahmyook Middle, and High School
- Seohae Sahmyook Elementary, Middle, and High School
- Seoul Sahmyook Elementary, Middle, and High School
- Taegang Sahmyook Elementary School
- Wonju Sahmyook Elementary, Middle, and High School
- Yeongnam Sahmyook Middle, and High School

=== Taiwan ===
- The Primacy Collegiate Academy (9-12), Taipei, Taiwan
- Taipei Adventist American School (K-8), Taipei, Taiwan
- Taiwan Adventist International School (7-12), Yuchih, Nantou County, Taiwan

Closed:

- Da Jin Adventist Secondary School, Pin Dong, Taiwan

== Inter-American Division ==
=== Antigua ===
- Antigua and Barbuda Seventh-Day Adventist Primary School
- Antigua and Barbuda Seventh-day Adventist School, St. John's
- New Bethel Academy
- S.D.A. Early-Childhood Development Center

=== Bahamas ===
- Bahamas Academy of Seventh Day Adventist, Nassau, New Providence
- Grand Bahama Academy, Freeport, Grand Bahama

=== Barbados ===
- Barbados Seventh-day Adventist Secondary School, Dalkeith, St. Michael

=== Belize ===
- Belize Adventist Junior College, Calcutta, Corozal District
- Canaan Seventh Day Adventist College, Belize City, Belize District
- Eden Seventh Day Adventist High School Santa Elena, Cayo District
- Providence Seventh Day Adventist High School, San Antonio, Toledo District
- Valley of Peace Seventh Day Adventist Academy, Valley of Peace, BMP Cayo District

=== Cayman Islands ===
- Cayman Academy, George Town, Grand Cayman

=== Colombia ===
- Instituto Colombo-Venezolano, Medellín, Antioquia

=== Costa Rica ===
- UNADECA, Alajuela

=== Dominica ===
- Dominica Seventh-day Adventist Secondary School, Portsmouth, Commonwealth of Dominica

=== Dominican Republic ===
- Adventist Dominican Academy, Bonao
- Las Americas Adventist Academy, Azua
- Fanny Lopez Adventist Academy, Santo Domingo
- Los Girasoles Adventist Academy, Santo Domingo
- Juan Pablo Duarte Adventist Academy, Barahona
- Maranatha Adventist Academy, Santo Domingo
- Maria Trinidad Sanchez Adventist Academy, Romana
- Metropolitan Adventist Academy, Santo Domingo
- Ozama Adventist Academy, Santo Domingo
- La Paz Adventist Academy, Santo Domingo

=== Grenada (Isle of Spice) ===
- Grenada Seventh-day Adventist Comprehensive School, Mt. Rose, St Patric

=== Haiti ===
- College Adventiste du Cap-Haïtien
- Collège Adventiste de Diquini
- Collège Adventiste des Gonaïves
- Collège Adventiste de Morija
- Collège Adventiste de Pétion-Ville
- Collège Adventiste de Vertière
- Institut Adventiste Franco-Haïtien

=== Jamaica ===
- Harrison's Memorial High School, Montego Bay
- Kingsway High School, Kingston
- May Pen High School, Clarendon
- Port Maria High School, St Mary
- Portland High School, Portland
- St Ann's Bay High School, St Ann
- Savanna-la-mar High, Westmoreland
- Victor Dixon High School, Mandeville
- Willowdene High School, Spanish Town

=== Panama ===
- Colegio Adventista Bilingue de David, Chiriquí
- Colegio Adventista Metropolitano, Panama City
- Seventh Day Adventist Institute IAP, Chiriquí

=== Puerto Rico ===
- Bella Vista Academy, Mayagüez
- Central Adventist Academy, Caguas
- Central Adventist Academy, San Sebastian
- East Adventist Academy, Rio Grande
- Ellen+Miller (FEDIINS) Academy, San Juan
- Metropolitan Adventist Academy, San Juan
- North Adventist Academy, Arecibo
- North Adventist Regional Academy, Vega Baja
- Northwestern Adventist Academy, Aguadilla
- South Adventist Academy, Guayama
- Southern Adventist Academy, Ponce
- Southwestern Adventist Academy, Sabana Grande
- Western Adventist Academy (Academia Adventista del Oeste), Mayagüez

=== Dutch Caribbean ===
- Seventh-Day Adventist School, St. Eustatius

=== St. Lucia ===
- St. Lucia Seventh-day Adventist Academy, Castries

=== St. Vincent & the Grenadines ===
- Bequia Seventh Day Adventist Secondary School, Port Elizabeth
- Mountain View Adventist Academy, Richland Park, Charlotte

=== Trinidad & Tobago ===
- Bates Memorial High School, Sangre Grande
- Caribbean Union College Secondary School, Maracas-St.Joseph
- Harmon School of S.D.A., Tobago
- Pinehaven S.D.A. Primary School, Arima
- Rio Claro S.D.A. Primary School, Rio Claro
- Southern Academy, San Fernando

== North American Division ==
=== Bermuda ===
- Bermuda Institute, Southampton

=== Alberta (12) ===
- Chinook Winds Adventist Academy, Calgary
- Coralwood Adventist Academy, Edmonton
- College Heights Christian School, Lacombe
- Higher Ground Christian School, Medicine Hat
- Mamawi Atosketan Native School, Ponoka
- Parkview Adventist Academy, Lacombe
- Peace Hills Adventist School, Wetaskiwin
- Prairie Adventist Christian eSchool, Lacombe
- South Side Christian School, Red Deer
- Sylvan Meadows Adventist School, Sylvan Lake
- Woodlands Adventist School, Ponoka

=== British Columbia (14) ===
- Avalon Adventist Junior Academy, Port Hardy
- Bella Coola Adventist School, Bella Coola
- Cariboo Adventist Academy, Williams Lake
- Chilliwack Adventist Christian School, Chilliwack
- Deer Lake School, Burnaby
- Fountainview Academy, Aldergrove
- Lakeview Christian School, Victoria
- North Okanagan Jr. Academy, Armstrong
- Okanagan Christian School, Kelowna
- Peace Christian School, Chetwynd
- Pleasant Valley Christian Academy, Vernon
- Robson Valley Junior Academy, McBride
- Shuswap Seventh-day Adventist School, Salmon Arm
- West Coast Adventist Christian School, Abbotsford

=== Manitoba (1) ===
- Red River Valley Junior Academy, Winnipeg

=== Nova Scotia (1) ===
- Sandy Lake Academy, Bedford

=== Ontario (10) ===
- Adventist Christian Elementary School, London
- College Park Elementary School (Oshawa, Ontario), Oshawa
- Crawford Adventist Academy, Toronto
- Crawford Adventist Academy East, Pickering
- Crawford Adventist Academy – Peel Campus, Caledon
- Grandview Adventist Academy, Mount Hope
- Kingsway College, Oshawa
- Near North Adventist Christian School, Barrie
- Ottawa Adventist School, Ottawa
- Peel Adventist Elementary School, Brampton
- Windsor Adventist Elementary School, Windsor

=== Quebec (2) ===
- Greaves Adventist Academy, Montreal
- Sartigan Adventist Academy (Académie Adventiste de Sartigan), Saint-Georges

=== Saskatchewan (3) ===
- Curtis-Horne Christian School, Regina
- Rosthern Christian School, Rosthern
- Seventh-day Adventist Christian School, Saskatoon

Not Church-owned but affiliated:

- Fountainview Academy, Lillooet, British Columbia
- Grandview Adventist Academy, Mount Hope, Ontario

=== United States ===
School	State	City	Grades
Adventist Christian Academy of Texas	Texas	Conroe	PreK-12
Andrews Academy	Michigan	Berrien Springs	9-12
Armona Union Academy	California	Armona	K-12
Atlanta Adventist Academy	Georgia	Duluth	9-12
Auburn Adventist Academy	Washington	Auburn	9-12
Bakersfield Adventist Academy	California	Bakersfield	K-12
Baltimore White Marsh Adventist School	Maryland	Baltimore	K-10
Bass Memorial Academy	Mississippi	Lumberton	9-12
Battle Creek Academy	Michigan	Battle Creek	K-12
Blue Mountain Academy	Pennsylvania	Hamburg	9-12
Brighton Adventist Academy	Colorado	Brighton	K-9
Burton Adventist Academy	Texas	Arlington	PreK-12
Calexico Mission School	California	Calexico	K-12
Campion Academy	Colorado	Loveland	9-12
Carolina Adventist Academy	North Carolina	Whiteville	K-12
Cascade Christian Academy	Washington	Wenatchee	K-12
Castle Valley Academy	Utah	Castle Valley	9-12
Central Valley Christian Academy	California	Ceres	K-12
Central Vermont Academy	Vermont	Barre	K-12
Chisholm Trail Academy	Texas	Keene	9-12
College View Academy	Nebraska	Lincoln	PreK-12
Collegedale Academy	Tennessee	Collegedale	PreK-12
Columbia Adventist Academy	Washington	Battle Ground	9-12
Dakota Adventist Academy	North Dakota	Bismarck	9-12
East Pasco Adventist Academy	Florida	Dade City	PreK-10
El Dorado Adventist School	California	Placerville	K-12
Emerald Christian Academy	Oregon	Pleasant Hill	PreK-10
Escondido Adventist Academy	California	Escondido	K-12
Fletcher Academy	North Carolina	Fletcher	9-12
Forest Lake Academy	Florida	Apopka	9-12
Fresno Adventist Academy	California	Fresno	K-12
Gem State Academy	Idaho	Caldwell	9-12
Georgia-Cumberland Academy	Georgia	Calhoun	9-12
Glendale Adventist Academy	California	Glendale	K-12
Grand Rapids Adventist Academy	Michigan	Grand Rapids	K-12
Great Lakes Adventist Academy	Michigan	Cedar Lake	9-12
Great Plains Academy – closed	Kansas	Enterprise	9-12
Greater Atlanta Adventist Academy	Georgia	Atlanta	9-12
Greater Miami Adventist Academy	Florida	Miami	K-12
Greater New York Academy	New York	Woodside	9-12
Greeneville Adventist Academy	Tennessee	Greeneville	PreK-10 (11-12 online)
Harbert Hills Academy	Tennessee	Savannah	9-12
Hawaiian Mission Academy	Hawaii	Honolulu	9-12
Highland Academy	Tennessee	Portland	9-12
Highland Adventist School	West Virginia	Elkins	PreK-12
Highland View Academy	Maryland	Hagerstown	9-12
Hinsdale Adventist Academy	Illinois	Hinsdale	PreK-12
Holbrook Adventist Indian School	Arizona	Holbrook	1-12
Houston Adventist Academy	Texas	Cypress	PreK-12
Indiana Academy	Indiana	Cicero	9-12
Knoxville Adventist School	Tennessee	Knoxville	K-9
La Sierra Academy	California	Riverside	K-12
Lake City Academy	Idaho	Coeur d'Alene	PreK-12
Lake Nelson Adventist Academy	New Jersey	Piscataway, New Jersey	Prek-12
Las Vegas Jr. Academy	Nevada	Nevada	K-10
Laurelbrook Academy	Tennessee	Dayton	9-12
Laurelwood Academy	Oregon	Jasper	9-12
Life Changing Christian Academy	Florida	Eustis	K-10
Little Rock Adventist Academy	Arkansas	Little Rock	K-10
Livingstone Adventist Academy	Oregon	Salem	K-12
Lodi Academy	California	Lodi	9-12
Loma Linda Academy	California	Loma Linda	PreK-12
Los Angeles Adventist Academy	California	Los Angeles	K-12
Louisville Adventist Academy	Kentucky	Louisville	PreK-12
Madison Academy	Tennessee	Madison	9-12
Maplewood Academy	Minnesota	Hutchinson	9-12
Memphis Adventist Academy	Tennessee	Memphis	PK-10
Mesa Grande Academy	California	Calimesa	K-12
Metropolitan Junior Academy	Michigan	Plymouth	1-10
Miami Union Academy	Florida	Miami	PreK-12
Midland Adventist Academy	Kansas	Shawnee	K-12
Mile High Academy	Colorado	Denver	PreK-12
Milo Adventist Academy	Oregon	Days Creek	9-12
Monterey Bay Academy	California	La Selva Beach	9-12
Mother Lode Adventist Junior Academy	California	Sonora	K-10
Mount Ellis Academy	Montana	Bozeman	9-12
Mount Pisgah Academy	North Carolina	Candler	9-12
Mountain View Academy	California	Mountain View	9-12
Napa Christian Campus of Education	California	Napa	K-12
Naples Adventist Christian School	Florida	Naples	K-8, 9-12 online only
Newbury Park Academy	California	Newbury Park	9-12
North Dallas Adventist Academy	Texas	Richardson	PreK-12
Northeastern Academy	New York	Manhattan	9-12
Northeastern Academy Brooklyn Campus	New York	Brooklyn	9-12
Oakwood Adventist Academy	Alabama	Hunstville	K-12
Oklahoma Academy	Oklahoma	Harrah	9-12
Orangewood Academy	California	Garden Grove	PreK-12
Orcas Christian School	Washington	Eastsound	K-12
Orlando Junior Academy	Florida	Orlando	PreK-12
Ouachita Hills Academy	Arkansas	Amity	9-12
Ozark Adventist Academy	Arkansas	Gentry	9-12
Pacific Union College Preparatory School	California	Angwin	9-12
Paradise Adventist Academy	California	Paradise	K-12
Peterson-Warren Academy	Michigan	Inkster	PreK-12
Pine Forge Academy	Pennsylvania	Pine Forge	9-12
Pine Hills Adventist Academy	California	Auburn	K-12
Pine Tree Academy	Maine	Freeport	PreK-12
Pleasant Hill Adventist Academy	California	Pleasant Hill	PreK-12
Port Charlotte Adventist School	Florida	Port Charlotte	K-10
Portland Adventist Academy	Oregon	Portland	9-12
Puget Sound Adventist Academy	Washington	Kirkland	9-12
Raleigh Adventist Christian Academy	North Carolina	Raleigh	K-12
Ramah Junior Academy	Georgia	Savannah	PreK-8
Redding Adventist Academy	California	Redding	K-10
Redlands Adventist Academy	California	Redlands	K-12
Redwood Adventist Academy	California	Santa Rosa	K-12
Richmond Academy	Virginia	Richmond	PreK-12
Rio Lindo Academy	California	Healdsburg	9-12
Riverview Memorial School	Maine	Norridgewock	PreK-10
Rogue Valley Adventist School	Oregon	Medford	K-12
Sacramento Adventist Academy	California	Sacramento	PreK-12
St. Croix Seventh-day Adventist School	Virgin Islands	St. Croix	K-12
St. Thomas-St. John Seventh-day Adventist School	Virgin Islands	St. Thomas	K-12
San Diego Academy	California	National City	K-12
San Fernando Valley Academy	California	Northridge	K-12
San Gabriel Academy	California	San Gabriel	K-12
Sandia View Academy	New Mexico	Corrales	9-12
Shenandoah Valley Academy	Virginia	New Market	9-12
Skagit Adventist Academy	Washington	Burlington	K-12
South Lancaster Academy	Massachusetts	South Lancaster	PreK-12
South Texas Christian Academy	Texas	McAllen	K-12
Spencerville Adventist Academy	Maryland	Silver Spring	PreK-12
Spring Valley Academy	Ohio	Centerville	K-12
Sunnydale Adventist Academy	Missouri	Centralia	9-12
Takoma Academy	Maryland	Takoma Park	9-12
Takoma Academy Preparatory School	Maryland	Takoma Park	K-12
Thunderbird Adventist Academy	Arizona	Scottsdale	9-12
Tri-City Adventist School	Washington	Pasco	PreK-10
Tualatin Valley Academy	Oregon	Hillsboro	PreK-10
Union Springs Academy	New York	Union Springs	9-12
Upper Columbia Academy	Washington	Spangle	9-12
Valley Grande Adventist Academy	Texas	Weslaco	K-12
Valley View Adventist Academy	California	Arroyo Grande	K-10
Walker Memorial Academy	Florida	Avon Park	K-12
Walla Walla Valley Academy	Washington	College Place	9-12
Wisconsin Academy	Wisconsin	Columbus	9-12

== South America Division ==
=== Argentina ===
- Alta Gracia Adventist Academy, Posadas, Misiones
- Bahía Blanca Adventist Academy, Bahía Blanca, Buenos Aires Province
- Balcarce Adventist Academy, Balcarce, Buenos Aires Province
- Capitan Bermudez Adventist Academy, Capitán Bermúdez, Santa Fe Province
- Córdoba Adventist Academy, Córdoba
- Florida Adventist Academy, Florida, Buenos Aires Province
- Formosa Adventist Academy, Formosa
- Mariano Moreno Adventist Academy, Posadas, Misiones
- Mendoza Adventist Academy, Mendoza
- Moron Adventist Academy, Morón, Buenos Aires Province
- North Argentine Academy, Leandro N. Alem, Misiones
- Parana Adventist Institute, Parana, Entre Ríos
- Los Polvorines Adventist Academy, Los Polvorines, Buenos Aires Province
- Puerto Iguazú Adventist Academy, Puerto Iguazu, Misiones
- Resistencia Adventist Academy, Resistencia, Chaco
- River Plate Adventist University Academy, Libertador San Martin, Entre Ríos
- Salta Adventist Academy, Salta
- Santa Fe Adventist Academy, Santa Fe
- Villa Regina Adventist Academy, Villa Regina, Río Negro

=== Bolivia ===
- Bolivia Adventist University Academy, Vinto, Cochabamba
- Los Andes Adventist Academy, La Paz

=== Brazil ===
- Adventist Agricultural-Industrial Academy, Manaus, AM
- Adventist School, Cachoeirinha, RS
- Adventist School, Pelotas, RS
- Agro-Industrial Adventist Trans-Amazon Academy, Uruara, PA
- Anápolis Adventist School, Anápolis, GO
- Arruda Adventist Academy, Recife, PE
- Belo Horizonte Adventist Academy, Belo Horizonte, MG
- Boqueirao Seventh-day Adventist School, Curitiba, PR
- Brazil Adventist University Academy, Engenheiro Coelho, Engenheiro Coelho, SP
- Brazil Adventist University Academy, Hortolandia, Hortolandia, SP
- Brazil Adventist University Academy, São Paulo, São Paulo, SP
- Campo Grande Adventist Academy, Rio de Janeiro, RJ
- Campo Mourao Seventh-day Adventist School, Campo Mourão, PR
- Cascavel Seventh-day Adventist School, Cascavel, PR
- Castelo Branco Adventist Academy, Salvador, BA
- Central Brazil Academy, Abadiania, GO
- Cruzeiro do Sul Adventist Academy, Taquara, RS
- Elza Gutzeit Adventist Academy of Altamira, Altamira, PA
- Espirito Santo Academy, Colatina, ES
- Eunapolis Adventist Academy, Eunapolis, BA
- Fortaleza Adventist Academy, Fortaleza, CE
- Foz do Iguaçu Seventh-day Adventist School, Foz do Iguaçu, PR
- Goiânia Adventist School, Goiânia, GO
- Grao Para Adventist Academy, Belém, PA
- Gravatai Seventh-day Adventist School, Gravatai, RS
- Imperatriz Adventist Academy, Imperatriz, MA
- Ipatinga Adventist Academy, Ipatinga, MG
- Itaborai Adventist Academy, Itaboraí, RJ
- Itabuna Adventist Secondary School, Itabuna, BA
- Jacarepagua Adventist Academy, Rio de Janeiro, RJ
- Jardim Europa Adventist School, Goiânia, GO
- Ji-Parana Adventist Academy, Ji-Paraná, RO
- Londrina Seventh-day Adventist School, Londrina, PR
- Maceio Adventist Academy, Maceio, AL
- Manaus Adventist Academy, Manaus, AM
- Maraba Adventist Academy, Marabá, PA
- Marechal Rondon Seventh-day Adventist School, Porto Alegre, RS
- Maringa Seventh-day Adventist School, Maringá, PR
- Minas Gerais Adventist Academy, Lavras, MG
- New City Adventist Academy, Ananindeua, PA
- Northeast Brazil Academy, Cachoeira, BA
- Novo Hamburgo Seventh-day Adventist School, Novo Hamburgo, RS
- Novo Mundo Adventist School, Goiânia, GO
- Parana Adventist Academy, Ivatuba, Parana
- Partenon Seventh-day Adventist School, Porto Alegre, RS
- Paul Bernard Adventist Academy, Manaus, AM
- Pedro Ludovico Adventist School, Goiânia, GO
- Petropolis Adventist Academy, Petropolis, RJ
- Porangatu Adventist School, Porangatu, GO
- Portão Seventh-day Adventist School, Curitiba, PR
- Porto Alegre Seventh-day Adventist School, Porto Alegre, RS
- Porto Velho Adventist Academy, Porto Velho, RO
- Recife Adventist Academy, Recife, PE
- Rio Branco Adventist Academy, Rio Branco, AC
- Rio de Janeiro Adventist Academy, Rio de Janeiro, RJ
- Rio Verde Adventist School, Rio Verde, Goiás, GO
- Salvador Adventist Academy (Villa El Salvador), Salvador, BA
- Santa Catarina Adventist Academy, Araquari, SC
- Sao Luiz Adventist Academy, São Luís, MA
- Sarandi Seventh-day Adventist Elementary School, Porto Alegre, RS
- Tucuma Adventist Academy, Tucuma, PA
- Uruaçu Adventist School, Uruaçu, GO
- Viamao Seventh-day Adventist School, Viamão, RS
- Vila Nova Adventist School, Goiânia, GO
- Vitoria Adventist Academy, Vitoria, ES
- West Amazon Adventist Academy, Mirante da Serra, RO

=== Chile ===
- Los Ángeles Adventist Academy (Chile), Camino Antuco, Los Ángeles
- Angol Adventist Academy, Villa Ecal, Angol
- Antofagasta Adventist Academy, Antofagasta
- Arica Adventist Academy, Arica
- Buenaventura Adventist Academy, Santiago
- Calama Adventist Academy, Calama
- Chile Adventist University Academy, Chillán
- La Cisterna Academy, Santiago
- Concepción Adventist Academy (Chile), Concepción
- Las Condes Adventist Academy, Las Condes, Santiago
- Copiapo Adventist Academy, Copiapó
- Molina Adventist Academy, Molina
- North Santiago Academy, Santiago
- Osorno Adventist Academy, Osorno
- Porvenir Adventist Academy, Santiago
- Puerto Montt Adventist Academy, Puerto Montt
- Punta Arenas Adventist Academy, Punta Arenas
- Quilpue Adventist Academy, Quilpué
- La Serena Adventist Academy, La Serena
- South Santiago Adventist Academy, Santiago
- Talcahuano Adventist Academy, Huertos Familiares, Talcahuano
- Temuco Adventist Academy, Villa Los Cradores, Temuco
- Valdivia Adventist Academy, Valdivia
- West Santiago Adventist Academy, Lo Prado, Santiago

=== Ecuador ===
- Ecuador Adventist Superior Technical Institute Secondary School, Santo Domingo de los Colorados, Pichincha
- Pacific Adventist Academy, Guayaquil
- Quito Adventist Academy, Quito

=== Paraguay ===
- Asunción Adventist Academy, Asunción
- East Paraguay Adventist Academy, Distrito Yguazú, Depto. Alto Paraná

=== Peru ===
- 28 de Julio Adventist College, Tacna
- Amazonas Adventist College, Iquitos
- Brasil Adventist College, Jesús María, Lima
- Daniel Alcides Carrión Adventist College, La Esperanza, Trujillo
- Eduardo F. Forga Adventist College, Arequipa
- José Pardo Adventist College, Cuzco
- José de San Martín Adventist College, Trujillo
- Miraflores Adventist College, Miraflores, Lima
- Portales del Saber Adventist College, Ate, Lima
- El Porvenir Adventist College, Chepén, Trujillo
- Salvador Adventist College, Villa El Salvador, Lima
- Ucayali Adventist College, Pucallpa, Ucayali
- Unión Adventist College, Chaclacayo, Lima
- Unión Americana Adventist College, Ica

=== Uruguay ===
- Montevideo Adventist Academy, Montevideo, Montevideo
- Uruguay Adventist Academy, Progreso, Canelones

== South Pacific Division ==
=== Australia ===
- Avondale School (Cooranbong), NSW
- Blue Hills College, Goonellabah, NSW
- Border Christian College, Thurgoona, NSW
- Brisbane Adventist College, Mansfield, Qld
- Carlisle Adventist Christian College, Beaconsfield, Qld
- Carmel Adventist College, Perth, WA
- Central Coast Adventist School, Erina, NSW
- Darling Downs Christian School, Toowoomba, Qld
- Edinburgh College, Lilydale, Vic
- Gilson College, Taylors Hill, Vic
- Gold Coast Christian College, Reedy Creek, Qld
- Henderson College, Irymple, Vic
- Heritage College, Narre Warren South, Vic
- Hilliard Christian School, West Moonah, Tas
- Hills Adventist College, Sydney, NSW
- Macarthur Adventist College, Macquarie Fields, NSW
- Macquarie College, Wallsend, NSW
- Mountain View Adventist College, Doonside, NSW
- Noosa Adventist College, Cooroy, Qld
- North West Christian School, Penguin, Tas
- Northpine Christian College, Dakabin, Qld
- Nunawading Christian College, Nunawading, Vic
- Prescott Schools including Prescott College, Prospect, SA
- Sydney Adventist College, Strathfield, NSW
- Tweed Valley Adventist College, Murwillumbah, NSW
- Wahroonga Adventist School, Wahroonga, NSW

Not owned by the Church but affiliated:

- Karalundi College, Meekatharra, WA

=== Cook Islands ===
- Papaaroa High School, Rarotonga

=== Fiji ===
- Fulton University (modern name), Sabeto, Nadi
- Lautoka ADventist Primary School, Lautoka
- Naqia Adventist Primary School, Naqia
- Navesau Adventist High School, Wainibuka, Wainibuka
- Suva Adventist College, Lami, Suva
- Suva Adventist Primary School, Lami, Suva
- Vatuvonu Adventist High School, Natewa, Vanua Levu

=== French Polynesia ===
- Tiarama Adventist College, Papeete, Tahiti

=== Kiribati ===
- Kauma Adventist High School, Tarawa

=== Marshall Islands ===
- Delap SDA School
- Ebeye SDA School

=== New Zealand ===
- Auckland Seventh-day Adventist High School, Auckland
- Christchurch Adventist School, Christchurch
- Longburn Adventist College, Palmerston North
- Southland Adventist Christian School, Invercargill

=== Papua New Guinea ===
- Devare Adventist High School, Arawa, Bougainville
- Inonda Adventist Junior High School, Popondetta, Oro Province
- Kabiufa Adventist Secondary School, Goroka, Eastern Highlands Province
- Kambubu Adventist Secondary School, Rabaul, East New Britain Province
- Koiari Park Adventist High School, Port Moresby, National Capital District
- Mount Diamond Adventist Secondary School, Central Province
- Paglum Adventist High School, Mount Hagen, Western Highlands Province

=== Samoa ===
- Samoa Adventist College, Apia

=== American Samoa ===
- Iakina Adventist Academy, Pago Pago

=== Solomon Islands ===
- Afutara Adventist Vocational School, Auki, Malaita
- Batuna Adventist Vocational School, Marovo Lagoon
- Betikama Adventist College, Guadalcanal
- Kukudu Adventist College, Western Province

=== Tonga ===
- Beulah College, Tongatapu

=== Vanuatu ===
- Aore Adventist Academy, Santo
- Epauto Adventist High School, Efate

== South Asia-Pacific Division ==
=== Sri Lanka ===
- Adventist International School, Negombo

=== Cambodia ===
- Cambodia Adventist School, Phnom Penh

Church-owned but managed by SALT Ministries:

- Adventist International School Siem Reap, Siem Reap

=== Indonesia ===
School	Province	City/regency	Grades
Air Bersih Adventist Academy	North Sumatra	Medan	10-11
Balikpapan Adventist Academy	East Kalimantan	Balikpapan	
Bandung Adventist Academy	West Java	Naripan, Bandung	K-12
Bandung Adventist School	West Java	Setiabudi, Bandung	K-9
Bitung Adventist Academy		Bitung	
Cimindi Adventist Academy	West Java	Cimindi	K-12
East Java Adventist Academy	East Java	Pasuruan	
Irianjaya Adventist Academy	Papua		
Jakarta Adventist Academy	DKI Jakarta	Kramat Pulo, Jakarta	1-12
Kaima Adventist Academy			
Lau Rakit Adventist Academy	North Sumatra	Tanah Karo	
Klabat Adventist Academy	North Sulawesi	Airmadidi, Manado	K-12
Makarios School	DKI Jakarta	Kembangan, Jakarta Barat	K-9
Malang Adventist Academy		Malang	
Maluku Adventist Academy		Ambon	
Medan Adventist Academy		Jalan Veteran, Medan	
North Sulawesi Adventist Academy		Minahasa	
Nusa Tenggara Adventist Academy			
Palu Adventist Academy		Palu	
Pasir Putih Adventist Academy	Riau	Pekanbaru	
Pematang Siantar Adventist Academy	North Sumatera	Jalan Nias, Pematang Siantar	
Salemba Adventist Academy	DKI Jakarta	Jakarta Pusat	
Semarang Adventist Academy		Semarang	
Simbolon Adventist Academy	North Sumatera		
Simodong Adventist School	North Sumatra	Simodong, Asahan	1-9
SLA Martoba Adventist Academy	North Sumatra	Simpang Rami, Pematang Siantar	1-12
Sukabumi Adventist Academy			
Sumbul Pegagan Adventist Academy	North Sumatera	Sumbul Pegagan, Dairi	1-12
Surabaya Adventist Academy	East Java	Surabaya	K-12
Tanjung Kalau Adventist Academy	North Sumatera		
Toraja View Adventist Academy	South Sulawesi	Mebali Tana Toraja	

=== Malaysia ===
==== Sabah ====
- Goshen Adventist Secondary School, Kota Marudu
- Sabah Adventist Secondary School, Tamparuli

Primary schools

- Adventist Primary School Bambangan, Kota Marudu
- Adventist Primary School Damai, Kota Marudu
- Adventist Primary School Gaur, Kota Belud
- Adventist Primary School Goshen, Kota Marudu
- Adventist Primary School Kalawat, Kota Belud
- Adventist Primary School Marabau, Kudat
- Adventist Primary School Rangalau, Kota Belud
- Adventist Primary School Sungoi, Kota Marudu
- Adventist Primary School Tagaroh, Kota Marudu
- Adventist Primary School Tambuluran, Kota Marudu
- Adventist Primary School Tamparuli
- Adventist Primary School Tenghilan, Tamparuli

==== Sarawak ====
- Ayer Manis School, Serian
- Sunny Hill School, Kuching

=== Philippines ===
School	Municipality/town/city	Province	Grades
Adventist Academy Bacolod (formerly known as Negros Mission Academy)	Bacolod	Negros Occidental	7-12
Adventist Academy Cebu (formerly known as East Visayan Academy)	Talisay	Cebu	7-12
Adventist Academy Iloilo (formerly known as West Visayan Academy)	Pototan	Iloilo	7-10
Adventist International Institute of Advanced Studies (AIIAS) – Academy	Silang	Cavite	7-12
Adventist Medical Center College-Iligan	Iligan	Lanao del Norte	7 - college
Adventist Mission Academy of Romblon (AMAR)	Odiongan	Romblon	7-12
Adventist University of the Philippines Academy	Silang	Cavite	7-12
Baesa Adventist Academy	Caloocan		7-12
Baguio Adventist Academy	Baguio	Benguet	7-12
Baguio Seventh-day Adventist School	Baguio	Benguet	7-12
Banahaw View Academy	Lucban	Quezon	7-12
Central Bukidnon Institute	Valencia	Bukidnon	7-10
Central Luzon Adventist Academy	Floridablanca	Pampanga	7-12
Central Philippine Adventist College	Murcia	Negros Occidental	7 - college
Concepcion Adventist Academy	Concepcion	Ilocos Sur	7-12
D-SHEP Foundation Academy	Sablayan	Occidental Mindoro	7-12
East Visayan Adventist Academy	Javier	Leyte	7-12
Lake View Academy	Don Carlos	Bukidnon	7-12
Lipa Adventist Academy	Lipa	Batangas	7-12
Matutum View Academy	Tupi	South Cotabato	7-12
Mindanao Mission Academy	Manticao	Misamis Oriental	7-12
Mountain View College Academy	Valencia	Bukidnon	7-12
Naga View Adventist College Academy	Naga	Camarines Sur	7-12
Northeast Luzon Adventist College	Alicia	Isabela	7 - college
Northeastern Mindanao Academy	Butuan	Agusan del Norte	7-12
Northern Luzon Adventist College	Sison	Pangasinan	7-College
Palawan Adventist Academy	Narra	Palawan	7-12
Palawan Adventist School, Inc. (Academy)	Puerto Princesa	Palawan	7-10
Partido Mission Academy	Tigaon	Camarines Sur	7-10
Pasay City Academy	Pasay		7-10
Polillo Adventist Institute	Polillo	Quezon	7-10
River View Adventist Academy	La Paz, Iloilo City	Iloilo	7-10
San Jose Adventist Academy Inc.	San Jose	Occidental Mindoro	7-10
South Philippine Adventist College Academy	Matanao	Davao del Sur	7-12
Spring View Adventist Academy	San Antonio	Northern Samar	7-10
Sta. Elena Adventist Academy	Santa Elena	Camarines Norte	7-10
Tirad View Academy	Quirino	Ilocos Sur	7-12
Western Mindanao Academy	Dumingag	Zamboanga del Sur	7-12
Zamboanga Peninsula Adventist Academy	Zamboanga City		7-10

=== Singapore ===
- San Yu Adventist School

=== Thailand ===
- Adventist Ekamai School, Bangkok
- Adventist International Mission School, Muak Lek
- Bangkok Advent School
- Bangkok Adventist International School, Bangkok
- Chiangmai Adventist Academy, Chiang Mai
- Eden Valley Academy, Tak
- Ekamai International School, Bangkok
- Karen Adventist Academy, Mae Hong Son
- Korat Adventist International School, Nakhon Ratchasima
- Ramkhamhaeng Advent International School, Bangkok
- Them Amnuay Vithaya, Phuket
- Thep Amnuay Hat Yai School, Songkhla
- Trinity International School, Bangkok

== India ==
- Adventpuram Seventh-day Adventist School, Thiruvananthapuram, Kerala
- Ambalavayal Seventh-day Adventist School, Wayanad, Kerala
- Azamnagar Seventh-day Adventist High School, Belgaum, Karnataka
- Bahraich Seventh-day Adventist Senior Secondary School, Bahraich, Uttar Pradesh
- Bangalore (HAL) Seventh-day Adventist Higher Secondary School, Bangalore, Karnataka
- Bangalore Seventh-day Adventist Higher Secondary School, Bangalore, Karnataka
- Bhalki Seventh-day Adventist High School, Bidar, Karnataka
- Bidar Seventh-day Adventist High School, Bidar, Karnataka
- Bobbili Seventh-day Adventist Higher Secondary School, Bobbili, Andhra Pradesh
- Brooke Side Adventist Higher Secondary School, Shillong, Meghalaya
- Busy Bee Seventh-day Adventist High School, Goa
- Calicut Seventh-day Adventist School, Kozhikode, Kerala
- Chengalpet Seventh-day Adventist Higher Secondary School, Chengalpet, Tamil Nadu
- Chennai Seventh-day Adventist Higher Secondary School, Chennai, Tamil Nadu
- Chickmagalur Seventh-day Adventist High School, Chickmagalur, Karnataka
- Dharmapuri Seventh-day Adventist Matric. Hr. Sec. School, Collectorate, Dharmapuri, Tamil Nadu
- Dindigul Seventh-day Adventist Higher Secondary School, Dindigul, Tamil Nadu
- E D Thomas Memorial Higher Secondary School, Thanjavur District, Tamil Nadu
- Ernakulam Seventh-day Adventist Higher Secondary School, Kochi, Kerala
- Erode Seventh-day Adventist High School, Erode, Tamil Nadu
- Flaiz Memorial Higher Secondary School of Seventh-day Adventists, West Godavari District, Andhra Pradesh
- Hapur Seventh-day Adventist Senior Secondary School, Hapur, Uttar Pradesh
- Hatkanangale Seventh-day Adventist Secondary School, Kolhapur, Maharashtra
- Helen Lowry Higher Secondary School, Aizawl, Mizoram
- Hosur Seventh-day Adventist Higher Secondary School, Hosur, Tamil Nadu
- Hubli Seventh-day Adventist High School, Hubli, Karnataka
- Hyderabad Seventh-day Adventist Higher Secondary School, Hyderabad, Andhra Pradesh
- Ibrahimpatnam Seventh-day Adventist Higher Secondary School, Krishna District, Andhra Pradesh
- Indore Seventh-day Adventist Higher Secondary School, Indore, Madhya Pradesh
- Iritty Seventh-day Adventist Secondary School, Iritty, Kerala
- Jalahalli Seventh-day Adventist Higher Secondary School, Bangalore, Karnataka
- Jalandhar Seventh-day Adventist Senior Secondary School, Jalandhar, Punjab
- James Memorial Higher Secondary School, V.O.C. District, Tamil Nadu
- Kadugondanahalli Seventh-day Adventist High School, Bangalore, Karnataka
- Kaduthuruthy Seventh-day Adventist School, Kottayam, Kerala
- Kariavattom Seventh-day Adventist Secondary School, Thiruvananthapuram, Kerala
- Kattachal Seventh-day Adventist School, Kollam, Kerala
- KGF Seventh-day Adventist High School, KGF, Karnataka
- Khunti Seventh-day Adventist Senior Secondary School, Ranchi, Jharkhand
- Khurda Seventh-day Adventist Higher Secondary School, Khurda District, Orissa
- Kochadai Seventh-day Adventist High School, Madurai, Tamil Nadu
- Kodambakkam Seventh-day Adventist High School, Chennai, Tamil Nadu
- Kolar Seventh-day Adventist High School, Kolara, Karnataka
- Kolhapur Seventh-day Adventist Higher Secondary School, Kolhapur, Maharashtra
- Kolkata Seventh-day Adventist High School, Kolkata, West Bengal
- Kollam Seventh-day Adventist School, Kollam, Kerala
- Kollegal Seventh-day Adventist High School, Kollegal, Karnataka
- Kottarakara Seventh-day Adventist Higher Secondary School, Kottarakara, Kerala
- Kovilpatti Seventh-day Adventist Higher Secondary School, Kovilpatti, Tamil Nadu
- Kowdiar Seventh-day Adventist School, Thiruvananthapuram, Kerala
- Kozhencherry Seventh-day Adventist School, Kozhencherry, Kerala
- Krishnagiri Seventh-day Adventist School, Krishnagiri, Tamil Nadu
- Kulathupuzha Seventh-day Adventist School, Kollam, Kerala
- Kuttapuzha Seventh-day Adventist Higher Secondary School, Thiruvalla, Kerala
- Lakkavaram Seventh-day Adventist High School, E. G. District, Andhra Pradesh
- Lasalgaon Seventh-day Adventist Higher Secondary School, Nasik District, Maharashtra
- Lowry Memorial Higher Secondary School, Bangalore, Karnataka
- Lucknow Seventh-day Adventist Senior Secondary School, Lucknow, Uttar Pradesh
- M. C. Dhamanwala English Higher Secondary School of Seventh-day Adventists, Surat, Gujarat
- Machilipatnam Seventh-day Adventist High School, Krishna District, Andhra Pradesh
- Madurai Central Seventh-day Adventist Matriculation Higher Secondary School, Madurai, Tamil Nadu
- Madurai East Seventh-day Adventist Higher Secondary School, Madurai, Tamil Nadu
- Madurai North Seventh-day Adventist Higher Secondary School, Madurai, Tamil Nadu
- Madurai South Seventh-day Adventist Higher Secondary School, Madurai, Tamil Nadu
- Manamadurai Seventh-day Adventist Higher Secondary School, Manamadurai, Tamil Nadu
- Maninagar Seventh-day Adventist Higher Secondary School, Ahmedabad, Gujarat
- Mavelikara Seventh-day Adventist Higher Secondary School, Mavelikara, Kerala
- METAS of Seventh Day Adventist School,Surat , Gujarat
- Mysore Seventh-day Adventist High School, Mysore, Karnataka
- Nagercoil E D Willmott Memorial Seventh-day Adventist Higher Secondary School, Nagercoil Kanniyakumari, Tamil Nadu
- Navsari Seventh-day Adventist Higher Secondary School, Navsari, Gujarat
- Nedumkandam Seventh-day Adventist Secondary School, Idukki, Kerala
- Nettithozhu Seventh-day Adventist School, Idukki, Kerala
- Neyveli Seventh-day Adventist Higher Secondary School, Neyveli, Tamil Nadu
- Seventh day Adventist school Lasalgaon, Nashik, Maharastra
- Seventh day Adventist school Vyara, Surat, Gujarat
- Nilambur Seventh-day Adventist School, Nilambur, Kerala
- Nuzvid Seventh-day Adventist Higher Secondary School, Krishna District, Andhra Pradesh
- Ottapalam Seventh-day Adventist Higher Secondary School, Ottapalam, Kerala
- Palakkad Seventh-day Adventist Higher Secondary School, Palakkad, Kerala
- Panruti Seventh-day Adventist Higher Secondary School, Panruti, Tamil Nadu
- Pathanamthitta Seventh-day Adventist Higher Secondary School, Pathanamthitta, Kerala
- Periyakulam Seventh-day Adventist Higher Secondary School, Periyakulam, Tamil Nadu
- Pondicherry Seventh-day Adventist Higher Secondary School, Pondicherry, Puducherry
- Pulieranghy Seventh-day Adventist Higher Secondary School, Pulieranghy, Tamil Nadu
- Raymond Memorial Higher Secondary School, Jalpaiguri District, West Bengal
- Rohru Seventh-day Adventist High School, Shimla, Himachal Pradesh
- Rajapalayam Seventh-day Adventist School, Rajapalayam, Tamil Nadu
- Sankarankoil Seventh-day Adventist Higher Secondary School, Sankarankoil, Tamil Nadu
- Santhampara Seventh-day Adventist School, Idukki, Kerala
- SDA Residential English High School, Nedumkandam, Kerala
- Secunderabad Seventh-day Adventist High School, Secunderabad, Andhra Pradesh
- Seventh-day Adventist Higher Secondary School, Gandhi Nagar, Puducherry
- Seventh-day Adventist Higher Secondary School, Sadar, Nagpur, Maharashtra
- Seventh-day Adventist Higher Secondary School, Sanpada, Navi Mumbai, Maharashtra
- Seventh-day Adventist Higher Secondary School, Shanmugapuram, Puducherry
- Seventh-day Adventist Higher Secondary School, Trichy
- Seventh-day Adventist Inter College, "The Retreat", Roorkee, UK
- Seventh-Day Adventist Matriculation High School, Marthandam (Viricode), Tamil Nadu
- Seventh-day Adventist Senior Secondary School, Vidhan Sabha Marj, Lucknow, UP
- Sivakasi Seventh-day Adventist High School, Sivakasi, Tamil Nadu
- Spicer Memorial College Higher Secondary School, Pune, Maharashtra
- Sulthan Battery Seventh-day Adventist School, Sultan Battery, Kerala
- Sunshine Home and High School of Seventh-day Adventists, Bangalore, Karnataka
- Tambaram Seventh-day Adventist High School, Chennai, Tamil Nadu
- Thachampara Seventh-day Adventist School, Palakkad, Kerala
- Thanjavur Seventh-day Adventist Higher Secondary School, Thanjavur, Tamil Nadu
- Thiruchengode Seventh-day Adventist Higher Secondary School, Thiruchengode, Tamil Nadu
- Thirumala Seventh-day Adventist Secondary School, Thiruvananthapuram, Kerala
- Thiruvilwamala Seventh-day Adventist Higher Secondary School, Thrissur, Kerala
- Thrissur Seventh-day Adventist Higher Secondary School, Thrissur, Kerala
- Tonia Seventh-day Adventist School, Tonia, Jharkhand
- Tuticorin Seventh-day Adventist High School, Tuticorin, Tamil Nadu
- Usilampatti Seventh-day Adventist High School, Usilampatti, Tamil Nadu
- Vadavathoor Seventh-day Adventist Secondary School, Kottayam, Kerala
- Valavanur Seventh-day Adventist Higher Secondary School, Viluppuram, Tamil Nadu
- Vallakadavu Seventh-day Adventist School, Thiruvananthapuram, Kerala
- Vattapara Seventh-day Adventist School, Thiruvananthapuram, Kerala
- Vijayawada Seventh-day Adventist High School, Vijayawada, Andhra Pradesh
- Virudhunagar Tambakarnar Memorial Seventh-day Adventist Higher Secondary School, Virudhunagar, Tamil Nadu
- Visakhapatnam Seventh-day Adventist High School, MVP Colony, Visakhapatnam, Andhra Pradesh
- Visakhapatnam Seventh-day Adventist High School, Visakhapatnam, Andhra Pradesh

== Inter-European Division ==
=== Austria ===
- Seminar Schloss Bogenhofen, Bogenhofen

=== France ===
- Maurice-Tièche Comprehensive School, Collonges-sous-Salève

=== Germany ===
- Schulzentrum Marienhöhe, Darmstadt

=== Portugal ===
- Funchal Primary School, Madeira
- Oficina de Talentos, Primary school, Lisbon
- Oliveira do Douro K-9 School, Vila Nova Gaia
- Primary School, Setúbal

=== Romania ===
- Maranatha Adventist High School, Cluj-Napoca, judetul Cluj
- Onisim Adventist High School, Craiova, jud. Dolj
- Stefan Demetrescu Adventist High School, Bucharest

=== Spain ===
- Educativo Adventista de Sagunto, Sagunto, Valencia
- Rigel School, Zaragoza
- Timón School, Madrid
- Urgell School, Barcelona

=== Switzerland ===
- Adventist Private School, Zürich

== Trans-European Division ==
=== Croatia ===
- Srednja škola u Maruševcu s pravom javnosti, Maruševec

=== Denmark ===
- Vejlefjordskolen, Daugaard, Denmark

=== Finland ===
- Finland Junior College, Piikkio, Finland

=== Norway ===
- Engesvea Barne og Ungdomsskole, Lillehammer
- Nidelven Skole, Trondheim
- Tyrifjord Videregående Skole, Røyse
- Østmarka Skole, Oslo

=== Serbia ===
- Gimnazija Živorad Janković, Novi Sad

=== Sweden ===
- Ekebyholmsskolan, Rimbo, Sweden

=== United Kingdom ===
- Harper Bell Seventh Day Adventist School, Camp Hill, Birmingham, England
- The John Loughborough School, Tottenham, London, England (closed 2013)
- Stanborough School, Watford, Hertfordshire, England

== Euro-Asia Division ==
=== Russia ===
- Zaoksky Adventist School, Zaoksky
- ZaokSKY Adventist University, Zaoksky

== See also ==
- List of Seventh-day Adventist colleges and universities
- List of Seventh-day Adventist hospitals

== Sources ==
- Adventist Yearbook
- Adventist Academy links
- Adventist K-12 schools
- Adventist directory
- Seventh Day Adventist Church South Pacific Division Administration Directory, 2006
- Southeast Asia Union Mission Primary/Secondary Schools
