= EPAA =

EPAA may refer to: Executive Personal Assistant Association

- East Pasco Adventist Academy, Dade City, Florida
- École de pilotage de l'Armée de l'air
- Education Policy Analysis Archives
- Emergency Petroleum Allocation Act of 1973
- Environmental Planning and Assessment Act 1979
- European Partnership for Alternative Approaches to Animal Testing
- European Phased Adaptive Approach
