= Puget Sound Adventist Academy =

Coordinates: 47°39′24″N 122°11′45″W

Location
- 5320 108th ave NE; Kirkland, Washington; USA

Information
- Type: 9-12
- Motto: "I can do all things through Christ who strengthens me" Philippians 4:13
- Religious affiliation: Adventist
- Denomination: Seventh-Day Adventist
- Established: 1997
- Enrollment: 68 (as of 2024)
- Colors: Blue, White, and Gold
- Athletics: Men's Soccer, Men's(Club) and Women's Volleyball, Men's and Women's Basketball, Men's and Women's Tennis, Track, Golf
- Athletics conference: Sea-Tac League 1B/2B WIAA
- Mascot: Sharks
- Website: psaa.org

Puget Sound Adventist Academy is a Seventh-day Adventist high school that shares a campus with Kirkland Adventist School in Kirkland, Washington, United States. It is a part of the Seventh-day Adventist education system, the world's second largest Christian school system. Its extra-curricular activities focus on outreach and community service, but also include music instruction and performance, and athletic programs.

== See also ==
- List of Seventh-day Adventist secondary schools
- Seventh-day Adventist education
