= Bermuda Institute =

Location
- 234 Middle Road; Southampton; SN 04; Bermuda; 32°15′N 64°51′W

Information
- School type: Private
- Denomination: Seventh-day Adventist
- Established: 1943
- School number: SN BX
- Principal: Linda Holdipp
- Faculty: 10
- Gender: Co-educational
- Age range: 5-18+
- Colours: Maroon, Gold, and Green
- Accreditation: Adventist Accrediting Association
- Newspaper: The Observer (discontinued)
- Yearbook: The Ponciana
- Alumni: Terrance Dean, Owen Simons, Judy Lowe-Teart, Dwayne and Wayne Caines

Bermuda Institute is a PreK-12 co-educational, Christian school located in Southampton, Bermuda. It is owned and operated by the Seventh-day Adventist Church.

It is a part of the Seventh-day Adventist education system, the world's second largest Christian school system.

== History ==
In September 1943, 17 pupils ranging from grades one to four began their education in one classroom in the basement of the building then known as the Bay View Apartments.

In 1953 the school was transferred to its campus and its 129 pupils relocated in a remodeled two-storey building, on the purchased Sandringham property. As the available classroom space proved inadequate, other classrooms had to be added which included the new modern elementary building which was opened in 1961.

Careful planning of the upgrading of the school's status to a Junior Academy was given by the Mission and at the Biennial Session of 1965, it was voted that a new wing be erected. The additional building has allowed for the program of the school to be expanded to include high school levels.

As a result, Bermuda Institute, by action of the Mission Biennial Session held May 1967, it has been a K-12 school. As of 2019 Bermuda Institute has opened up a Preschool. It is open and accepting new students from ages 3–4.

== See also ==
- List of Seventh-day Adventist secondary and elementary schools
- Seventh-day Adventist education
- Seventh-day Adventist Church
- Seventh-day Adventist theology
- History of the Seventh-day Adventist Church
