= Harbert Hills Academy =

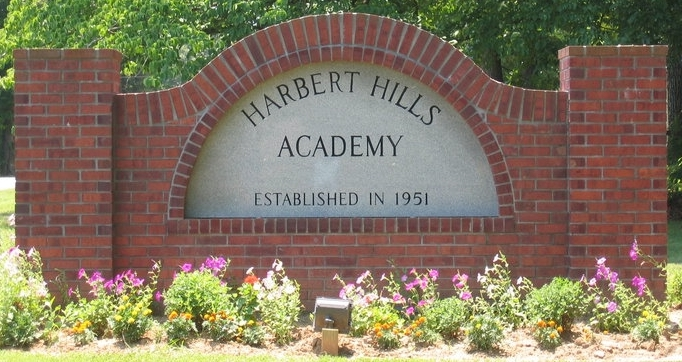

Location
- 3575 Lonesome Pine Road; Savannah, Tennessee 38372; United States; 35.2107°N 88.0645°W

Information
- School type: Private Donations, Private, Co-educational, Boarding, Day, & Christian
- Religious affiliation: Seventh-day Adventist Church
- Established: 1951
- Founder: William E. Patterson, a retired FBI Agent
- President: Stephen L. Dickman
- Principal: Angel White
- Grades: 9-12
- Gender: Co-educational

Harbert Hills Academy is an independent, self-supporting, co-educational, private day and boarding school. It is owned and operated by Rural Life Foundation, chartered as a non-profit 501(c)(3) corporation in August 1951. The 500-acre (202 ha) campus is located Savannah, Tennessee. Harbert Hills Academy has connections to the Seventh-day Adventist Church, but is not part of the denominational Seventh-day Adventist education system.

== History ==
A secondary educational institution, Harbert Hills Academy was founded by William E. Patterson, a retired FBI Agent who attended Fletcher Academy, then later decided he would start a similar school. Agent Patterson spoke with local Judge Harbert, who he had worked with while prosecuting moonshine cases. Judge Harbert donated over 500 acres to build the Harbert Hills Academy campus. The late President Emeritus L.L. Dickman and other Dickman family members have taken an enhanced interest in the Academy over the years and they have served in leadership capacities for decades.

== Curriculum ==
Harbert Hills Academy’s curriculum consists primarily of the standard courses taught at college preparatory schools across the world. All students are required to take classes in the core areas of English, Basic Sciences, Mathematics, a Foreign Language, and Social Sciences. It is accredited by the E. A. Sutherland Education Association, which was developed by The Layman Foundation to assist independently operated and self-supporting schools that exist outside the Seventh-day Adventist denominational education system.

== See also ==
- List of Seventh-day Adventist secondary schools
- Seventh-day Adventist education
