= Midland Adventist Academy =

Location
- 6915 Maurer Road; Shawnee, Kansas; United States; 39°0′9.42″N 94°46′11.06″W

Information
- Type: Private Coeducational
- Religious affiliation: Seventh-day Adventist Church
- Established: April 20, 1961
- Principal: Gregory Murphy
- Faculty: ~ 15
- Enrollment: ~ 130
- Campus: 40 acres (.16 km²) Suburban
- Colors: Red; Black
- Mascot: mustang
- Website: midlandacademy.org

Midland Adventist Academy is a private, coeducational, K-12 grade school located in Shawnee, Kansas. It is a part of the Seventh-day Adventist education system, the world's second largest Christian school system.

== Academics ==
Midland is part of the greater Adventist education system operated by the Seventh-day Adventist Church. It is under the direction of the Office of Education of the North American Division of Seventh-day Adventists, which began oversight of elementary and secondary education in 1872.

== See also ==
- List of Seventh-day Adventist secondary schools
