= San Diego Academy =

Coordinates: 32.6873°N 117.0780°W

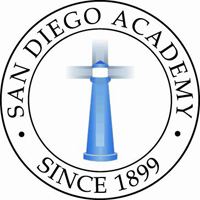

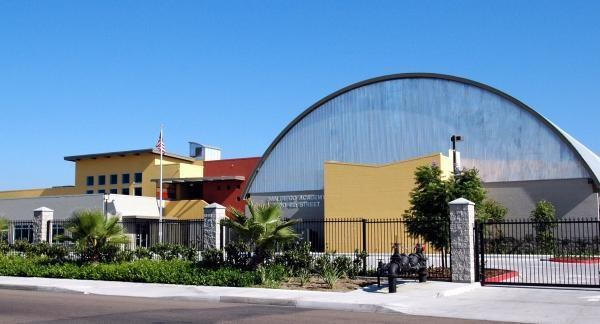
- National City, California; United States

Information
- Type: Private Christian
- Established: 1899
- Principal: Stephanie Mayang
- Color
- Athletics: Men's and Women's Varsity and Junior Varsity
- Mascot: Cavaliers
- Website: sdacademy.com

San Diego Academy is a private coeducational K-12 Christian school in National City, California. It is part of the Seventh-day Adventist educational system, the world's second largest Christian school system.

== See also ==
- List of Seventh-day Adventist secondary schools
- Seventh-day Adventist education
