= Sandy Lake Academy =

School in Bedford, Nova Scotia, Canada

Location
- 435 Hammonds Plains Road; Bedford, Nova Scotia, B4B 1Y2; Canada; 44.7283792°N 63.6956065°W

Information
- School type: Independent day Jr.P-12 school
- Motto: "Service Above Self"
- Religious affiliation: Seventh-day Adventist Church
- Founded: 1927
- Principal: Steve Kibbee
- Grades: Jr. Primary to Grade 12
- Enrollment: 180 (2026)
- Language: English
- Area: Halifax, Nova Scotia and The Maritimes
- Colours: Blue, Gold and White
- Website: sandylakeacademy.ca

Sandy Lake Academy (SLA) is a private Christian Jr.P-12 day school in Bedford, Nova Scotia, affiliated with the Seventh-day Adventist Church. It is owned and operated by the Maritime Conference of Seventh-day Adventists and is the only Canadian Seventh-day Adventist high school east of Montreal. The school operated a dormitory for boarding students from 1988 but today enrols day students only. As a part of the Seventh-day Adventist school system, it is a part of the second-largest Christian school system in the world.

== History ==
Sandy Lake Academy initially began in 1927 as a one-teacher elementary school with ten students operating out of the basement of the Halifax Seventh-day Adventist church. In 1962, growing student enrollment led to the school expanding to a two teacher operation offering up to grade 10. By 1968 the school once again needed to expand, adding a third classroom. This growth eventually caused the school to outgrow the church basement, and plans were made to move the school to its own property. In 1971, a property was purchased partway between Halifax and Dartmouth in Bedford, Nova Scotia so that the school could serve both cities; and in 1974, the new school building was complete and classes began that fall. As the property was on the shore of Sandy Lake, the school was renamed Sandy Lake Academy.

Initially, the new school offered grades 1-10, taught by four teachers, with an enrollment of 90. The original school building contained a gymnasium and five classrooms, in preparation for future expansion. School was offered four days a week at first in order to accommodate the increased distance students had to travel to get to the new school; some students chose to find a boarding room near the school. In 1981, the school expanded to offer grade 12; around the same time, a science lab, home economics room, and an industrial arts facility were added to the building to support the high school expansion. That same year, an Adventist church was established at Bedford to support the staff and students of the school. In 1988 a dormitory was built, which allowed SLA to accept boarding students from across the Maritimes, as well as internationally. This change led Sandy Lake Academy to become a conference school, supported by the Maritime Conference of Seventh-day Adventists.

In 1996, Bedford merged with Dartmouth and Halifax to form the Halifax Regional Municipality, which brought the school back inside the borders of Halifax. Further expansions to the school created a primary program in 1997. Enrollment grew to more than 80 students in 2011–2012, when an outdoor ball field was added to the campus. In 2014 the school marked 40 years at the Bedford site and launched a junior primary program for four-year-olds.

== Academics ==
Sandy Lake Academy is a full Jr.P-12 academy, accredited by the North American Division of Seventh-day Adventists and the Province of Nova Scotia. SLA uses the curriculum provided by the Nova Scotia Department of Education, and also follows the curriculum guides from the North American Division of Seventh-day Adventists. The high school diploma issued by Sandy Lake Academy is based on academic coursework done by the student between grades 10-12.

The school employs about a dozen teachers. Courses offered include mathematics, English, science, social studies, Bible, French, physical education, music, family studies, computer and skilled trades. All students in grades 7–12 take part in the school choir and orchestra, and students may also join junior and senior handbell choirs; senior students travel each spring to the Northern New England Music Clinic in Freeport, Maine. In keeping with the motto "Service Above Self", students are expected to complete ten or more hours of community service each term.

== See also ==
- Seventh-day Adventist Church
- Seventh-day Adventist education
- List of Seventh-day Adventist secondary and elementary schools
