= Hong Kong Sam Yuk Secondary School =

School in Happy Valley, Hong Kong

Location
- 17-A Ventris Road; Happy Valley; Hong Kong; 22°16′19″N 114°11′07″E

Information
- School type: Private, Day school
- Denomination: Seventh-day Adventist
- Established: 1948
- Closed: 1 September 2008
- School district: Wan Chai District
- Chairperson: Wing Kin Cheng
- Dean: Yau Keung Ma
- Principal: Caleb Chi Hing Chung
- Chaplain: Kuo Hsang Liu; Assistant: Man Kit Dai
- Faculty: 30
- Gender: Co-educational
- Education system: Hong Kong Examinations and Assessment Authority
- Campus type: Urban
- Accreditation: Adventist Accrediting Association
- Website: www.hksy.edu.hk

Hong Kong Sam Yuk Secondary School was a co-educational Christian secondary school, located in Happy Valley, Hong Kong. The school was owned and operated by the Seventh-day Adventist Church.

On 1 September 2008, the school formally closed its operation.

== History ==
The school was established in 1948 as "Pioneer Church Elementary School" aimed at providing primary education to the church of that time. When it first opened, the total enrolment of the school numbered at 9, all of whom where children of church leaders. In 1949, in response to an urgent need for primary education, the school in September of that year changed its name to "Sam Yuk Primary School".

In 1952, student enrolment jumped to 300. With the increase came a demand for secondary education and in June 1953, the school upgraded to become a junior secondary school, governed by "Seventh-day Adventists District Council of Hong Kong and Macao." In the same year, the Hong Kong Education Department formally registered the institution. The school's name was again changed to "Sam Yuk Middle School, Happy Valley Branch" and expansion was completed in 1954.

In 1963, to celebrate the school's 15th anniversary, the name was officially changed to "Hong Kong Sam Yuk Secondary School" and the school became a government-funded private school. At that time, school enrolment was at a record high of over 1000, forcing the school to set up an Aberdeen Campus.

During the 1970s, the school faced difficulties as the Hong Kong government implemented its policy of free education. Many new schools were built which led to increased competition. This was followed by a decline in school enrolment figures and as a result, the Aberdeen campus was merged back into the main Happy Valley campus.

In the 1980s after many discussions with the Education Department, an agreement was made that allowed the school access to government funding, resulting in many school-wide improvements.

The 1990s, the Sino-British handover of Hong Kong led to the government's to adopt a new education policy. To be in line with these changes, the school reduced the number of classes it offered, and made improvements to the school's facilities, as well as started up in 1993 a matriculation classes.

The school formally ended its operation on 1 September 2008 at the graduation dinner, after 60 years of educating students in the Happy Valley community.

== See also ==
- List of Seventh-day Adventist secondary and elementary schools
- List of Seventh-day Adventist colleges and universities
- List of Seventh-day Adventist medical schools
- List of Seventh-day Adventist secondary schools
- Seventh-day Adventist education
- List of secondary schools in Hong Kong
