= Redlands Adventist Academy =

Location
- Redlands, California 92373; United States; 34°3′13″N 117°11′58″W

Information
- Type: Private
- Motto: Opening Hearts-Opening Minds-Opening Doors
- Religious affiliation: Seventh-day Adventist Church
- Established: 1903
- Principal: Donald Krpalek
- Grades: k - 12 Academy
- Colors: Blue, Gray and White
- Athletics: Soccer, Volleyball, Baseball, Basketball, Mountain Biking, Softball, Football, Cross Country, Swim.
- Mascot: Bulldog
- Accreditation: Adventist Accrediting Association
- Website: www.redlandsacademy.org

Redlands Adventist Academy (RAA) is a Seventh-day Adventist K-12 school accredited by the Western Association of Schools and Colleges in Redlands, California, United States.

The school is supported by the Southeastern California Conference of Seventh-day Adventists, local churches, tuition and fundraising. The school is also accredited by the Accrediting Association of Seventh-day Adventist Schools, Colleges, and Universities.

== See also ==
- List of Seventh-day Adventist secondary schools
- Seventh-day Adventist education
