= Naples Adventist Christian School =

Location
- 2629 S. Horseshoe Drive; Naples, Florida 34104; United States; 26.1621000°N 81.7749490°W

Information
- Type: Private, Coeducational
- Motto: Exceeding Expectations
- Religious affiliation: Seventh-day Adventist Church
- Established: 1970
- Principal: Loi Green
- Faculty: 5
- Grades: VPK/PK - 8th Grade
- Enrollment: 60
- Average class size: 7
- Accreditation: Middle States Association of Colleges and Schools (MSA)
- Accreditation: Adventist Accrediting Association
- Website: http://www.naplesacs.org/

Adventist school locations in Florida

Naples Adventist Christian School is a co-educational Christian PK-8th grade school located in Naples, Florida. The school was established in 1970 and is part of the international Seventh-day Adventist school system. The Naples Adventist Christian School is supported by the Naples Seventh-day Adventist church and strives to provide a spiritually-oriented education for children. The Naples Adventist Christian School operates under the direction and accreditation of the Florida Conference Department of Education in the Southern Union of the North American Seventh-day Adventist Church.

== See also ==
- List of Seventh-day Adventist secondary schools
- Seventh-day Adventist education
