= Maplewood Academy =

Coordinates: 44.8999623°N 94.3688725°W

Location
- 700 Main St N Hutchinson, Minnesota 55350; United States

Information
- Type: Private
- Religious affiliation: Seventh-day Adventist Church
- Grades: 9 - 12 Academy
- Accreditation: Adventist Accrediting Association
- Website: www.maplewoodacademy.org

Maplewood Academy is a private Christian boarding high school located in Hutchinson, Minnesota. It is owned and operated by the Minnesota Conference of Seventh-day Adventists. It is a part of the Seventh-day Adventist education system, the world's second largest Christian school system.

== See also ==
- List of Seventh-day Adventist secondary schools
- Seventh-day Adventist education
