= Mount Ellis Academy =

Location
- 3641 Bozeman Trail Rd; Bozeman, United States, Montana 59715; 45°39′10″N 110°57′16″W

Information
- School type: High school Private
- Religious affiliation: Seventh-day Adventist
- Established: 1902
- Principal: James Stuart
- Website: mtellis.org

Mount Ellis Academy is a co-educational private high school (grades 9 through 12) located about 5 miles (8.0 km) east of Bozeman, Montana, United States.

Founded in 1902, Mt. Ellis Academy includes boys and girls dormitories, an Administration building, gymnasium, and other facilities. Mt. Ellis operates a ski area on US Forest Service land about 3 miles (4.8 km) from the school in Bear Canyon. The academy sits on a 500-acre (2.0 km^{2}) campus.

During peak years in the 1960s, Mt. Ellis had nearly 200 students. In recent decades enrollment has trended downward and stood at about 70 students for the 2005- 2006 school year. According to a 2001 report, out of over 100 private schools in Montana, Mount Ellis was one of only ten accredited under state education standards.

Mt Ellis Academy is sponsored by the Seventh-day Adventist Church and is part of the Montana Conference of Seventh-day Adventists. It is a part of the Seventh-day Adventist education system, the world's second largest Christian school system.

== Kohl's Cares Win ==
In 2010, Kohl's started a Facebook contest for schools in the US to win $500,000. Mt. Ellis Academy entered this contest and came out in 10th place with 144,006 votes. After the authentication of votes process, they were in 9th place. Part of the campaign for votes was the saying, "Vote for our Sewers!" coming from the fact they planned to use the $500,000 to upgrade their 1950s era sewer system. At the Academy and in the Church, this is spoken of as a miracle.

== See also ==
- List of Seventh-day Adventist secondary schools
- Seventh-day Adventist education
