= Epauto Adventist High School =

Epauto Seventh-day Adventist Junior Secondary School
- Efate; Vanuatu

Information
- School type: Private, Co-educational, Day school
- Motto: To Nurture For Eternity
- Denomination: Seventh-day Adventist
- Established: 2004
- Area trustee: Vanuatu Seventh-day Adventist Mission
- Principal: Mrs Melanie luke
- Teaching staff: 23
- Gender: Mixed
- Classes: 6
- Language: english
- Classrooms: 12
- Colour: Blue
- Website: http://www.epauto.edu.vu

Epauto Seventh-day Adventist Junior Secondary School is a coeducational Christian secondary school in Port Vila, Vanuatu, established in 2004.

== Academics ==
Each week, the school offers for Years 8 to 10:

| Class | Number of Periods |
|---|---|
| English | 5 |
| Mathematics | 4 |
| Basic Science | 4 |
| Social Science | 4 |
| Religious Education | 5 |
| French | 3 |
| Agriculture | 3 |

For Year 11, Vanuatu Senior Secondary Certificate courses are being taught in 2008. This includes:

- English
- Mathematics
- Biology
- Geography
- Chemistry
- Physics
- Accounting
- Economics

== Student life ==
The school provides an hour of physical education for each class; and an hour work line on Wednesday afternoon and 30 minutes on Friday afternoons.

STUDENTS UPDATE:

In 2014, the total number of students at Epauto Seventh-day Adventist Junior Secondary School is 417.

== See also ==
- List of Seventh-day Adventist secondary schools

On 20 June 2014, students and teachers fundraise for their new classroom buildings by a "Walkathon" from KORMAN STADIUM to TEOUMA SHOPPING.
