= Pine Hills Adventist Academy =

Pine Hills Adventist Academy(PHAA)
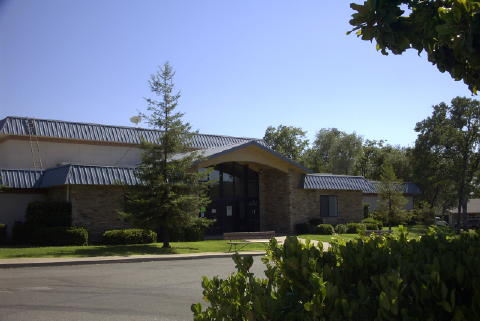

Location
- 13500 Richards Lane; Auburn, California 95603; 38.9416°N 121.0643°W

Information
- School type: Christian Private
- Founded: 1941
- Principal: David Carreon
- Grades: K-12
- Enrollment: 148
- Language: English and Spanish
- Colors: Blue and Gold
- Mascot: Eagle
- Team name: Screaming Eagles
- Affiliation: Seventh-day Adventist Church
- Website: http://phaaonline.com/

Pine Hills Adventist Academy is a private Seventh-Day Adventist K-12 Christian school founded and established in 1941 in Auburn, California. It is a part of the Seventh-day Adventist education system, the world's second largest Christian school system.

== See also ==
- List of Seventh-day Adventist secondary schools
- Seventh-day Adventist education
