= Beulah College =

Coordinates: 21°12′3.2″S 175°9′44.6″W

Location
- Vaini; Seventh Day Adventist; Tonga

Information
- School type: Private, Co-educational, Day school
- Denomination: Seventh-day Adventist
- Established: 1938
- Area trustee: Australasian Conference Association Limited
- Chairperson: Manu Latu
- Administrator: Mereseini Williams
- Principal: Linita Manuofetoa
- Chaplain: Lolohea Misinale
- Teaching staff: 17
- Gender: Mixed
- Age: 11 to 18
- Colour: maroons/white
- Accreditation: Adventist Accrediting Association
- Website: beulahcollege.adventistconnect.org

Beulah College is a coeducational Christian secondary school in Tongatapu, Tonga, established in 1938. It was formally opened by Sālote Tupou III in February 1939. The SDA Annual Statistics first report on Beulah College in 1941. It lists 109 students and five teachers for only grades 1–8. Four students graduated. The 2009 report lists 202 students, 97 of which were Seventh-day Adventists. The school provided a complete secondary school education. There were 16 graduates. In October 2015 boarders at the school were sent home after a girl in the village was diagnosed with typhoid.

== Background ==
Adventist sources variously date the school's origins at Vaini to 1922 and 1924. After the school applied for government recognition, it became officially known as Beulah College in 1937. In 1938 it had 100 students, 22 of them young women, and Peter Truscott became principal that year. Enrolment reached 289 in 1945, which the church described as the largest Adventist school in the Pacific. In 1994 former students organised the building of a hall to mark the centenary of Adventist education in Tonga, completed in 1995 at a cost of T$500,000.

The top level of the school was upgraded to Form 7 in 2015, and enrolment in 2018 was 279 students in grades seven to thirteen. Former students later raised T$245,430 for a Form 7 building, which opened during celebrations of 125 years of Adventist education in Tonga. The school is known for its brass band, and Beulah Primary School stands next to it. According to Helen Morton, Adventist schools in Tonga are funded from abroad.

== See also ==
- List of Seventh-day Adventist secondary schools
