= Chinook Winds Adventist Academy =

Independent school in Calgary, Alberta, Canada

Location
- 10101 2nd Avenue SW; Calgary, Alberta, T3B 5T2; Canada; 51.079223°N 114.233327°W

Information
- School type: Independent K–12 School
- Religious affiliation: Seventh-day Adventist Church
- Founded: 1945
- Principal: Dr. Aldo Bruccoleri
- Grades: K to 12
- Enrollment: 260
- Language: English
- Colours: Red and Black
- Team name: Cyclones
- Website: cwaa.net

Chinook Winds Adventist Academy is an Independent K–12 Christian school located in Calgary, Alberta, Canada, that is affiliated with the Seventh-day Adventist Church.

== History ==
Chinook Winds Adventist Academy was originally established in 1945 as Calgary Seventh-day Adventist School in the basement of a Calgary Seventh-day Adventist Church as an elementary school. In the early days, the school frequently moved to different locations around the city of Calgary. In 1974, the school moved to the site on which it currently stands, a twenty-acre woodlot near the Trans-Canada Highway and the Canada Olympic Park; by this point it had grown to offer K-10 education.

The first school building that was built on that site was destroyed by a fire on March 21, 1985. School was in session when the fire started, but all students and staff were evacuated safely. The school rented an empty public school in downtown Calgary for a year, while a fundraising campaign sought funds to rebuild the school. The school was rebuilt in September 1986, and upon being rebuilt the school was renamed Chinook Winds Adventist Academy. The school was named after the Chinook winds that are common to the area. By this point in time the school had 115 students. Shortly after moving into the rebuilt school, Chinook Winds expanded to offer a full K-12 education. That second school building is the one still used by CWAA today.

== Academics ==
CWAA is a full K-12 academy, recognized as a Category 1 Private School by the Alberta Ministry of Education. The school is also accredited by the Accrediting Association of Seventh-day Adventist Schools, Colleges, and Universities. The school follows curriculum guidelines set out by the Alberta Ministry of Education and the North American Division of Seventh-day Adventists. Upon completion of Grade 12, students receive the Alberta High School Diploma.

CWAA employs 18 teachers, and 29 faculty and staff in total, for a teacher to student ratio of 11.3:1. Courses offered include social studies, language arts, math, biology, chemistry, physics, physical education, religious studies, and music, as well as numerous electives.

== Extracurriculars ==
The CWAA Cyclones compete in the Calgary Independent School Athletic Association and in the Canadian Adventist School Athletics association. The Cyclones compete in boys and girls volleyball, softball, soccer, basketball, floor hockey, badminton, track and field, and co-ed flag football. Their athletic director is Rick Fowler.

CWAA has a music program which includes music classes offered from K-12. At the high school level, CWAA has a choir and a band, both of which go on yearly tours, and regularly compete in the Kiwanis Music Festival. Their music program is directed by Karenda Swain.

CWAA offers a mission trip to high school students every other year. The most recent mission trip went to Belize, in Spring 2024.

== Notable alumni ==
- Jennifer Sidey, astronaut

== See also ==
- Seventh-day Adventist Church
- Seventh-day Adventist education
- List of Seventh-day Adventist secondary and elementary schools
