= Okanagan Christian School =

Christian private school in Kelowna, British Columbia

Coordinates: 49.87650°N 119.39738°W

Location
- 1035 Hollywood Road South; Kelowna, British Columbia, V1X 4N3; Canada

Information
- Type: Co-educational, Private
- Motto: Shaping Character and Discovering Purpose
- Denomination: Seventh-day Adventist
- Established: 1917
- Principal: Jordan Wirtz
- Grades: Preschool-12
- Colours: Red, Black, White
- Team name: OCS Eagles
- Accreditation: Province of BC, Ministry of Education
- Website: http://www.ocskelowna.com/

Okanagan Christian School (OCS) is a private school located in Kelowna, British Columbia with students enrolled in grades Preschool-12. The school takes part in and also sometimes hosts the annual Canadian Adventist School Athletics or CASA for short. Sports played include Volleyball and Flag Football, both are played at the junior (grades 10 down) and senior (Grades 12 down) levels.

A student association body manages events like Christmas Banquets, high school lock-in, Spirit week and other small events with both high school and elementary involvement.

In 2004, the school underwent major reconstruction, which saw a new front entrance and a rebuilt roof in some areas.

An affiliated daycare started in 2014, The Treasure Box Daycare offers Christian based services for preschool-aged children in the city of Kelowna.

OCS celebrated its Centennial in 2017.

In the spring of 2017, the constituent members voted to change the name of the school to Okanagan Christian School from Okanagan Adventist Academy.

Okanagan Christian School is affiliated with the Seventh-day Adventist Church BC Conference which owns and oversees operations in conjunction with the locally elected board of directors.

== Curriculum ==
The school's curriculum consists primarily of the standard courses taught at college preparatory schools across the world. All students are required to take classes in the core areas of English, Basic Sciences, Mathematics, a Foreign Language, and Social Sciences.

== Spiritual aspects ==
All students take religion classes each year that they are enrolled. These classes cover topics in biblical history and Christian and denominational doctrines. Instructors in other disciplines also begin each class period with prayer or a short devotional thought, many of which encourage student input. Weekly, the entire student body gathers together in the auditorium for an hour-long chapel service.

Outside the classrooms, there is year-round spiritually-oriented programming that relies on student involvement.

== See also ==
- List of Seventh-day Adventist secondary schools
- Seventh-day Adventist education
