= Burton Adventist Academy =

Location
- 4611 Kelly Elliott Road; Arlington, Tarrant, Texas 76017; United States; 32.6709°N 97.1739°W

Information
- Former names: Fort Worth Adventist Junior Academy
- Type: Private school
- Motto: Leading students to Christ, preparing them for life
- Religious affiliation: Seventh-day Adventist Church
- Founder: Mr. & Mrs. Harry F. Burton
- Oversight: Seventh-day Adventist education
- NCES School ID: 01635302
- Principal: Ellen Thomas
- Teaching staff: 25.1 (on an FTE basis)
- Grades: PreK-12
- Gender: Co-educational
- Enrollment: 318 (2015-2016)
- Student to teacher ratio: 12.7
- Language: English
- Campus type: Suburban
- Colors: Royal Blue, Yellow, White
- Athletics conference: TCAF
- Mascot: Blue Angels
- Nickname: BAA
- Website: burtonacademy.org

Burton Adventist Academy is a co-educational private Christian school in Arlington, Texas, United States. It covers the grades from pre-kindergarten through twelfth grade. Burton is associated with the Seventh-day Adventist Church and is part of the Seventh-day Adventist education system. It offers a basic high school diploma, advanced diploma, and honors diploma.

== Spiritual aspects ==
All students take religion classes each year that they are enrolled.

== See also ==
- List of Seventh-day Adventist secondary schools
- Seventh-day Adventist education
