= Mamawi Atosketan Native School =

Location
- 441022 Range Rd 253; Ponoka, Alberta, T4J 1R2; Canada; 52.7258987°N 113.6382782°W

Information
- School type: Independent K–12 School
- Religious affiliation: Seventh-day Adventist Church
- Founded: 1984
- Principal: Michael Willing
- Faculty: 19
- Grades: K to 12
- Enrollment: 200
- Language: English
- Colours: White; Orange and Red
- Website: www.mamawiatosketan.ca

Mamawi Atosketan Native School (MANS) is an independent Christian school located just north of Ponoka, Alberta, Canada, that is affiliated with the Seventh-day Adventist Church. The school primarily serves Cree students near Maskwacis, and it offers a special native studies program to its students. The school is the only native school in Canada that is operated by the Seventh-day Adventist church.

== History ==
Mamawi began thanks to the efforts of an Adventist pastor who was conducting outreach to the Native people living around Hobbema, Alberta, named Basil Van Diemen. After many years, he was granted permission to open a native school at the Hobbema church, for the 1984-85 school year. Due to its unique status as a private Christian school operating on a native reservation, it could not receive funding or government grants through ordinary means, but after further efforts, funding was secured from Ottawa through the Indian Act. The school was named the Samson Adventist Private School, as it served the Samson band that was living on the Hobbema reservation. That first year, Sandra Kiehlbauch was hired as the teacher/principal of the school, which met in a room at the back of the Maskwachees Seventh-day Adventist church. She taught 20 students that first year; 100 students applied.

In the years immediately following, other Adventist schools were opened in the immediate vicinity: a school to serve the Montana band was opened in 1985, and another native school was opened at Pigeon Lake, 20 miles west, in 1990. These schools operated wherever space could be found, be it an empty building or a series of portables that were shipped in. In 1992, the schools lost access to the facilities they had been using, so the decision was made to combine all of the schools into one larger regional school to serve all of the native bands in the area. This new school was named Mamawi Atosketan Native School. The school was initially located just south of the reservation, in a former public school property that was in poor condition, and offered K-9 education. As the school was now off-reservation, the school was funded entirely by tuition grants from the native bands and by offerings collected by the Seventh-day Adventist church.

In 2003, the school moved to a new building specially constructed for the school. In 2012, the school received permission to expand and offer high school, making the school a full K-12 academy. One new grade was added per year, so its first grade 12 class graduated in 2015. That same summer, Mamawi began construction on a new high school building that would house grades 8-12 on its campus, leaving the old building as the elementary building. This new school building, when completed, will expand capacity at Mamawi to up to 280 students.

== Academics ==
Mamawi Atosketan is a full K-12 academy, operated by the Alberta Conference of Seventh-day Adventists. It is accredited by the North American Division of Seventh-day Adventists, and it is recognized as an accredited, non-funded private school by the province of Alberta.

Mamawi Atosketan teaches the curriculum used by the province of Alberta. In addition, Mamawi teaches religious curriculum, as well as native studies courses to all grades.

== Transportation ==
Mamawi operates its own school buses.

== Extracurriculars ==
Mamawi competes in tournaments hosted by the Fellowship of Christian Athletes, and in tournaments hosted by Burman University. Mamawi competes in volleyball and basketball.

Total Praise is the school's sign-language choir.

== See also ==
- Seventh-day Adventist Church
- Seventh-day Adventist education
- List of Seventh-day Adventist secondary and elementary schools
