= Escondido Adventist Academy =

Coordinates: 33°8′24″N 117°6′26″W

- Escondido, California; United States

Information
- Type: Private K–12, College Preparatory
- Motto: Educating the Head, the Hand, and the Heart
- Principal: Darena Shetler
- Faculty: 19
- Enrollment: Varies
- Athletics: Men's and Women's Varsity Flag Football, Volleyball, Basketball, Softball, and Golf Middle School (6th-8th) Men's and Women's Flag Football, Basketball, Volleyball, and Soccer.
- Mascot: Hawk
- Website: www.eaaschool.org

Escondido Adventist Academy (EAA) is a private, Seventh-day Adventist-governed Christian school in Escondido, California, serving students in grades K-12. It is operated by a school board which represents the 14 Seventh-day Adventist churches in San Diego North County. It is a part of the Seventh-day Adventist education system, the world's second largest Christian school system. Escondido Adventist Academy is a part of the Southeastern California Conference of the SDA School System.

== See also ==
- List of Seventh-day Adventist secondary schools
- Seventh-day Adventist education
