= El Dorado Adventist School =

Seventh-day Adventist school

Location
- 1900 Broadway; Placerville, California 95667; United States; 38°43′47″N 120°47′55″W

Information
- Type: Private, coeducational elementary through eighth grade
- Motto: Go. Change the world
- Religious affiliation: Seventh-day Adventist Church
- Principal: Lupe Negrete
- Faculty: 18
- Grades: K-8
- Campus size: 10 acres (4.0 ha)
- Colors: Navy Blue & Silver
- Sports: Boys' and girls' basketball, flag football, volleyball, soccer

El Dorado Adventist School is a non-profit, WASC accredited, coeducational K-8 school owned and operated by local church constituencies and the Northern California Conference of Seventh-day Adventists. It is a part of the Seventh-day Adventist education system, the world's second largest Christian school system. It is in the Sierra foothill community of Placerville, California, United States.

== See also ==
- List of Seventh-day Adventist secondary schools
- Seventh-day Adventist education
