= Fountainview Academy =

Location
- 7615 Lytton-Lillooet Highway; Lillooet, British Columbia, V0K 1V0; Canada; 50.5333°N 121.7666°W

Information
- School type: Private high school
- Motto: Building Character
- Religious affiliation: Seventh-day Adventist
- Established: 1975
- President: Scott Richards
- Principal: Baird Corrigan
- Faculty: 9
- Grades: 10-12
- Enrollment: 60
- Language: English
- Campus: Rural
- Accreditation: Province of BC, Ministry of Education
- Diploma awarded: Provincial "Dogwood" diploma
- Website: www.fountainview.ca

Fountainview Academy is parochial boarding secondary school 27 km (17 mi) south of Lillooet, British Columbia, Canada. It enrolls approximately 60 students in grades 10–12, primarily from Canada and the United States, but students also come from other countries, such as Korea, Germany, Iceland, and Papua New Guinea. It has a youth orchestra and choir and all students participate in one or both of them. The school is closely affiliated with, but not owned or operated by, the Seventh-day Adventist Church.

== Philosophy of education ==
The book Education by Ellen G. White provides the principles which guide the Academy. "Fountainview Academy strives to achieve its mission through a balanced program of vocational training and study. Each student is required to attend approximately 25 hours of classes and 18–20 hours of career and technical training each week as a means of translating theory into practice in the individual’s life."

== Work experience and service activities ==
The high school includes an organic carrot farm which in 2008 was the largest producer of organic carrots in the province of British Columbia. The Adventist Church historically strongly advocated that students gain vocational training experience as part of their education. The carrot farm provides the students with such practical work experience. Students also meet their weekly career and technical training requirement by being assigned to various departments in campus development and upkeep, digital media, janitorial, cafeteria, or the office.

== Conversion therapy allegations ==
In 2018, a previous student posted allegations on Medium that Fountainview Academy had engaged in the discredited practice of conversion therapy on LGBTQ+ students. In 2021 another student came forward with similar conversion therapy allegations.

== See also ==
- List of Seventh-day Adventist secondary schools

== Sources ==
- Fountainview Academy Student Handbook 2009-2010
