= Highland View Academy =

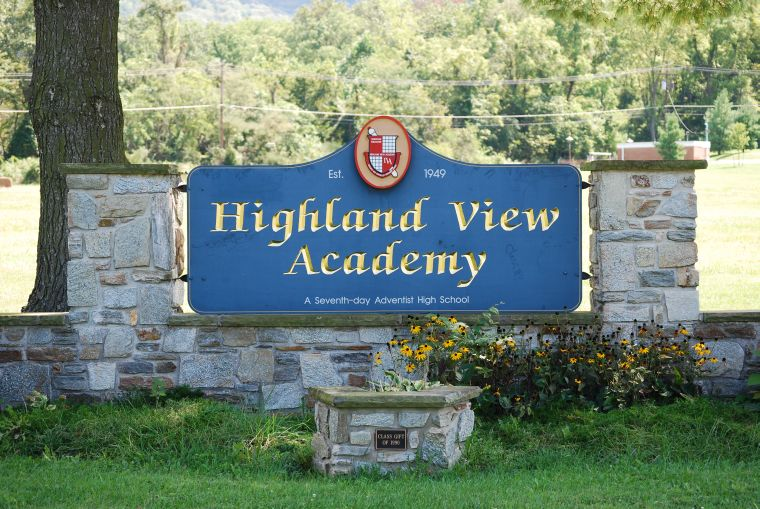

Location
- 10100 Academy Drive; Hagerstown, Maryland 21740; United States; 39.592876°N 77.615268°W

Information
- School type: Private, parochial, day/boarding
- Motto: Educating for Eternity
- Denomination: Seventh-day Adventist Church
- Established: 1949
- CEEB code: 210605
- Principal: Rob Gettys
- Teaching staff: 11 (FTE) (as of 2017-18)
- Grades: 9-12
- Gender: Coed
- Enrollment: 90 (as of 2017-18)
- Student to teacher ratio: 8.9 (as of 2017-18)
- Athletics conference: Delaney Athletic Conference
- Team name: Tartans
- Newspaper: The Post (Now defunct)
- Yearbook: The Highlander
- Website: http://www.hva-edu.com/

Highland View Academy is a private, religious co-educational secondary boarding school located in Hagerstown, Maryland, United States. The school is run by the Seventh-day Adventist Church. It is a part of the Seventh-day Adventist education system, the world's second largest Christian school system. It is accredited by the Middle States Association of Colleges and Schools

== History ==
Mount Aetna Academy was established in 1949 as a day school. It offered education for grades 1-12. That first year there were 50 students enrolled in Grades 1-8 and 30 students enrolled in Grades 9-12. It was located at the present Mount Aetna Adventist Elementary School on Crystal Falls Drive.

At a May, 1965, constituency meeting, the Chesapeake Conference of Seventh-day Adventists voted to build a fully accredited secondary boarding school. On October 9, 1966, ground was broken for the first two buildings, Janel Kay DeHaan Hall and Hartle Hall. The Dehaan and Hartle families participated in this event. The boarding phase of the school opened in the fall of 1967 with one hundred students enrolled. Two new dormitories had been constructed. The school continued to use the facilities of the former Mount Aetna Academy while the new campus was being completed. In 1975, the administration building, was opened. Four years later the gymnasium was built as a separate building.

The cafeteria-music building was added in 1986 and named E & I Barr Hall in 1993. In 1991 a library wing was added to the administration building which housed several classrooms and a computer lab. The Highland View Academy Church (Now Highland View Church) members moved into a new sanctuary on campus in 1993.

== Sports ==
Highland View Academy's athletic teams, known as the Tartans, compete in basketball, soccer, and volleyball, track and field, and gymnastics. In addition, there is a co-educational, non-competitive sports acrobatics team, the HVA Aerials. The HVA Aerials focus is promoting a Christian lifestyle through acrobatics and gymnastics, healthy living, positive teamwork, and smart life choices.

== See also ==
- List of Seventh-day Adventist secondary schools
- Seventh-day Adventist education
