= Greater Miami Adventist Academy =

Location
- 500 Northwest 122nd Avenue; Miami, Florida 33182; United States; 25°53′08″N 80°13′26″W

Information
- Type: Private, Coeducational high school, elementary school, middle school, preschool
- Religious affiliation: Seventh-day Adventist Church
- Established: 1912; 114 years ago
- Principal: Lorna Leon
- Teaching staff: 24.6 (FTE) (2015–16)
- Grades: PK–12
- Enrollment: 448 (PK–12) (2015–16); 415 (K–12) (2015–16)
- Student to teacher ratio: 16.9∶1 (2015–16)
- Campus size: 10 acres (4.0 ha)
- Colors: Navy, Gold, White
- Sports: Boys and Girls Basketball, Volleyball, Soccer, Boys Flag Football, Girls Softball
- Nickname: GMAA
- Website: Official website

Greater Miami Adventist Academy location in Florida

Greater Miami Adventist Academy is a private Christian highschool in Miami, Florida. It is owned and operated by the Florida Conference of Seventh-day Adventists. It is accredited by the Accrediting Association of Seventh-day Adventist Schools, Colleges and Universities, which is a member of the National Council for Private School Accreditation. It also is accredited by Florida Association of Academic Non-Public Schools, Middle States Association of Colleges and Schools and Board of Regents of the General Conference of Seventh-day Adventists. Founded in 1912, it has experienced steady growth in attendance and is a part of the Seventh-day Adventist education system, the world's second largest Christian school system.

== History ==
GMAA had its beginning in 1912, when it was known as Greater Miami Elementary School. Classes were held in a tent behind the Miami Temple Church in Downtown Miami on the corner of NW 8th Street and Miami Avenue. After the church buildings were built, two school rooms were constructed to house the growing number of students. The school grew, and in 1922 was moved to a suitable building which housed a three-room school, covering eight grades at 333 NW 30th Street. It moved to another downtown site when the church building was sold in 1925 and went to the newly constructed church and school building at 862 SW 4th Street. Junior Miami Academy moved from the downtown site to 3200 NW 18th Street in 1952. There only a few buildings ready when the classes begin in 1952. It was in 1960 that it became Greater Miami Academy and for 1961 it had its first graduates as a four-year academy with grades 1 through 12. GMAA presently occupies a two-story facility at 500 NW 122nd Avenue in Tamiami and was renamed Greater Miami Adventist Academy.

Today most GMA students come from the state of Florida, but many come from other areas, namely from the South and there are also international students, from nations of Latin America. As for 2019 school-year, GMAA had over 380 students.

== Athletics ==
The academy offers the following FHSAA sanctioned varsity competitive sports:

- Basketball (boys & girls)
- Cross Country (boys & girls)
- Flag Football (boys)
- Soccer (boys & girls)
- Softball (girls)
- Tennis (boys & girls)
- Volleyball (boys & girls)

In addition, the school sponsors an exhibition gymnastics team called The Acroamericas, which performs at college and professional sporting events and gives drug and alcohol awareness performances at other schools.

== See also ==
- List of Seventh-day Adventist secondary schools
- Seventh-day Adventist education
