= Greaves Adventist Academy =

Location
- 2330 West Hill Ave; Montreal, Quebec, H4B 2S4; Canada; 45.4639165°N 73.6231538°W

Information
- School type: Independent K–11 School
- Religious affiliation: Seventh-day Adventist Church
- Founded: 1899
- Grades: K to 11
- Enrollment: 200
- Language: English
- Colours: Blue and Yellow
- Website: www.greavesadventistacademy.com//

Greaves Adventist Academy is an Independent K–11 Christian school located in Montreal, Quebec, Canada, that is affiliated with the Seventh-day Adventist Church.

== History ==
Greaves Adventist Academy traces its history back to the Montreal English Seventh-day Adventist Church School, which was founded in January 1899. Over the next few decades, an English-language school and a French-language school were both operated by the Seventh-day Adventist Church in Montreal. In the 1952, the English-language school was renamed the Montreal Seventh-day Adventist School, and the school was located at the Westmount Seventh-day Adventist Church. Enrollment was low at this time, with only nine students in attendance in 1963.

The school frequently moved during this era, occupying nine different sites before settling on its current campus, in the Notre-Dame-de-Grâce neighbourhood of Montreal. In 1979, the school was renamed The Adventist School of Montreal (West). By this time the school's fortunes had begun to turn, and enrollment reached 73. The school also added a high school program at this time. In 1994, the school was named Greaves Adventist Academy, in honour of Sylvia Greaves, who joined the school in 1963 as its only teacher, and at the time of her retirement in 1985 was its principal.

In 2008, Greaves expanded by adding a satellite school at a second campus: Greaves Adventist Academy - Sartigan Campus. This second school offers grades K-7 education in both English and French. The parent school became known as Greaves Adventist Academy - Montreal Campus. By 2013, enrollment at the Montreal Campus had reached 277 students.

== Academics ==
Greaves is a full K-11 academy. In Quebec it is considered a private non-subsidized school, which allows it to teach in the English language without an eligibility certificate.

The school is accredited by the Quebec Ministry of Education, and the school follows the curriculum requirements that the Ministry has established. High school students at Greaves take the provincial exams that have been created by the Ministry of Education upon completion of their courses. Greaves is also accredited by the North American Division of Seventh-day Adventists. Greaves teaches religion courses using the Encounter Bible Curriculum, which has been adopted by the North American Division of the Seventh-day Adventist Church.

=== Sartigan Academy ===
Greaves Adventist Academy - Sartigan Campus is located in St-Georges de Beauce, Quebec. Sartigan Academy is a fully bilingual school, which is also accredited by both the Quebec Ministry of Education and the North American Division of Seventh-day Adventists. Sartigan offers K-8 education as of 2022.

== See also ==
- Seventh-day Adventist Church
- Seventh-day Adventist education
- List of Seventh-day Adventist secondary and elementary schools
