= Lake View Academy =

Location
- 8712 Don Carlos; Bukidnon; Philippines; 7°40′11″N 125°00′15″E

Information
- School type: Private
- Denomination: Seventh-day Adventist
- Established: June 1967
- Principal: Lowell U. Rojas
- Faculty: 8
- Gender: Co-educational
- Accreditation: Adventist Accrediting Association

Lake View Academy (LVA) is a complete secondary boarding school operated by the Seventh-day Adventist Church. It is situated in the midst of the rural area Don Carlos in Bukidnon, Philippines. It had an enrolment of 250 students during the year between 2007–2008. It is part of the Seventh-day Adventist Church's worldwide educational system.

== History ==
Lake View Academy is a boarding school operated by the Northern Mindanao Conference of Seventh-day Adventists to fill the need of its constituents for Adventist education in the secondary level. It was established in 1967 by the Northern Mindanao Mission to serve the whole of its constituents, and named Lake View Academy. It opened in June 1967 with seven (7) teachers including the principal, Pastor Serafin F. Fadre. It catered to one hundred forty one (141) initial batches of students in the first and second year alone. The first graduation was in 1971.

Situated in the one (1) hectare lot along the national highway of Don Carlos, Bukidnon, which was acquired through the efforts and negotiations made by the Mission Committee headed by Pastor Teofilo Layon, Northern Mindanao Mission president, and chairman of the Academy Board.

During the pioneering stage, the students were accommodated in temporary shacks while the construction of the dormitories was done. Besides the contracted carpenters, students were employed in the construction and also in developing the school farm which also helped finance their schooling. Being the younger of the two academies, (the other is Mindanao Mission Academy) which are operated by the Northern Mindanao Conference, the needs were enormous. The Union assisted financially in the surveying, processing of the documents and notarial fees of the school property, leaving the Northern Mindanao Conference to fill up the other needs such as the installation of water pump and generator, costs for the dormitories, trays, forks and spoons for the cafeteria, typewriters, adding machines, and a mimeographing machine.

== Spiritual aspects ==
All students take religion classes each year that they are enrolled. These classes cover topics in biblical history and Christian and denominational doctrines. Instructors in other disciplines also begin each class period with prayer or a short devotional thought, many which encourage student input. Weekly, the entire student body gathers together for an hour-long chapel service. Outside the classrooms there is year-round spiritually oriented programming that relies on student involvement.

== Athletics ==
The school offers the following sports:

- Football (boys & girls)

== See also ==
- List of Seventh-day Adventist secondary schools
