= Highland Academy =

Location
- 211 Highland Circle Dr. Portland, TN 37148; United States; 36.52183°N 86.49697°W

Information
- Status: Open
- CEEB code: 431892
- Principal: Chadd Watkins
- Grades: 9-12
- Enrollment: 100
- Average class size: 21
- Language: English
- Campus: Rural
- Campus size: 300 acres (120 ha)
- Colors: Hunter Green, White
- Athletics: Acrobatic Gymnastics, Intramurals
- Accreditation: AASASCU, NCPSA, AdvancED
- Yearbook: Chimes
- Affiliations: Seventh-day Adventist Church

Highland Academy is a Seventh-day Adventist boarding and day school located on a 300-acre (120 ha) campus near Portland, Tennessee, United States. It is owned and operated by the Kentucky-Tennessee Conference of Seventh-day Adventists. It is a part of the Seventh-day Adventist education system, the world's second largest Christian school system.

== Campus ==
A church with approximately 700 members is located next to the campus. Students and faculty join with community there for religious services. Highland Elementary School is also located nearby. Highland Elementary is operated by the Highland Seventh-day Adventist Church and offers grades Pre-K to 8.

== See also ==
- List of Seventh-day Adventist secondary schools
- Seventh-day Adventist education
