= Spencerville Adventist Academy =

Location
- Spencerville, Maryland; United States; 39°7′0″N 76°57′29″W

Information
- Type: Private, Day, College-prep
- Denomination: Seventh-day Adventist
- Established: 1943
- Principal: Robert Martinez
- Grades: K–12
- Gender: Coeducational
- Enrollment: 360
- Mascot: Buzz the Hornet
- Accreditation: AAA (NAD Office of Education); MSA
- Newspaper: The Buzz
- Yearbook: The Retrospective
- Website: https://www.spencervilleacademy.org

Spencerville Adventist Academy is a Seventh-day Adventist full K-12 day academy located in Spencerville, Montgomery County, Maryland. It is a part of the Seventh-day Adventist education system, the world's largest Christian school system. Spencerville has been ranked as the #2 school in all Maryland Its first year began in 1943 with six students and has grown to its present enrollment of over four hundred. Spencerville Adventist Academy has just opened its newly constructed facility on the outskirts of Burtonsville Maryland. They offer Pre-K through 12th grade college preparatory education. The school is open to all faiths but generally gives first right to enroll to students from Seventh-Day Adventist churches. They are also one of the first LEED certified schools in Montgomery County.

== History ==
The Spencerville Seventh-day Adventist Church was officially organized December 27, 1941. For the first decade, the church focused on the building and further upgrading of a school. In September 1943, the Spencerville church school opened for the first time with six children from three families. In mid September 1948, the church established a separate structure for the school. This building of the school delayed the building of a permanent church structure until 1951. As time went by the members realized that it had been wise to focus on the school first. Along with an increase in school enrollment the church membership also increased.

In 1995, planning began for significant development of what was then Spencerville Junior Academy. Soon after this, the school became a senior academy with an enrollment over 300 from K-12. In 2003, the church purchased property for a new facility and the groundbreaking ceremony took place April 19, 2009.

== See also ==
- List of Seventh-day Adventist secondary schools
- Seventh-day Adventist education
