= Auburn Adventist Academy =

Location
- 5000 Auburn Way South; Auburn, Washington 98092; United States; 47°16′54″N 122°09′45″W

Information
- Other name: AAA
- Former names: 1919-1930: Western Washington Missionary Academy; 1930-1971: Auburn Academy
- Type: Private boarding high school
- Motto: That Students may become of Christ convicted, to Christ committed, and for Christ compelled.
- Denomination: Seventh-day Adventist Church
- Established: 1919; 107 years ago
- Principal: Marc Nelson
- Faculty: 26
- Grades: 9–12
- Gender: Co-educational
- Enrollment: 235
- International students: 45-50
- Student to teacher ratio: 10:1
- Education system: Seventh-day Adventist
- Colors: Blue and Gold
- Mascot: Falcons
- Accreditations: Northwest Accreditation Commission; Adventist Accrediting Association; MSA-CESS; National Council for Private School Accreditation
- Newspaper: Rainier Echoes
- Yearbook: Rainier Vista
- Website: www.auburn.org

Auburn Adventist Academy (formerly Western Washington Missionary Academy and Auburn Academy) is a co-educational, Seventh-day Adventist, boarding high school in Auburn, Washington, United States that was founded in 1919. It is operated by the Washington Conference of Seventh-day Adventists and is part of the Seventh-day Adventist education system, the world's second largest Christian school system.

== History ==
The school was first founded in dense forest in 1919 under the name Western Washington Missionary Academy. From the beginning it was also known by the shorter name, Western Washington Academy and was operated by the former Western Washington Conference of Seventh-day Adventists.

In 1921, a fire destroyed the main academy building valued at $14,000. Within a year, the members of the Western Washington Conference raised the necessary funds and the school was rebuilt. It continued to grow. The surrounding timber resources were used to construct new buildings.

In 1930, the school's name was officially changed to Auburn Academy. It had been called by that name as early as 1920. In 1971, it became Auburn Adventist Academy. In 1938 a furniture factory was the major campus industry, providing employment for 80 students.

To accommodate the increase of students (approximately 300) in 1948, a new South Hall girls' dormitory was completed in 1949.

The furniture factory burned in 1942, was rebuilt, and burned again in 1951. In January, 1967, Harris Pine Mills assumed management of the factory and it continued to provide work experience to the Academy until December, 1986, when it closed.

The enrollment in 1969 had increased to 569 students making it the largest Adventist boarding school in North America.

A large auditorium, seating over 4,000, was constructed on the Academy campus in 1958 by the Washington Conference for use during the annual camp meeting. As enrollment increased the buildings on campus proved inadequate. Athletics, recreational events, and Sabbath services all took place in the same room. In 1959, the conference made the camp meeting auditorium available for use as a gymnasium. This made it possible for the school to develop an area solely for worship services.

Major construction began in 1962 with the building of Witzel Hall, the boys' dormitory, resulted in the expenditure of over a million dollars and a shift of the campus towards the south. South Hall was renamed Nelson Hall following remodeling in 1963 and the building of an adjacent chapel in 1964. Rudolph Hall, the cafeteria, was completed in 1963. Scriven Hall, the administration building, welcomed its first students in January 1965.

The Miller Aquatic Center, which includes a swimming pool with lockers, shower rooms, and physical education personnel offices adjacent to the school gymnasium, Rainier Auditorium, was opened in 1969. In 1974, students raised a substantial part of the funds for a new industrial arts complex named Spady Hall. A new music building was also completed that year.

In 1979, a new church was begun. It first opened for regular service in April 1981. Late in 1986, Harris Pine Mills of Pendleton, Oregon, since 1967 the mainstay of the Academy's student work program, closed.

On November 17, 2003 Nelson Hall burned to the ground. As a result, the boys dormitory, Witzel Hall, was divided and used as both a girls and boys residence for two years splitting the dorm in half, girls on one side, boys on the other. A new girls dorm was completed in 2005.

Since the mid-50s, enrollment has fluctuated between 300 and 550 per year. Graduating classes have grown from a low of five students in 1920 to over 100 in recent years. In recent years however enrollment has been below 300.

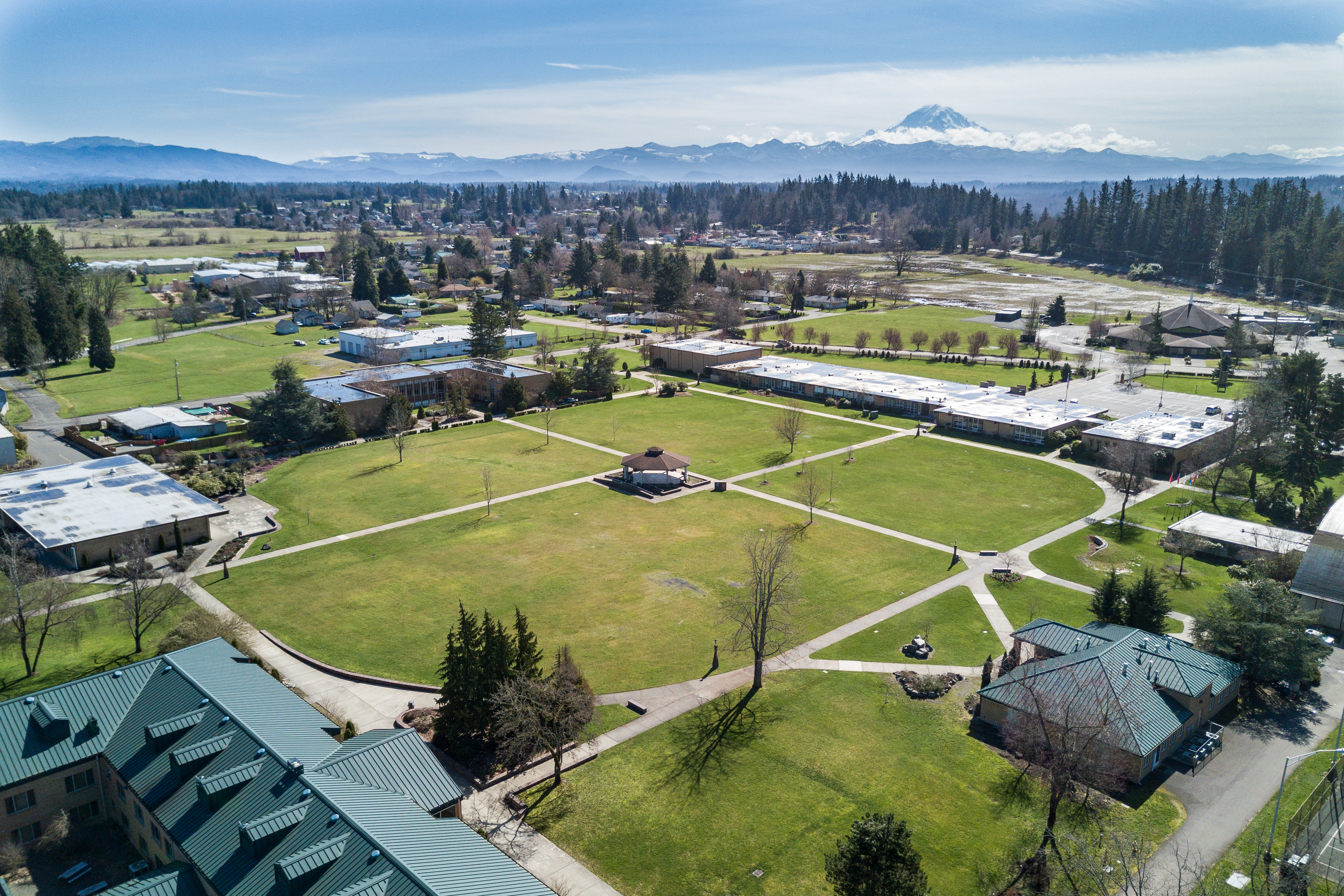
Mt. Rainier is seen in the school's southern skyline. The mountain serves as the namesake of several school publications.

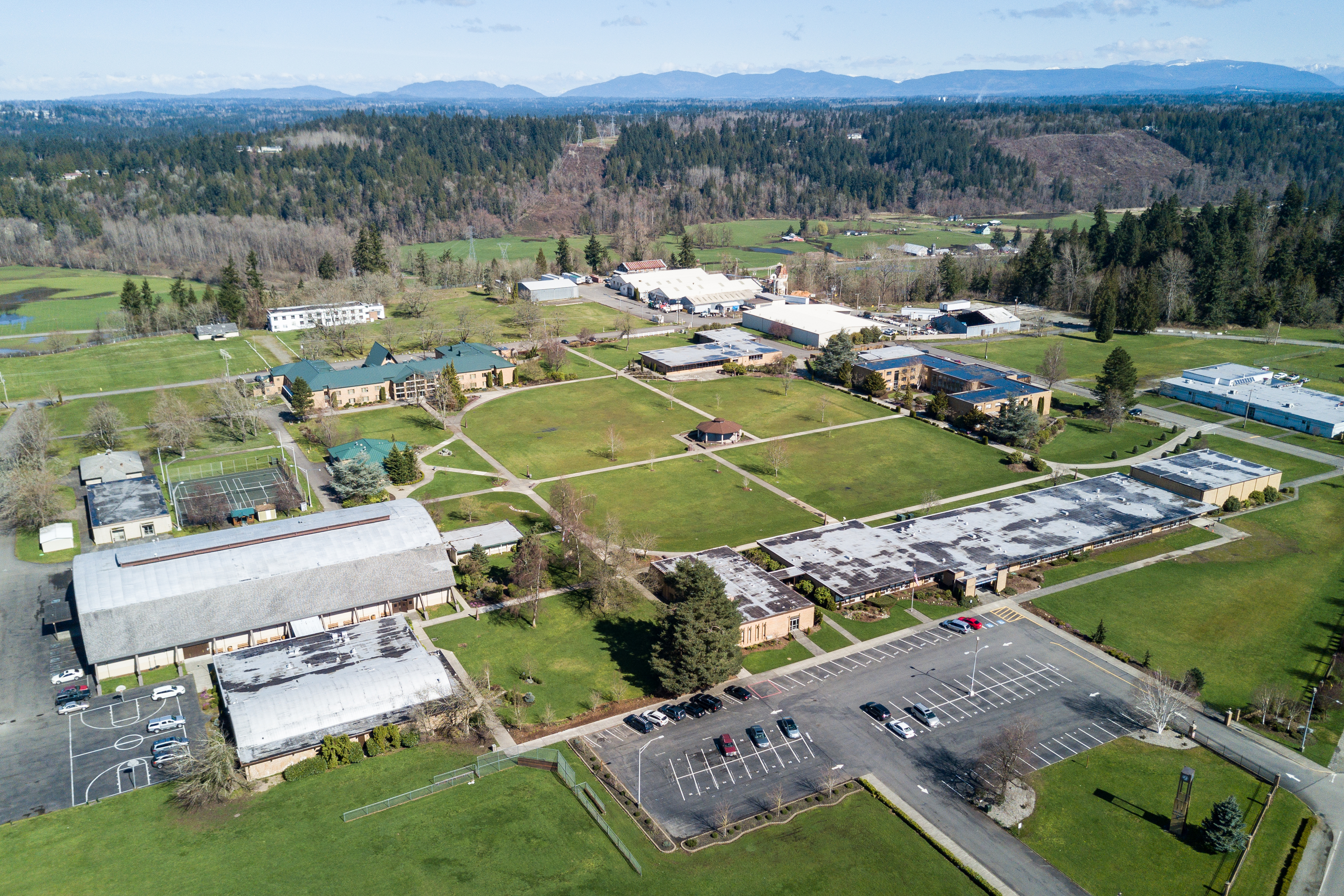
An aerial view of the school's entire campus.

== See also ==
- List of Seventh-day Adventist secondary schools
- Seventh-day Adventist education
