= Central Luzon Adventist Academy =

Christian high school in Pampanga, Philippines

Central Luzon Adventist Academy, Inc.
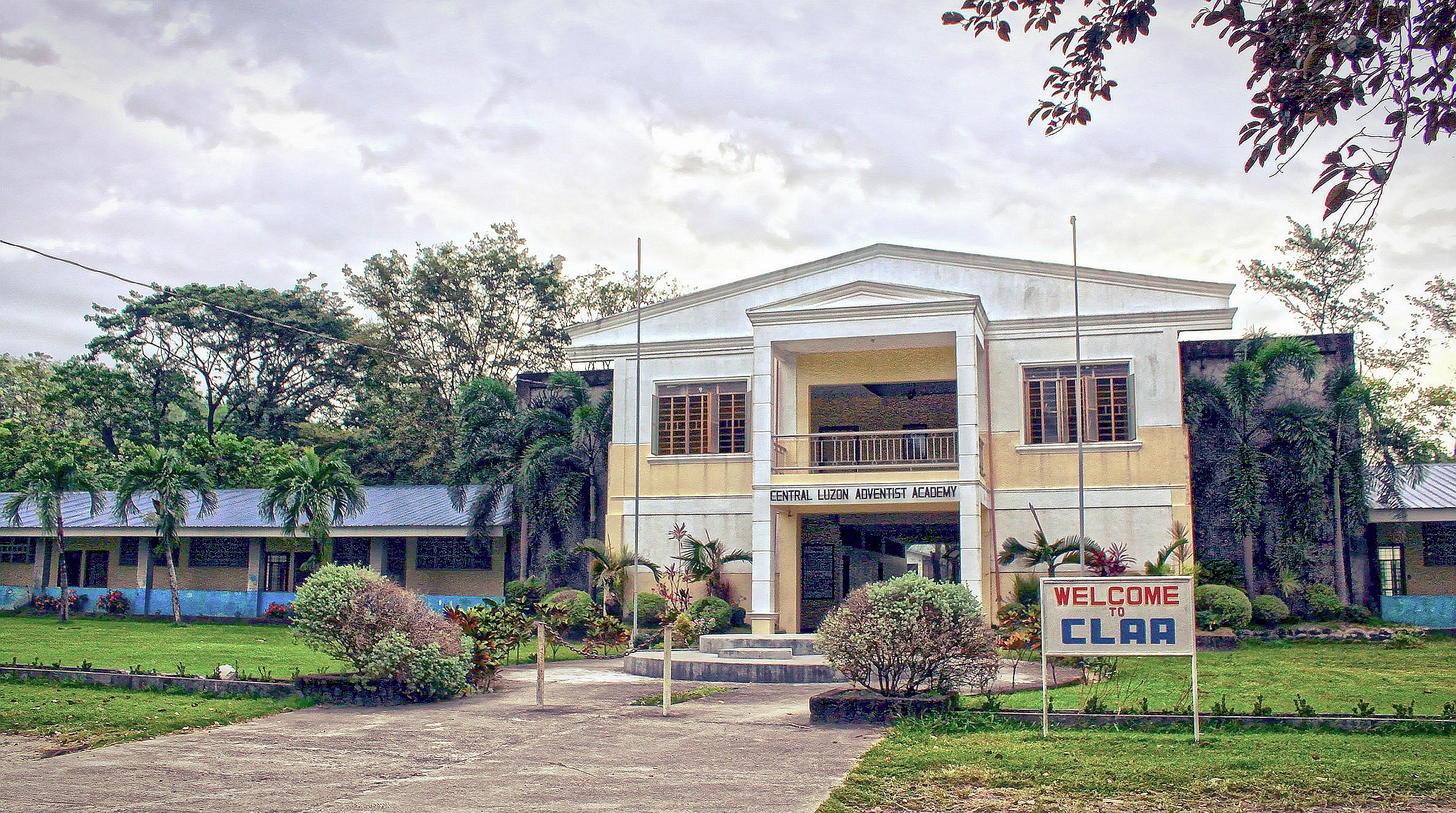

Location
- Sitio Bucaran, Brgy. Bodega, Floridablanca, Pampanga; Philippines; 14°55′21″N 120°27′21″E

Information
- Type: Private School
- Motto: Where Students are Grown Up in their Youth
- Established: 1984
- School district: Floridablanca
- Principal: ROBERT Dollente
- Enrollment: 90
- Colors: Blue, White, Yellow, Green
- Affiliation: Seventh-day Adventist

Central Luzon Adventist Academy (CLAA) is a Seventh-day Adventist secondary school located in Sitio Bucaran, Barangay Bodega, Floridablanca, Pampanga, Philippines. The school is affiliated with the Seventh-day Adventist Church and traces its beginnings from mission-oriented people who had a strong desire to develop young people for usefulness in life, and Christian service.

CLAA is part of the worldwide Adventist education system with headquarters at the General Conference of Seventh-day Adventists, Silver Spring, Maryland, USA.

It is a part of the Seventh-day Adventist education system, the world's second largest Christian school system.

== Spiritual aspects ==
All students take religion classes each year that they are enrolled. These classes cover topics in biblical history and Christian and denominational doctrines. Instructors in other disciplines also begin each class period with prayer or a short devotional thought, many which encourage student input. Weekly, the entire student body gathers together for an hour-long chapel service.

Outside the classrooms there is year-round spiritually oriented programming that relies on student involvement.

== Athletics ==
The school offer the following sports:

- Soccer (boys & girls)
- Basketball
- Badminton
- Softball
- Tennis
- Volleyball

== See also ==
- Seventh-day Adventist education
- Seventh-day Adventist Church
- Seventh-day Adventist theology
- History of the Seventh-day Adventist Church
- List of Seventh-day Adventist colleges and universities
