= Portland Adventist Academy =

Location
- 1500 SE 96th Avenue; Portland, Oregon 97216; United States; 45.512775°N 122.563831°W

Information
- Type: Private, Day, College-prep
- Motto: Christ Centered - Character Driven
- Religious affiliation: Seventh-day Adventist Church
- Established: 1910
- Principal: Mechelle Peinado
- Faculty: 20.0 (on an FTE basis)
- Grades: 9-12
- Enrollment: 261 (2017–2018)
- Colors: Blue and gold
- Athletics: Basketball, Soccer, Softball, Golf, Volleyball, Rock Climbing, and Cross-Country
- Athletics conference: OSAA Lewis and Clark, 3A
- Mascot: Cougar
- Website: http://www.paasda.org
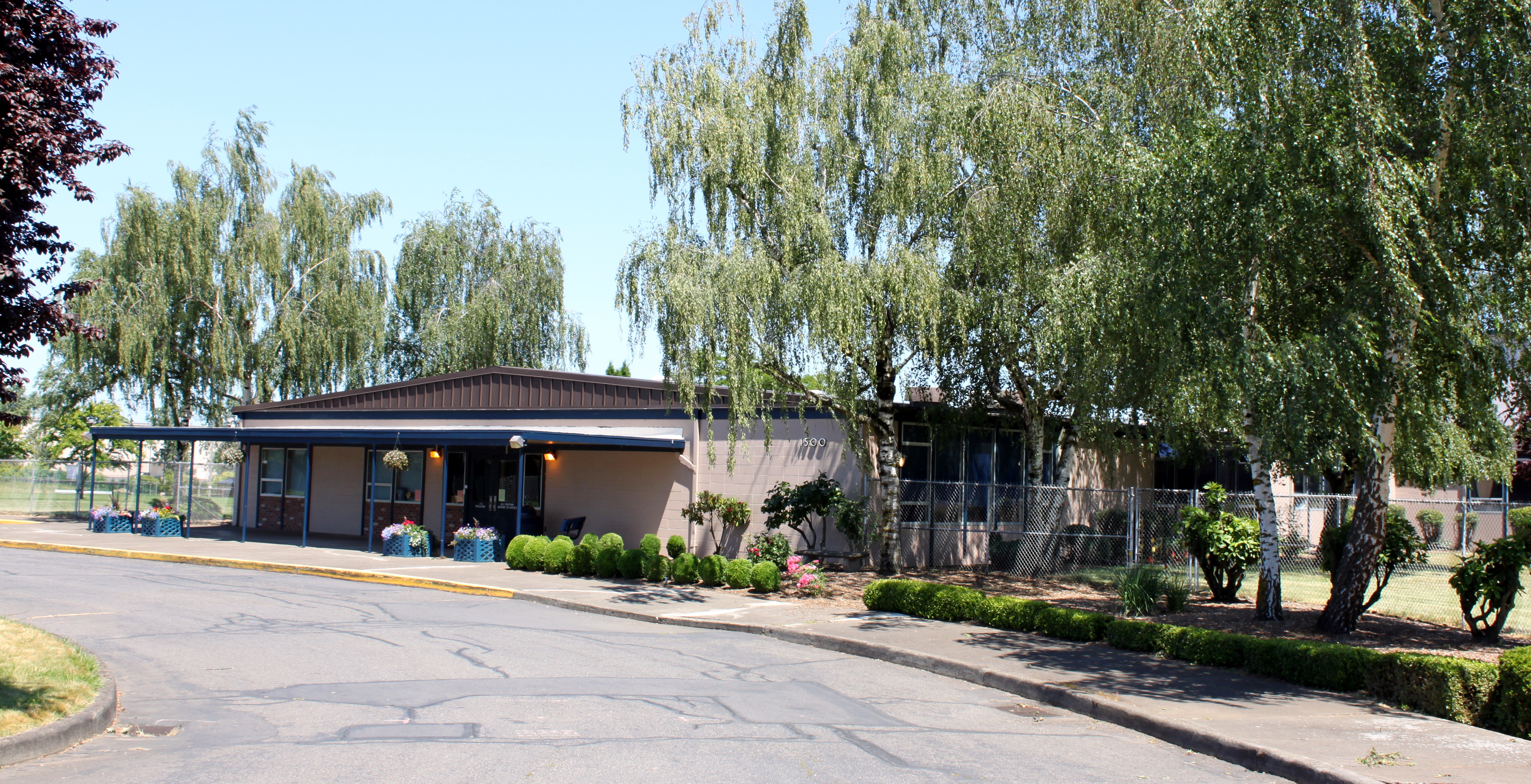

Portland Adventist Academy (PAA) is a private high school located in Portland, Oregon, United States operated by the Seventh-day Adventist Church. It is a part of the Seventh-day Adventist education system, the world's second largest Christian school system. The school was founded in 1910, and was previously known as Portland Union Academy, serving grades K-12. The name changed when the elementary section became its own school, Portland Adventist Elementary School in 1975. During the process, the high school section was renamed Portland Adventist Academy.

The main building on campus was built in 1963.

== History ==
=== Legal proceedings over sports ===
In 1996, Portland Adventist's boys basketball team qualified for the state tournament operated by the Oregon School Activities Association (OSAA). The school requested the OSAA allow the team to avoid playing a game during the Sabbath for their beliefs which runs from sundown on Friday until sundown of Saturday. The OSAA granted the request for scheduling Friday games of the tournament, but informed Portland Adventist that they could not change the schedule for Saturday games and the school would need to forfeit a Saturday game if needed. Portland Adventist won their Friday game and was able to play on Saturday after sundown and won the state championship for the 2a division. The OSAA then received complaints from other schools and refused to accommodate Portland Adventist in later tournaments.

In 2000, Portland Adventist students and parents, represented by volunteer lawyers from the Oregon affiliate of the American Civil Liberties Union (ACLU), filed a discrimination complaint against the OSAA with the Oregon State Board of Education. Oregon Superintendent of Public Instruction Stan Bunn denied the appeal for the State Board of Education in February 2002. The students and parents then asked for judicial review of the State Board of Education's decision that the OSAA did not unlawfully discriminate against Portland Adventist's religious beliefs. In June 2003, the Oregon Court of Appeals ruled in favor of the students and sent the case back to the State Board to reconsider the students' request.

The OSAA then reconsidered the request of the Portland Adventist students to not schedule games on their Sabbath. The OSAA determined the request was too much of a hardship, and the State School Board agreed, denying the Portland Adventist students' request once again. The students and their parents again sought court review, and the Oregon Court of Appeals again agreed with them in a March 2006 decision. In June 2006, the court again rejected the OSAA's arguments and found the OSAA's denial in violation of Or. Rev. Stat. § 659.850(2). On December 5, 2006, the Oregon Supreme Court took the case on an appeal from the OSAA.

During the 2007–2008 season, while the principal case was still pending in the appellate courts, the OSAA continued to refuse to allow the Portland Adventist team to enter the state tournament. A number of students and parents filed a new case in an Oregon trial court, along with a motion for temporary restraining order requiring the OSAA to allow the school to enter the tournament. A Multnomah County circuit court judge granted the motion, and the Oregon Supreme Court denied the OSAA's appeal from the temporary relief on February 15, 2008.

A decision by the Supreme Court in the principal case was announced on May 8, 2008, in which the court affirmed the Court of Appeals. It held that the OSAA had violated the statute that barred religious discrimination in school activities, and it sent the case back to the State Board of Education to review the OSAA's decision using the correct legal guidelines. The decision was written by justice Virginia Linder.

=== Reconstruction ===
An expansion of the school's campus starting in 2007 was influenced by the extension of TriMet's MAX Light Rail to Clackamas Town Center. A new station near the entrance of the school meant there was a need for a solution for tighter campus security from the heightened crime and unwanted visitor potential.

== See also ==
- List of Seventh-day Adventist secondary schools
- Seventh-day Adventist education
