= Livingstone Adventist Academy =

Location
- 5771 Fruitland Road NE; Salem, Marion County, Oregon 97301; United States; 44.941775°N 122.942419°W

Information
- Type: Private
- Established: 1898
- Principal: Todd Driver
- Grades: K-12
- Enrollment: 257
- Mascot: Lion
- Team name: Lions
- Accreditation: NWAA
- Affiliation: Seventh-day Adventist
- Website: www.livingstone.academy

Livingstone Adventist Academy is a Seventh-day Adventist school in Salem, Oregon, United States. Livingstone Adventist Academy provides a Christian educational program for students in pre-school through twelfth grade. It is one of more than forty Adventist schools directed by the Oregon Conference of Seventh-day Adventists. These schools serve over 3,000 students ranging in age from preschool children to seniors in high school. It is part of the Seventh-day Adventist Church's worldwide educational system.

== Accreditation ==
The school has been accredited by the Northwest Association of Accredited Schools since 1995.

== Academics ==
The school has classes in Language Arts, Math, Social Studies, Science, Health, Practical Arts, Physical Education, Music, and Bible classes, in the courses of study in Kindergarten through 12th Grade.

== Spiritual aspects ==
All students take religion classes each year that they are enrolled. They learn more about God. These classes cover topics in biblical history and Christian and denominational doctrines. Instructors in other disciplines also begin each class period with prayer or a short devotional thought, many which encourage student input. Weekly, the entire student body gathers together for an hour-long chapel service. Outside the classrooms there is year-round spiritually oriented programming that relies on student involvement. Monthly Community Service Days provide ongoing opportunities for all elementary and high school students to exercise their faith and experience joy in service to others.

== Athletics ==
The school offers the following sports:

- Soccer (boys & girls)
- Basketball (boys and girls)
- Volleyball (girls)
