= Pleasant Hill Adventist Academy =

Coordinates: 37.79944°N 122.18433°W

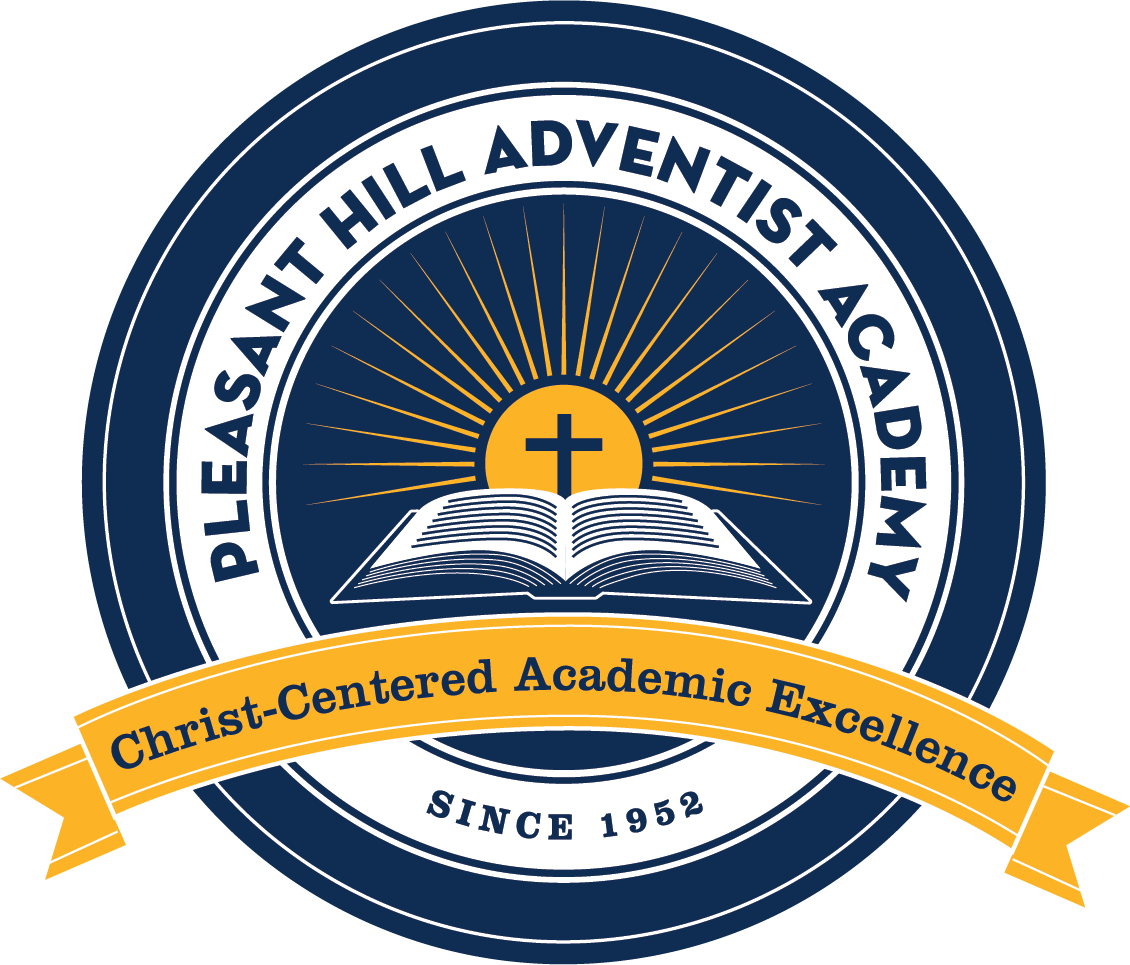
- Pleasant Hill, California; United States

Information
- Type: Private high school
- Religious affiliation: Seventh-day Adventist Church
- Principal: Rob Robinson
- Faculty: 40
- Grades: K-12
- Campus size: 10 acres (4.0 ha)
- Colors: blue, white, gold, orange
- Sports: Boys and Girls Basketball, Boys and Girls Volleyball, Boys and Girls Flag Football
- Mascot: Cougar
- Accreditation: Western Association of Schools and Colleges

Pleasant Hill Adventist Academy (PHAA) is a Seventh-day Adventist Elementary and Junior High School in Pleasant Hill, California. It is a part of the Seventh-day Adventist education system, the world's second largest Christian school system. It is an elementary, middle school, and high school, PHAA is a co-ed school, and is fully accredited with the Western Association of Schools and Colleges and the Accrediting Association of Seventh-day Adventist Schools, Colleges and Universities.

== Music ==
In addition, the school sponsors for those interested in music, Choir for all students all years of attendance, and for high school students the Chamber Singers. Handbells is available for those in high school. Orchestra is offered from third to eighth grade.

== See also ==
- List of Seventh-day Adventist secondary schools
- Seventh-day Adventist education
