= Lodi Academy =

Coordinates: 38.1189°N 121.2650°W

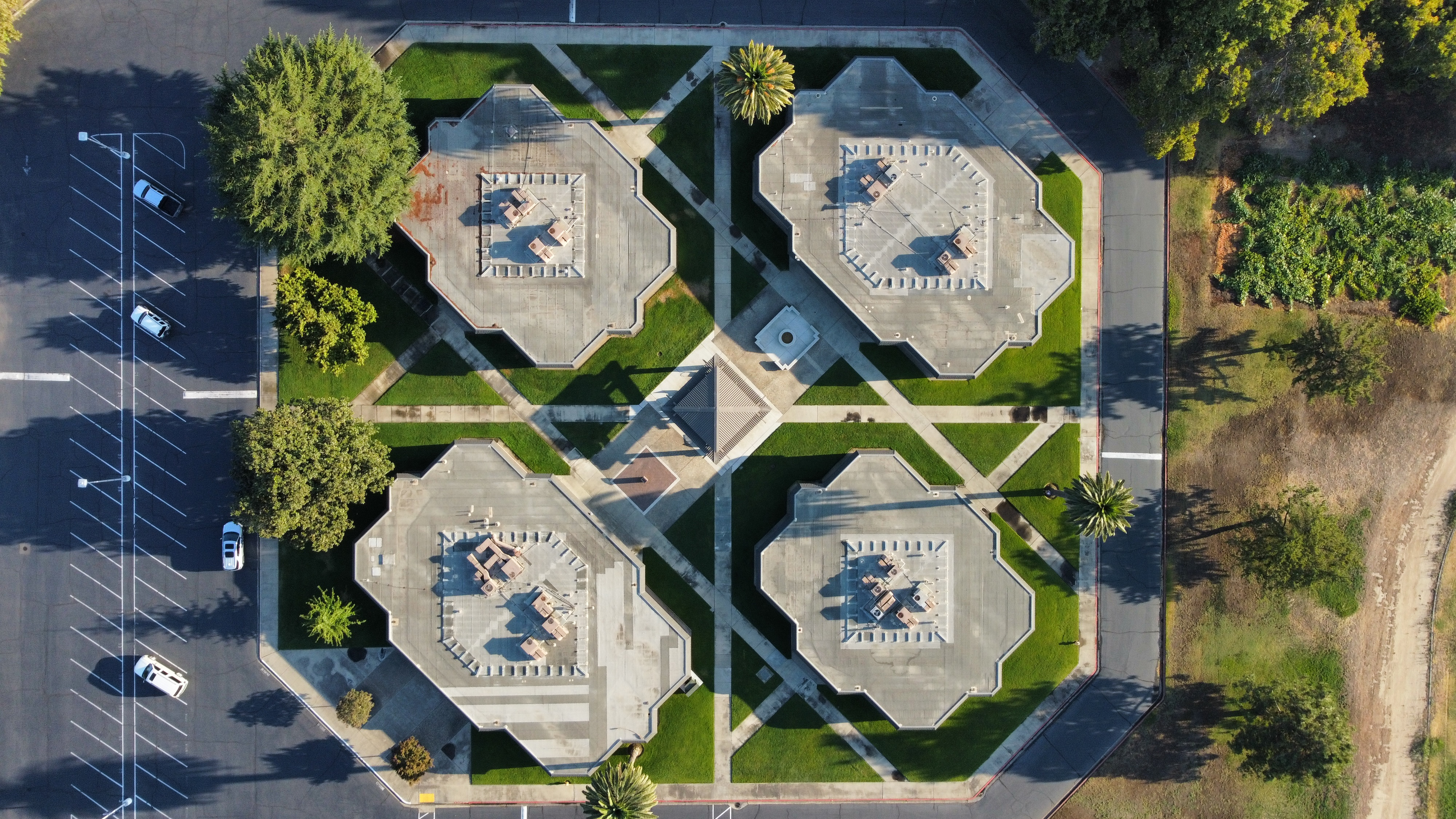
- Lodi, California; United States

Information
- Type: Private 9-12 College Preparatory
- Motto: The School That Trains For Service
- Established: 1908
- Principal: Eric Stubbert
- Faculty: 12
- Enrollment: 100
- Athletics: Men's and Women's Flag Football, Men's and Women's Volleyball, Men's and Women's Basketball, and Men's Golf
- Website: www.lodiacademy.net

Lodi Academy (LA) is a co-educational Seventh-day Adventist private school located in Lodi, California. Lodi Academy, first known as the Western Normal Institute, opened its doors as a boarding school in 1908. Professor E. D. Sharpe served as the first President. In 1968, Lodi Academy became a day school. Lodi Academy is part of the Northern California Conference of Seventh-day Adventist Church. It is a part of the Seventh-day Adventist education system, the world's second largest Christian school system.

== See also ==
- List of Seventh-day Adventist secondary schools
- Seventh-day Adventist education
