= East Pasco Adventist Academy =

Location
- Dade City, Pasco County, Florida; United States; 28.30291°N 82.18011°W

Information
- Denomination: Seventh-day Adventist Church
- Principal: Jesse Benton
- Grades: K-10
- Website: epaacademy.org

Adventist school locations in Florida

East Pasco Adventist Academy (EPAA) is a Seventh-day Adventist school for students in grades K-10. It is a part of the Seventh-day Adventist education system, the world's second-largest Christian school system. The school is located in Dade City, Florida, United States, north of Tampa.

== See also ==
- List of Seventh-day Adventist secondary schools
- Seventh-day Adventist education
