= Percy Tilson Magan =

Irish-American educator (1867–1947)

6th President of College of Medical Evangelists
- In office 1928–1942
- Preceded by: Edward H. Risley
- Succeeded by: Walter E. Macpherson

Personal details
- Born: November 13, 1867 Marlfield House, Gorey, County Wexford, Ireland
- Died: December 16, 1947 (aged 80) San Gabriel, California, United States
- Spouse(s): Ida May Bauer (m. 1892; died 1904) Lillian Eshelman (m. 1905)
- Children: 3
- Education: Battle Creek College (PhB); University of Tennessee (MD)

Religious life
- Religion: Seventh-day Adventist
- Ordination: 1899

Percy Tilson Magan (November 13, 1867 – December 16, 1947) was an Irish-American minister and educator who worked as the dean and sixth President of the College of Medical Evangelists, now called Loma Linda University.

Born in Ireland, he later immigrated to Nebraska at sixteen years old to work as a ranch hand and then at a bank. He was then converted into the Seventh-day Adventist Church during an evangelist meeting and was licensed to preach within the church.

After moving to Michigan, he spent his years educating in what is now Andrews University, and then worked as a secretary under Adventist Missionary Stephen N. Haskell and wrote the missionary reports at the Youth's Instructor. He next served as the dean of Andrews University after his friend, Edward Alexander Sutherland, was appointed President of the institution.

By 1904, he, Sutherland, and M. Bessie DeGraw, founded the Madison College in Tennessee, where he would then serve as dean of that institution. In 1915, he was called to what is now Loma Linda University to be dean and later president of that institution.

He became President Emeritus of that institution in 1942, where he later died in 1947.

== Early life and education ==
Percy Tilson Magan was born on November 13, 1867, in Marlfield House, a country house in Gorey, Ireland. His parents were Percy Magan and Anne Catherine Richards. His maternal grandfather, a Protestant named George Magan, married Ellen O'Connor, a descendant of Ruaidrí Ua Conchobair, the last High King of Ireland.

When he was nine years old, Magan was educated at the Arnold House when it was in Chester and then at St George's School in Huntingdon. In 1884, his father encountered a man named Rotchford Evans, who wanted cheap labor for his farm in Red Cloud, Nebraska. Evans paid his father $650 promised him that he would make Magan a great cattleman. So, at the age of sixteen and a half, Magan immigrated from Ireland to Nebraska, spending two years in the ranch. Following a year of abuse with the rancher, he received the permission by his father to cancel the contract and seek his own fortune somewhere in the country. Afterwards, He briefly worked at a bank by a man named Levi Moore. He was converted into the Seventh-day Adventist Church the same year through the influence of two ministers, elders L. A. Hoopes and G. E. Langdon, during their evangelist meeting in Red Cloud.

After working as a colporteur, Magan received his license to preach in 1887 and begun preaching at a country schoolhouse in Grand Island, Nebraska. Nellie Rankin Druillard, a teacher at the local Lincoln Mission School, noticed the sickly Magan and encourage him to go to Battle Creek, Michigan, and receive treatments at its sanitorium and visit its college.

For some months, Magan roomed with his friend Edward Alexander Sutherland while he worked in the college laundry and at the Battle Creek Sanitorium to pay his tuition, but that is not enough. Because of this, Ida Rankin, sister of Nellie, arranged him to draw money on a trust fund from another man.

During the Seventh-day Adventist General Conference in 1888, Magan first met Ellen G. White, where she invited the young man to live in her home in Battle Creek for some time. During his time in White's home, he developed an interest in theology when White was teaching the gospels to him. He continued living in her home for years, attending Battle Creek College (now called Andrews University) in 1893 while staying in her home.

He graduated within the college two years later with a Bachelor of Philosophy. He became a naturalized citizen of the United States in 1902. In 1914, he earned a Doctor of Medicine degree at the University of Tennessee.

== Career ==
When the General Conference Committee sent Stephen N. Haskell on an all-around tour to survey possible areas for mission stations, White suggested to Magan that he could be a good companion and secretary for Haskell. Before going with Haskell, Magan first served as a stenographer for John Orr Corliss.

Haskell first sailed to Scandinavia in February 1889, and Magan soon followed on July, first going to Dublin to visit his family and meet up with him. From 1889 to 1890, Magan served as a secretary to Haskell, travelling with him around the world to find potential mission fields, with his first survey with Haskell was to Cape Town. He also wrote reports in the Youth's Instructor during his travels with Haskell to help raise interest in missions. The first article of which was written in November 1889, where he talked about the Cape Malays.

After traveling, in 1890, he next served as an associate secretary of General Conference Foreign Mission Board until 1891. The same year, he was called to serve as to be the head of the Department of History at Union College in Nebraska, where he would meet his friend Sutherland during his summer vacation. When Sutherland offered to be the head of the Department of Bible and History at Battle Creek College, he was disappointed by the results. Wanting to turn it down, Magan reasoned with him, teaching him the ways of the Bible. By 1891, the two men became faculty of Battle Creek College. Sutherland would then be appointed President of the newly-formed Walla Walla College the next year, with Magan staying and became professor of Biblical history and literature while studying in the college. When Sutherland became President of Battle Creek College in 1897, Magan would be promoted as dean as part of Sutherland's educational reforms.

Bralliar Hall at Madison College, taken c. 1930s

In 1901, the college relocated to a 256-acre (103.6 ha) farm in Berrien Springs, Michigan, and renamed into the Emmanuel Missionary College. From there, Magan would continue to serve as dean with Sutherland as president within the institution until 1904, where he, Sutherland, and M. Bessie DeGraw, resigned during a 1904 General Conference. Later, Magan was riding with Sutherland, DeGraw, and Ellen G. White on her son, James Edson White's missionary boat, the Morningstar, at the Cumberland River near Nashville, Tennessee. During this trip, Ellen located a dilapidated farm owned by an elderly couple named the Fergusons at Madison. Magan, Sutherland, and DeGraw established a new school called Nashville Agricultural and Normal Institute, later called Madison College, in Ellen's suggested location that same year.

After graduating from the University of Tennessee to obtain an M.D., Magan helped start the Madison Sanitorium within the institute. After working with the institution, he was appointed dean at the College of Medical Evangelists, now called Loma Linda University, in 1915. Early in his career as dean, he was responsible in the development of the program into a full four-year course. He arranged that the first two years of the student's course would be carried out in Loma Linda and the later two years in the Adventist Health White Memorial Hospital in Los Angeles. It is said that under his guidance, the college was given an "A" grading by the American Medical Association in 1922. He bought on the erection of pathology, anatomy, and biochemistry laboratories in Loma Linda. He also gave a $500,000 addition to the Memorial Hospital.

He served the position as dean until 1928, when he was promoted President of the college, succeeding Edward H. Risley. He later resigned at the role of President in 1942 and became president emeritus of the college.

Magan later died in San Gabriel, California, on December 16, 1947.

== Personal life ==
Magan and Eshelman in a Christmas card

Magan was a fellow of the American College of Physicians, as well as a member of many organizations, such as the American Medical Association, Society of American Bacteriologists, American Cancer Society, National Tuberculosis Association, American Association of the History of Medicine, Los Angeles County Medical Association, League for the Conservation of Public Health, Los Angeles Surgical Society, Los Angeles Clinical Pathological Society, Hollywood Academy of Medicine, and the University Club of Los Angeles.

Politically, Magan was a Republican and his favorite recreational activity was gardening. He married twice in his life. He first married in Chicago, June 5, 1892, to Ida May Bauer, and they had two children together: Wellesley Percy and Shaen Saurin Magan. When Bauer died in 1904, Magan remarried on August 23, 1905, to Lillian Eshelman of Cherokee, Iowa, and they had one children together: Valentine O'Connor Magan.
