= List of Pi Gamma Mu members =

Pi Gamma Mu is an international collegiate honor society in the social sciences. The society was formed in 1924 at Southwestern College and the College of William & Mary.

Pi Gamma Mu's members include notable scholars, diplomats, political leaders, business leaders, and pioneering professionals. The list is not exhaustive and is simply intended to illustrate the breadth of scholarship and service of the society's members.

== Academia ==
- Henry J. Abraham – professor of government emeritus at the University of Virginia
- Vinnie B. Clark – educator and author who established the geography department at San Diego State University
- Charles A. Ellwood – professor of sociology at University of Missouri-Columbia and Duke University
- Fred Rogers Fairchild – professor of economics at Yale University
- Bruce Frier – professor emeritus of Classical Studies and Law at University of Michigan and University of Michigan Law School
- Grace Raymond Hebard – historian, suffragist, and University of Wyoming educator
- Charles P. Kindleberger – professor of International Economics at MIT
- William N. Kinnard – emeritus professor of finance and real estate at the University of Connecticut
- Margaret Mead – cultural anthropologist, curator of ethnology at the American Museum of Natural History
- Roy Franklin Nichols – professor of history at the University of Pennsylvania and 1949 Pulitzer Prize winner
- Archie Palmer – president of the University of Tennessee at Chattanooga
- Carolyn C. Perrucci – professor of sociology at Purdue University
- Serafin Quiason Jr. – director National Library of the Philippines and chairman of the National Historical Institute in the Philippines
- Judith Rodin – president of the University of Pennsylvania and president of the Rockefeller Foundation
- Edward A. Ross – sociologist and professor at Stanford University and the University of Wisconsin–Madison
- Arwin D. Smallwood – chair of the history department at North Carolina A&T State University
- Pitirim Sorokin – sociologist and professor at Saint Petersburg Imperial University and Harvard University
- Francis Sumner – chair of the psychology department at Howard University, considered the "Father of Black Psychology"
- Harrison M. Symmes – president of Windham College and United States Ambassador to Jordan
- Julio C. Teehankee – professor and chair of political science and international studies at De La Salle University
- Hutton Webster – lecturer emeritus of sociology at Stanford University
- Mary Schenck Woolman – faculty of the Teachers College and the founder of Manhattan Trade School for Girls
- Ronald Edward Zupko – professor at Marquette University

== Economics ==
- Simon Kuznets – member of the research staff of the National Bureau of Economic Research who received the 1971 Nobel Memorial Prize in Economic Sciences
- Simon Kuznets – 1971 Economics Nobel Prize winner; research staff of the National Bureau of Economic Research

== Entertainment ==
- Gaby Concepcion – Filipino television host and actress
- Margie Holmes – Filipino television host and psychologist specializing in sex therapy
- Charles Hoyes – actor

== Law ==
- Hilario Davide Jr. – Chief Justice of the Supreme Court of the Philippines and Permanent Representative of the Philippines to the United Nations
- Teresita de Castro – Chief Justice of the Supreme Court of the Philippines
- W. H. Ellis – Chief Justice of the Supreme Court of Florida, Florida Attorney General and first Florida State Auditor
- Simeon V. Marcelo – Ombudsman of the Philippines and Solicitor General of the Philippines
- Mark Martin – Chief Justice of the North Carolina Supreme Court
- Miriam Defensor Santiago – Judge of the International Criminal Court and Senator of the Philippines
- William French Smith – United States Attorney General

== Literature and journalism ==
- Katharine Lee Bates – poet, author, and professor; writer of "America the Beautiful"
- Charles F. Haanel – author, philosopher and a businessman known for his contributions to the New Thought movement through his book The Master Key System.
- Yasser Harrak – writer and political commentator
- Michelle Hartman – author, editor, and poet

== Politics ==
- Ricardo J. Alfaro – President of Panama and Panama Canal Treaty negotiator
- Edgardo Angara – President of the Senate of the Philippines
- William Thaddeus Coleman Jr. – United States Secretary of Transportation and United States Secretary of Transportation
- Royal S. Copeland – United States Senator and mayor of Ann Arbor, Michigan
- Michael Copps – Chairman of the Federal Communications Commission
- Ebenezer Moses Debrah – Ghana High Commissioner to the United Kingdom and Ghana High Commissioner to Australia
- Diana DeGette – U.S. House of Representatives and Colorado House of Representatives
- Juan Ponce Enrile – President of the Senate of the Philippines
- Chuck Grassley – United States Senator and U.S. House of Representatives
- Lucy Somerville Howorth – Mississippi House of Representatives
- Lyndon B. Johnson – President of the United States
- José P. Laurel – President of the Philippines
- David M. Kennedy – U.S. Secretary of the Treasury and Ambassador to NATO
- Ferdinand Marcos – President of the Philippines
- Rikki Mathay – multi-awarded broadcast journalist and Spokesperson and Media Chief in the Senate of the Philippines
- Estelito Mendoza – Secretary of Justice (Philippines) and Governor of Pampanga
- Lester B. Pearson – 1956 Nobel Prize winner, Canadian prime minister, and President of the United Nations General Assembly
- Miriam Defensor Santiago – Senator of the Philippines and Judge of the International Criminal Court
- Reggie Smith – Texas House of Representatives
- Niel Tupas Jr. – House of Representatives of the Philippines

== Religion ==
- David J. Lawson – bishop of the United Methodist Church
- Junius Ralph Magee – bishop of the Methodist Episcopal Church

== Science and medicine ==
- Lochie Jo Allen – entomologist, a pioneer for scientific publications and inclusion of women in fisheries
- Ernst Philip Boas – cardiologist and inventor of the cardiotachometer

== Sports ==
- Bob Boozer – head football coach and athletic director for State University of New York at Brockport
- Lem Burnham – professional football player
- James Naismith – inventor of basketball

== Other ==
- Jane Addams – 1931 Nobel Prize winner, settlement activist, reformer, and social worker
- Richard E. Byrd – the pioneering American polar explorer and famous aviator
- Raymond Adam Kline – president of the National Academy of Public Administration; former Deputy and Acting Administrator, General Services Administration

== See also ==
- List of Pi Gamma Mu chapters
