= List of Pi Gamma Mu chapters =

Pi Gamma Mu is an international honor society for the social sciences. Chapters bear the names of their respective states along with a Greek letter denoting their order of precedence within each state as determined by the charter date. Hence, the chapter at the University of Wyoming is known as the Wyoming Alpha chapter, being the first to be chartered in that state.

Following is an incomplete chapter list, with active chapters indicated in bold and inactive chapters and institutions in italics. Locations are in the United States unless specified.

Chapter	Charter date and range	Institution	Location	Status	Ref.
**Kansas Alpha**	1924	Southwestern College	Winfield, Kansas	Active	(Note: Founding chapter of Pi Gamma Mu.)
Virginia Alpha	1924–1938	College of William & Mary	Williamsburg, Virginia	Inactive	
Texas Alpha	1924–1978	Southwestern University	Georgetown, Texas	Inactive	
Kentucky Alpha	1924	Berea College	Berea, Kentucky	Inactive	
Ohio Alpha	1924–1939	University of Akron	Akron, Ohio	Inactive	
Ohio Beta	1924	University of Toledo	Toledo, Ohio	Inactive	
Wisconsin Alpha (First)	1924–1937	Lawrence College	Appleton, Wisconsin	Inactive	
Illinois Alpha	1924–1969	North Central College	Naperville, Illinois	Inactive	(Note: Chapter formed at North-Western College, now called North Central College.)
Iowa Alpha	1924–1939	Iowa State University	Ames, Iowa	Inactive	
Montana Alpha	1924–1939; 1952–1954	Montana State University	Bozeman, Montana	Inactive	
Wyoming Alpha	1924–1939	University of Wyoming	Laramie, Wyoming	Inactive	
Texas Beta	1924–1969	Baylor University	Waco, Texas	Inactive	
Oregon Alpha	1924–1978	Willamette University	Salem, Oregon	Inactive	
California Alpha	1924–1958	College of the Pacific	Stockton, California	Inactive	
Alabama Alpha	1924–1940	Birmingham–Southern College	Birmingham, Alabama	Inactive	
Kansas Beta	1924–1958	Washburn College	Topeka, Kansas	Inactive	
Minnesota Alpha	1924	Hamline University	Saint Paul, Minnesota	Inactive	
South Dakota Alpha	1924–1937	Dakota Wesleyan University	Mitchell, South Dakota	Inactive	
Missouri Alpha	1924–1964	Drury College	Springfield, Missouri	Inactive	
Nebraska Alpha	1926	Nebraska Wesleyan University	Lincoln, Nebraska	Inactive	
South Carolina Alpha	1926–1941; 1973	Furman University	Greenville, South Carolina	Inactive	
**South Dakota Beta**	1926–1931, 2015	University of South Dakota	Vermillion, South Dakota	Active	
Texas Gamma	1926–1939	Texas Christian University	Fort Worth, Texas	Inactive	
Pennsylvania Alpha	1926	Grove City College	Grove City, Pennsylvania	Inactive	
Mississippi Alpha	1926–1942	Mississippi A&M College	Mississippi State, Mississippi	Inactive	
New York Alpha	1926–1937	Union College	Schenectady, New York	Inactive	
Maine Alpha	1926–1954	Colby College	Waterville, Maine	Inactive	
Virginia Beta	1926–1940	Randolph–Macon Woman's College	Lynchburg, Virginia	Inactive	
West Virginia Alpha	1926–1937	Marshall College	Huntington, West Virginia	Inactive	
Pennsylvania Beta	1926–1939	Gettysburg College	Gettysburg, Pennsylvania	Inactive	
Colorado Alpha	1927–1983	University of Denver	Denver, Colorado	Inactive	
Illinois Beta	1927–1937	Knox College	Galesburg, Illinois	Inactive	
**Illinois Gamma**	1927–xxxx ?, 2010	Bradley University	Peoria, Illinois	Active	
Illinois Delta	1927–1938	Illinois College	Jacksonville, Illinois	Inactive	
Kansas Gamma	1927–1937	Pittsburg State University	Pittsburg, Kansas	Inactive	
Kansas Delta	1927–1946	Emporia State University	Emporia, Kansas	Inactive	
Kentucky Beta (First)	1927–1938	University of Louisville	Louisville, Kentucky	Inactive, Reassigned	
Missouri Beta	1927–1942, 1968–1972, 1980–1987	Northwest Missouri State University	Maryville, Missouri	Inactive	
North Dakota Alpha	1927–1942	North Dakota State University	Fargo, North Dakota	Inactive	
New York Beta	1927–1942, xxxx ?	Elmira College	Elmira, New York	Inactive	
**New York Gamma**	1927	Alfred University	Alfred, New York	Active	
New York Delta	1927	Albany State University	Albany, Georgia	Inactive	
**Pennsylvania Gamma**	1927	Susquehanna University	Selinsgrove, Pennsylvania	Active	
Pennsylvania Delta	1927–19xx ?, 2006–20xx ?	University of Pennsylvania	Philadelphia, Pennsylvania	Inactive	
Texas Delta	1927–1937	Texas Tech University	Lubbock, Texas	Inactive	
**Texas Epsilon**	1927–1937, xxxx ?	University of North Texas	Denton, Texas	Active	
Virginia Gamma	1927	Longwood College	Farmville, Virginia	Inactive	
Alabama Beta	1928–1939	University of Alabama	Tuscaloosa, Alabama	Inactive	
Alabama Gamma	1928	Howard College	Marion, Alabama	Inactive	
Colorado Beta	1928–1937	Western State Colorado University	Gunnison, Colorado	Inactive	
Florida Alpha	1928	Florida Southern College	Lakeland, Florida	Inactive	
Georgia Alpha	1928–1937	Brenau University	Gainesville, Georgia	Inactive	
Iowa Beta	1928–1953	Simpson College	Indianola, Iowa	Inactive	
**Iowa Gamma**	1928–1984, xxxx ?	University of Northern Iowa	Cedar Falls, Iowa	Active	
Kansas Epsilon	1928–1946	Kansas Wesleyan University	Salina, Kansas	Inactive	
**Louisiana Alpha**	1928–1939, 2009	Louisiana Tech University	Ruston, Louisiana	Active	
Louisiana Beta	1928–1940, 1990	Centenary College of Louisiana	Shreveport, Louisiana	Inactive	
Louisiana Gamma	1928	University of Louisiana at Lafayette	Lafayette, Louisiana	Inactive	(Note: Chapter formed at Southwestern Louisiana Institute of Liberal and Technical Learning, now called the University of Louisiana at Lafayette.)
Mississippi Beta	1928–1982	Mississippi University for Women	Columbus, Mississippi	Inactive	
Nebraska Beta	1928–1946	Hastings College	Hastings, Nebraska	Inactive	
New Mexico Alpha (First)	1928–1940	University of New Mexico	Albuquerque, New Mexico	Inactive	
Ohio Gamma	1928–1950	Muskingum University	New Concord, Ohio	Inactive	
Ohio Delta	1928–1937	Wilmington College	Wilmington, Ohio	Inactive	
Oklahoma Alpha	1928–1950, 1964–1965	Oklahoma City University	Oklahoma City, Oklahoma	Inactive	
Oklahoma Beta	1928–1941	Southwestern Oklahoma State University	Weatherford, Oklahoma	Inactive	
Pennsylvania Epsilon	1928	Pennsylvania State University	State College, Pennsylvania	Inactive	
Pennsylvania Zeta	1928–1959	Albright College	Reading, Pennsylvania	Inactive	
Tennessee Alpha	1928–1981	University of Tennessee at Chattanooga	Chattanooga, Tennessee	Inactive	
Texas Zeta	1928	University of Mary Hardin–Baylor	Belton, Texas	Inactive	
Texas Eta	1928–1953, 1978	Texas State University	San Marcos, Texas	Inactive	(Note: Chapter formed at Southwest Texas State Teachers College, now called Texas State University.)
Virginia Delta	1928–1957, 1989	Emory and Henry College	Emory, Virginia	Inactive	
**Virginia Epsilon**	1928	Radford University	Radford, Virginia	Active	
Washington Alpha	1928–1968	University of Puget Sound	Tacoma, Washington	Inactive	
Washington Beta	1928–1938	Washington State University	Pullman, Washington	Inactive, Reassigned	
**West Virginia Beta**	1928	Fairmont State University	Fairmont, West Virginia	Active	
California Beta	1929	California State University, Fresno	Fresno, California	Inactive	
**District of Columbia Alpha**	1929	Catholic University of America	Washington, D.C.	Active	
Florida Beta	1929–1939	University of Florida	Gainesville, Florida	Inactive	
Florida Gamma	1929–1942	Stetson University	DeLand, Florida	Inactive	
Georgia Beta	1929–1971	Georgia State College for Women	Milledgeville, Georgia	Inactive	
**Hawaii Alpha**	1929–1960, xxxx ?	University of Hawaiʻi at Mānoa	Honolulu, Hawaii	Active	
Iowa Delta (First)	1929–1960	Morningside University	Sioux City, Iowa	Inactive	
Illinois Epsilon	1929–1986	DePaul University	Chicago, Illinois	Inactive	
Illinois Zeta	1929–1966	Loyola University Chicago	Chicago, Illinois	Inactive	
**Indiana Alpha**	1929–1973, xxxx ?	University of Evansville	Evansville, Indiana	Active	
Minnesota Beta	1929–1946	Gustavus Adolphus College	St. Peter, Minnesota	Inactive	
Missouri Gamma	1929–1954	Missouri State University	Springfield, Missouri	Inactive	(Note: Chapter formed at Southwest Missouri State Teachers College, now Missouri State University.)
Missouri Delta	1929–1949	Lindenwood University	St. Charles, Missouri	Inactive	
North Carolina Alpha	1929	Elon University	Elon, North Carolina	Inactive	
Nebraska Gamma	1929–1941	Peru State College	Peru, Nebraska	Inactive	
New York Epsilon	1929–1958	Adelphi University	Garden City, New York	Inative	
New York Zeta	1929–1955	Syracuse University	Syracuse, New York	Inactive	
**Ohio Epsilon**	1929–1938, xxxx ?	Baldwin Wallace University	Berea, Ohio	Active	
Oklahoma Gamma	1929–1958	Oklahoma State University	Stillwater, Oklahoma	Inactive	
Oklahoma Delta	1929–1964, 1978	University of Tulsa	Tulsa, Oklahoma	Inactive	
**Oklahoma Epsilon**	1929–1937, 1941	University of Science and Arts of Oklahoma	Chickasha, Oklahoma	Active	
Oregon Beta	1929	Linfield College	McMinnville, Oregon	Inactive	
Pennsylvania Eta	1929–1954	Temple University	Philadelphia, Pennsylvania	Inactive	
Pennsylvania Theta	1929–1971, 2006–2007, 2009–20xx ?	Slippery Rock University	Slippery Rock, Pennsylvania	Inactive	
South Dakota Gamma	1929	South Dakota State University	Brookings, South Dakota	Inactive	
Texas Theta	1929–1937, 1950	Hardin–Simmons University	Abilene, Texas	Inactive	
Wisconsin Beta	1929–1942	Carroll College	Waukesha, Wisconsin	Inactive	
**Arkansas Alpha**	1930–1937, xxxx ?	Ouachita Baptist University	Arkadelphia, Arkansas	Active	
District of Columbia Beta	1930–1959	George Washington University	Washington, D.C.	Inative	
**Illinois Eta**	1930–1980, 1990–2006, 2015	Wheaton College	Wheaton, Illinois	Active	
Illinois Theta	1930–1968, 1989	Illinois State University	Normal, Illinois	Inactive	(Note: Chapter formed at Illinois State Normal University, now called Illinois State University.)
Indiana Beta	1930–1937, 1951–1963	Hanover College	Hanover, Indiana	Inactive	
**Kansas Eta**	1930–1942, 1966	Baker University	Baldwin City, Kansas	Active	
Kansas Zeta (First)	1930–1943	Ottawa University	Ottawa, Kansas	Inactive	
Missouri Epsilon	1930	William Jewell College	Liberty, Missouri	Inactive	
Pennsylvania Iota	1930–1971	Penn West Clarion	Clarion, Pennsylvania	Inactive	(Note: Chapter formed at Clarion State Normal School, now called Pennsylvania Western University, Clarion or Penn West Clarion.)
South Dakota Delta	1930–1938	Yankton College	Yankton, South Dakota	Inactive	
Tennessee Beta	1930–1962	Sewanee: The University of the South	Sewanee, Tennessee	Inactive	
Texas Iota	1930–1938	Trinity University	San Antonio, Texas	Inactive	
District of Columbia Gamma	1931	American University	Washington, D.C.	Inactive	
Illinois Iota	1931–1952	Illinois Wesleyan University	Bloomington, Illinois	Inactive	
Indiana Gamma	1931	Ball State University	Muncie, Indiana	Inactive	
Kansas Theta (First)	1931–1954	Fort Hays State University	Hays, Kansas	Inactive	
**Missouri Zeta**	1931–1979	Missouri Valley College	Marshall, Missouri	Active	
New York Eta	1931–1937	New York University	New York City, New York	Inactive	
**Pennsylvania Kappa**	1931–1940, 1969	Commonwealth University-Mansfield	Mansfield, Pennsylvania	Active	
Texas Kappa	1931	Sam Houston State University	Huntsville, Texas	Inactive	
**New York Theta**	April 22, 1932	Keuka College	Keuka Park, New York	Active	
Colorado Gamma	April 29, 1932 – 1965	Colorado State University	Fort Collins, Colorado	Inactive	(Note: Chapter formed at Colorado Agricultural College, now known as Colorado State University.)
**Philippines Alpha**	May 7, 1932	University of the Philippines Diliman	Diliman, Quezon City, Philippines	Active	
Vermont Alpha	May 11, 1932 – 1942	University of Vermont	Burlington, Vermont	Inactive	
Michigan Alpha	May 11, 1932 – 1962	Eastern Michigan University	Ypsilanti, Michigan	Inactive	(Note: Chapter formed at Michigan State Normal School, now Eastern Michigan University.)
District of Columbia Delta	May 12, 1932 – 1951	Georgetown University	Washington, D.C.	Inactive	
Massachusetts Alpha	May 12, 1932 – 1955	Boston University	Boston, Massachusetts	Inactive	
Colorado Delta	May 20, 1932 – 1957	University of Colorado Boulder	Boulder, Colorado	Inactive	
Indiana Delta	May 20, 1932 – 1971	Indiana State University	Terre Haute, Indiana	Inactive	
Florida Delta	June 1, 1932	Rollins College	Winter Park, Florida	Inactive	
West Virginia Gamma	June 1, 1932 – 1957	Concord College	Athens, West Virginia	Inactive	(Note: Chapter formed at Concord State Teachers College, later called Concord College and now called Concord University.)
**Indiana Epsilon (First)**	June 3, 1932 – 1958; 19xx ?	Valparaiso University	Valparaiso, Indiana	Active	
California Gamma	June 6, 1932 – 1939	San Diego State College	San Diego, California	Inactive	(Note: Chapter formed at California State Teacher's College at San Diego, later called San Diego State College and now known as San Diego State University.)
California Delta	1932	University of California, Los Angeles	Los Angeles, California	Inactive	
Ontario Alpha	1932–1941	University of Toronto	Toronto, Ontario, Canada	Inactive	
South Dakota Epsilon	1932	Huron University	Huron, South Dakota	Inactive	(Note: The university closed in 2005.)
Tennessee Gamma	1932–1970	George Peabody College for Teachers	Nashville, Tennessee	Inactive	(Note: George Peabody College merged with Vanderbilt University in 1979.)
Arizona Alpha	1933–1940	Northern Arizona University	Flagstaff, Arizona	Inactive	
North Carolina Beta	1933–1943	Duke University	Durham, North Carolina	Inactive	
**Nebraska Delta**	1933	Wayne State College	Wayne, Nebraska	Active	
**Pennsylvania Lambda**	1933–1951, 1971	Pennsylvania Western University, California	California, Pennsylvania	Active	
**Arkansas Beta**	1933	Arkansas State University	Jonesboro, Arkansas	Active	
Arkansas Gamma	1933–1939	Henderson State University	Arkadelphia, Arkansas	Inactive	
Iowa Epsilon	1934–1941	University of Iowa	Iowa City, Iowa	Inactive	
Ohio Zeta	1934	University of Mount Union	Alliance, Ohio	Inactive	
Tennessee Delta	1934–1941	YMCA Graduate School	Nashville, Tennessee	Inactive	
Montana Beta	1934	University of Montana	Missoula, Montana	Inactive	
Utah Alpha	1934–1952	Utah State University	Logan, Utah	Inactive	
Louisiana Delta	1935–1958	Louisiana State University	Baton Rouge, Louisiana	Inactive	
Missouri Eta	1935–1942	Westminster College	Fulton, Missouri	Inactive	
**Missouri Kappa**	1935	Central Methodist University	Fayette, Missouri	Active	
South Carolina Beta	1935–1949	University of South Carolina	Columbia, South Carolina	Inactive	
Texas Alpha	1935	Southwestern University	Georgetown, Texas	Inactive	
Connecticut Alpha	1936	Trinity College	Hartford, Connecticut	Inactive	
**Massachusetts Beta**	1936–1946, 1959	Regis College	Weston, Massachusetts	Active	
**Pennsylvania Mu**	1937	Franklin & Marshall College	Lancaster, Pennsylvania	Active	
Texas Lambda	1937–1983	Our Lady of the Lake University	San Antonio, Texas	Inactive	
Iowa Zeta	1938–1958	Coe College	Cedar Rapids, Iowa	Inactive	
Michigan Beta	1938–1967	Western Michigan University	Kalamazoo, Michigan	Inactive	
North Carolina Gamma	1938–1943	Davidson College	Davidson, North Carolina	Inactive	
Pennsylvania Nu	1938	Lebanon Valley College	Annville Township, Pennsylvania	Inactive	
South Carolina Gamma	1938–1952	Winthrop University	Rock Hill, South Carolina	Inactive	
**Missouri Mu**	1938–19xx ?, 1959	Park University	Parkville, Missouri	Active	
West Virginia Eta	1938–1946, 1985	Bethany College	Bethany, West Virginia	Inactive	
Arizona Beta	1939–1946	Arizona State University	Tempe, Arizona	Inactive	
Ohio Eta	1939–1971, 1987	Kent State University	Kent, Ohio	Inactive	
South Carolina Delta	1939	Wofford College	Spartanburg, South Carolina	Inactive	
New Jersey Alpha	1940–1960	Drew University	Madison, New Jersey	Inactive	
Minnesota Gamma	1941–1966, 1978–1982, 1989–xxxx ?	St. Catherine University	Saint Paul, Minnesota	Inactive	
New Hampshire Alpha	1941	University of New Hampshire	Durham, New Hampshire	Inactive	
**Kansas Iota**	1946	Emporia State University	Emporia, Kansas	Active	
Minnesota Delta	1946–1965	Macalester College	Saint Paul, Minnesota	Inactive	
Michigan Delta	1947–1973	Michigan State University	East Lansing, Michigan	Inactive	
Missouri Lambda	1947–1949	Saint Louis University	St. Louis, Missouri	Inactive	
**Pennsylvania Xi**	1947–xxxx ?, 2010	Seton Hill University	Greensburg, Pennsylvania	Active	
Pennsylvania Omicron	1948–1960	Lehigh University	Bethlehem, Pennsylvania	Inactive	
**Virginia Zeta**	1948–19xx ?, 2006	University of Mary Washington	Fredericksburg, Virginia	Active	
Minnesota Epsilon	1949–1965	St. Olaf College	Northfield, Minnesota	Inactive	
New York Pi	1949–1969, 1989–xxxx ?	Hofstra University	Hempstead, New York	Inactive	
Virginia Eta	1949–1971, 1983–1984	Randolph–Macon College	Ashland, Virginia	Inactive	
Idaho Alpha	1950	University of Idaho	Moscow, Idaho	Inactive	
Minnesota Zeta	1950–1957, 1985–xxxx ?	University of St. Thomas	Saint Paul, Minnesota	Inactive	
Pennsylvania Rho	1950–1984	Allegheny College	Meadville, Pennsylvania	Inactive	
**Pennsylvania Sigma**	1950	Ursinus College	Collegeville, Pennsylvania	Active	
District of Columbia Epsilon	1951–1973	Dunbarton College of the Holy Cross	Washington, D.C.	Inactive	(Note: The college closed in 1973.)
District of Columbia Zeta	1951–1968	Trinity Washington University	Washington, D.C.	Inactive	
Nebraska Epsilon	1951–1958, 1979–xxxx ?	University of Nebraska Omaha	Omaha, Nebraska	Inactive	
New Mexico Alpha (Second)	1951–1983	New Mexico Highlands University	Tahlequah, Oklahoma	Inactive	
**Oklahoma Zeta**	1951–1958, 1965–1996, 2011	Northeastern State University	Tahlequah, Oklahoma	Active	
**Illinois Kappa**	1953	Dominican University	River Forest, Illinois	Active	(Note: Chapter formed at Rosary College, now called Dominican University.)
Minnesota Eta	1953–1989	College of Saint Teresa	Winona, Minnesota	Inactive	
Pennsylvania Tau	1953–1959	Duquesne University	Pittsburgh, Pennsylvania	Inactive	
Texas Mu	1953–1967	Midwestern State University	Wichita Falls, Texas	Inactive	
California Epsilon	1954	Holy Names University	Oakland, California	Inactive	(Note: The university closed in 2023.)
**Connecticut Beta**	1954–1968, 2006	University of Bridgeport	Bridgeport, Connecticut	Active	
New York Rho	1954–1979	Hobart College	Geneva, New York	Inactive	
**New York Sigma**	1954–xxxx ?, 2015	LeMoyne–Owen College	Memphis, Tennessee	Active	
California Zeta	1955–1966	Pepperdine University	Los Angeles County, California	Inactive	
Illinois Lambda	1955–1969	Western Illinois University	Macomb, Illinois	Inactive	
Kentucky Beta (Second)	1955–1966	Union Commonwealth University	Barbourville, Kentucky	Inactive	
Mississippi Gamma	1955–1982	University of Southern Mississippi	Hattiesburg, Mississippi	Inactive	
**North Carolina Delta**	1955	North Carolina Central University	Durham, North Carolina	Active	
Puerto Rico Alpha	1955–xxxx ?, 2015	Pontifical Catholic University of Puerto Rico	Ponce, Puerto Rico	Inactive	
**Colorado Epsilon**	1956	Colorado College	Colorado Springs, Colorado	Active	
Maryland Alpha	1956–1960, 1984–xxxx ?	Morgan State University	Baltimore, Maryland	Inactive	
Minnesota Theta	1956	University of Minnesota Duluth	Duluth, Minnesota	Inactive	
Nebraska Zeta	1956–1972	University of Nebraska at Kearney	Kearney, Nebraska	Inactive	
Ohio Theta	1956	Ohio University	Athens, Ohio	Inactive	
California Eta	1957–1963	California State University, Long Beach	Long Beach, California	Inactive	
**Louisiana Epsilon**	1957	Southeastern Louisiana University	Hammond, Louisiana	Active	
Minnesota Iota	1957	Concordia College	Moorhead, Minnesota	Inactive	
**North Carolina Epsilon**	1957	Appalachian State University	Boone, North Carolina	Active	
New Mexico Beta	1957–1972	New Mexico State University	Las Cruces, New Mexico	Inactive	
Tennessee Epsilon	1957–1985	Maryville College	Maryville, Tennessee	Inactive	
California Theta	1958	University of Redlands	Redlands, California	Inactive	
**Mississippi Delta**	1958	Delta State University	Cleveland, Mississippi	Active	
Mississippi Epsilon	1958	Mississippi College	Clinton, Mississippi	Inactive	
New York Omicron	1958	LIU Post	Brookville, New York	Inactive	
Tennessee Zeta	1958	Middle Tennessee State University	Murfreesboro, Tennessee	Inactive	
Texas Nu	1958–1981	St. Mary's University, Texas	San Antonio, Texas	Inactive	
Alabama Epsilon	1959–1975	Jacksonville State University	Jacksonville, Alabama	Inactive	
**Georgia Gamma**	1959	Wesleyan College	Macon, Georgia	Active	
Georgia Delta	1959–19xx ?; 2006–20xx ?	LaGrange College	LaGrange, Georgia	Inactive	
Illinois Mu	1959–1981	Monmouth College	Monmouth, Illinois	Inactive	
Illinois Nu	1959–1961	MacMurray College	Jacksonville, Illinois	Inactive	(Note: College closed in 2020.)
Minnesota Kappa	1959	Augsburg University	Minneapolis, Minnesota	Inactive	
New Jersey Beta	1959–1973	Rowan University	Glassboro, New Jersey	Inactive	(Note: Chapter formed at Glassboro State College, now called Rowan University.)
New York Phi	1959	Nazareth University	Pittsford, New York	Inactive	
New York Upsilon	1959	St. John Fisher University	Pittsford, New York	Inactive	
Ohio Iota (First)	1959–1965	Marietta College	Marietta, Ohio	Inactive	
Pennsylvania Upsilon	1959–1971, 1985–1988	Dickinson College	Carlisle, Pennsylvania	Inactive	
Tennessee Nu	1959	St. Mary's		Inactive	
**Wisconsin Alpha (Second)**	1959	Marquette University	Milwaukee, Wisconsin	Active	
**Maryland Beta**	1960	McDaniel College	Westminster, Maryland	Active	
Kansas Zeta (Second)	1961	Sterling College	Sterling, Kansas	Inactive	
Minnesota Lambda	1961–1976	College of St. Scholastica	Duluth, Minnesota	Inactive	
New York Chi	1961	Daemen University	Brooklyn, New York	Inactive	(Note: Chapter formed at Rosary Hill College, now called Daemen University.)
Tennessee Eta	1961–2009, 2012	East Tennessee State University	Johnson City, Tennessee	Inactive	
Washington Beta (Second)	1961–1970	Pacific Lutheran University	Parkland, Washington	Inactive	
Florida Epsilon	1962–1985	Florida A&M University	Tallahassee, Florida	Inactive	
**Illinois Xi**	1962	Elmhurst University	Elmhurst, Illinois	Active	
Missouri Nu	1962–1974	Fontbonne University	Clayton, Missouri	Inactive	
**New Hampshire Beta**	1962	Saint Anselm College	Goffstown, New Hampshire	Active	
New Mexico Gamma	1962	Western New Mexico University	Silver City, New Mexico	Inactive	
**Pennsylvania Pi**	1962–xxxx ?, 2016	Indiana University of Pennsylvania	Indiana, Pennsylvania	Active	
Tennessee Iota	1962–1971	Tusculum University	Tusculum, Tennessee	Inactive	
Tennessee Theta	1962–1970	Tennessee Wesleyan University	Athens, Tennessee	Inactive	
California Iota	1963	Loyola Marymount University	Los Angeles, California	Inactive	
Colorado Zeta	1963–1964	University of Northern Colorado	Greeley, Colorado	Inactive	
**Georgia Epsilon**	1963–1971, 1985–2008, 2012	Shorter University	Rome, Georgia	Active	
Minnesota Mu	1963–1981	Bethel College and Seminary	Arden Hills, Minnesota	Inactive	
North Carolina Eta	1963	Bennett College	Greensboro, North Carolina	Inactive	
New York Psi	1963–1970	Yeshiva University	New York City, New York	Inactive	
Ohio Iota (Second)	1963	Hiram College	Hiram, Ohio	Inactive	
**West Virginia Delta**	1963	University of Charleston	Charleston, West Virginia	Active	
Indiana Epsilon (Second)	1965–1977	Anderson University	Anderson, Indiana	Inactive	
North Carolina Theta	1965–1967	University of North Carolina at Greensboro	Greensboro, North Carolina	Inactive	(Note: Chapter formed at the Woman's College of the University of North Carolina, which became the University of North Carolina at Greensboro in 1967.)
New Jersey Gamma	1965	Montclair State University	Montclair, New Jersey	Inactive	
New York Omega	1965–1970	State University of New York at Oswego	Oswego, New York	Inactive	
Washington Delta	1965–1972	Eastern Washington University	Cheney, Washington	Inactive	
**California Kappa**	1966	California State Polytechnic University, Pomona	Pomona, California	Active	
**New Jersey Delta**	1966–xxxx ?, 2015	Rider University	Lawrence Township, New Jersey	Active	
California Lambda	1967–1969	California State University, Hayward	Hayward, California	Inactive	
Louisiana Zeta	1967	Southeastern Louisiana University	Hammond, Louisiana	Inactive	
Pennsylvania Omega	1967	West Chester University	West Chester, Pennsylvania	Inactive	
South Dakota Zeta	1967–19xx ?, 2012	Presentation College, South Dakota	Aberdeen, South Dakota	Inactive	(Note: The college closed in 2023.)
Texas Xi	1967	University of Texas at Austin	Austin, Texas	Inactive	
California Mu	1968–1981	California Lutheran University	Thousand Oaks, California	Inactive	
California Nu	1968	California Polytechnic State University, San Luis Obispo	San Luis Obispo, California	Inactive	
**New York Tau**	1968–1970, 1984	Pace University	New York City, New York	Active	
**California Xi**	1969	University of La Verne	La Verne, California	Active	
Georgia Zeta	1969	University of West Georgia	Carrollton, Georgia	Inactive	
Mississippi Zeta	1969–xxxx ?, 2010–xxxx ?	William Carey University	Hattiesburg, Mississippi	Inactive	
New Mexico Delta	1969–1975	Santa Fe College	Gainesville, Florida	Inactive	
Pennsylvania Alpha Gamma	1969–1979	Alliance College	Cambridge Springs, Pennsylvania	Inactive	
**Virginia Theta**	1969–xxxx ?, 2009	James Madison University	Harrisonburg, Virginia	Active	
Iowa Delta (Second)	1970–1982	Upper Iowa University	Fayette, Iowa	Inactive	
Massachusetts Gamma	1970	Suffolk University	Boston, Massachusetts	Inactive	
Minnesota Xi	1970	Saint Mary's University of Minnesota	Winona, Minnesota	Inactive	
South Carolina Epsilon	1970	Converse University	Spartanburg, South Carolina	Inactive	
Kentucky Gamma	1971	Morehead State University	Morehead, Kentucky	Inactive	
**Louisiana Eta**	1971	Grambling State University	Grambling, Louisiana	Active	
Pennsylvania Alpha Delta	1971–1990	Gannon University	Erie, Pennsylvania	Active	
**Pennsylvania Alpha Epsilon**	1971	University of Scranton	Scranton, Pennsylvania	Active	
California Omicron	1972–1980, 2006–20xx ?	Mount Saint Mary's University, Los Angeles	Los Angeles, California	Inactive	
Missouri Omicron	1972	Evangel University	Springfield, Missouri	Inactive	
North Carolina Rho	1972	Belmont Abbey College	Belmont, North Carolina	Inactive	
**Pennsylvania Alpha Zeta**	1972	Widener University	Chester, Pennsylvania	Active	
**Pennsylvania Alpha Eta**	1972	Marywood University	Scranton, Pennsylvania	Active	
South Carolina Zeta	1972	Charleston Southern University	North Charleston, South Carolina	Inactive	(Note: Chapter formed from Baptist College of Charleston, now Charleston Southern University.)
**Texas Omicron**	1972	West Texas A&M University	Canyon, Texas	Active	
West Virginia Epsilon	1972	West Virginia Wesleyan College	Buckhannon, West Virginia	Inactive	
North Carolina Sigma	1973–1981	Warren Wilson College	Swannanoa, North Carolina	Inactive	
**North Carolina Tau**	1973	Winston-Salem State University	Winston-Salem, North Carolina	Active	
**Georgia Eta**	1974–19xx ?, 2006	Savannah State University	Savannah, Georgia	Active	
**Kansas Theta (Second)**	1974	Newman University	Wichita, Kansas	Active	
**North Carolina Upsilon**	1974–1985	Fayetteville State University	Fayetteville, North Carolina	Active	
**South Carolina Iota**	1974	Claflin University	Orangeburg, South Carolina	Active	
**Alabama Zeta**	1975	Alabama State University	Montgomery, Alabama	Active	
**New York Alpha Gamma**	1975	Siena College	Loudonville, New York	Active	
**Pennsylvania Alpha Theta**	1975	Waynesburg University	Waynesburg, Pennsylvania	Active	
South Carolina Kappa	1975	South Carolina State University	Orangeburg, South Carolina	Inactive	
Texas Pi	1975	University of St. Thomas	Houston, Texas	Inactive	
**California Pi**	1976	University of California, Irvine	Irvine, California	Active	
California Rho	1976	California State University, Northridge	Los Angeles, California	Inactive	
**Florida Zeta**	1976	Florida State University	Tallahassee, Florida	Active	
**Indiana Zeta**	1976	Indiana Wesleyan University	Marion, Indiana	Active	
North Carolina Phi	1976	Methodist University	Fayetteville, North Carolina	Inactive	
**New York Iota**	1976	Mercy University	Dobbs Ferry, New York	Active	
Pennsylvania Alpha Iota	1976	Eastern University	St. Davids, Pennsylvania	Inactive	
Tennessee Kappa	1976	Union University	Jackson, Tennessee	Inactive	
Texas Rho	1976	Howard Payne University	Brownwood, Texas	Inactive	
Missouri Pi	1977	Missouri Southern State University	Joplin, Missouri	Inactive	
North Carolina Zeta	1977	Guilford College	Greensboro, North Carolina	Inactive	
South Carolina Lambda	1977	Francis Marion University	Florence, South Carolina	Inactive	
**Connecticut Gamma**	1978	Western Connecticut State University	Danbury, Connecticut	Active	
Oklahoma Eta	1978	East Central University	Ada, Oklahoma	Inactive	
Pennsylvania Phi	1978	Lycoming College	Williamsport, Pennsylvania	Inactive	
**Florida Eta**	1979–xxxx ?, 2016	University of South Florida	Tampa, Florida	Active	
**West Virginia Zeta**	1979	Glenville State University	Glenville, West Virginia	Active	
**Georgia Theta**	1980	Valdosta State University	Valdosta, Georgia	Active	
**Illinois Omicron**	1980	Benedictine University	Lisle, Illinois	Active	
**Illinois Omicron**	1980	Benedictine University at Mesa	Mesa, Arizona	Active	
North Carolina Iota	1980	Johnson C. Smith University	Charlotte, North Carolina	Inactive	
**North Carolina Kappa**	1980	Salem College	Winston-Salem, North Carolina	Active	
South Dakota Eta	1980	Northern State University	Aberdeen, South Dakota	Inactive	
California Sigma	1981	California State Polytechnic University, Humboldt	Arcata, California	Inactive	
**New Hampshire Gamma**	1981	Plymouth State University	Plymouth, New Hampshire	Active	
Utah Beta	1981	Weber State University	Ogden, Utah	Inactive	
Virginia Iota	1981	Roanoke College	Salem, Virginia	Inactive	
Vermont Beta	1981–xxxx ?, 2010	Norwich University	Northfield, Vermont	Inactive	
**Georgia Iota**	1982	Clark Atlanta University	Atlanta, Georgia	Active	
**Missouri Theta**	1982	Maryville University	Town and Country, Missouri	Active	
**Mississippi Mu**	1982	Jackson State University	Jackson, Mississippi	Active	
Pennsylvania Chi	1982	Millersville University of Pennsylvania	Millersville, Pennsylvania	Inactive	
**Texas Sigma**	1982	Angelo State University	San Angelo, Texas	Active	
Virginia Kappa	1982	Sweet Briar College	Amherst County, Virginia	Inactive	
Maryland Gamma	1983	Salisbury University	Salisbury, Maryland	Inactive	
**North Carolina Lambda**	1983	Western Carolina University	Cullowhee, North Carolina	Active	
**North Carolina Mu**	1983	Campbell University	Buies Creek, North Carolina	Active	
**New York Kappa**	1983	St. Bonaventure University	St. Bonaventure, New York	Active	
Oregon Gamma	1983	University of Oregon	Eugene, Oregon	Inactive	
Maryland Delta	1984	University of Baltimore	Baltimore, Maryland	Inactive	
Minnesota Nu	1984	Southwest Minnesota State University	Marshall, Minnesota	Inactive	
**North Carolina Nu**	1984	St. Andrews University	Laurinburg, North Carolina	Active	
South Carolina Eta	1985	Presbyterian College	Clinton, South Carolina	Inactive	
Iowa Eta	1987	Wartburg College	Waverly, Iowa	Inactive	
**Maryland Epsilon**	1987	Coppin State University	Baltimore, Maryland	Active	
**New York Lambda**	1987	St. Thomas Aquinas College	Sparkill, New York	Active	
Massachusetts Delta	1989	Wheelock College	Boston Massachusetts	Inactive	(Note: College closed in 2018.)
**New York Mu**	1989–19xx ?, 2006	Dominican University New York	Orangeburg, New York	Active	
**Texas Tau**	1989	Texas Wesleyan University	Fort Worth, Texas	Active	
Colorado Eta	1990	Metropolitan State University of Denver	Denver, Colorado	Inactive	
**Florida Theta**	1990	Barry University	Miami Shores, Florida	Active	
Philippines Beta	1990–xxxx ?, 2015	De La Salle University	Manila, Philippines	Inactive	
**Tennessee Lambda**	1994	Cumberland University	Lebanon, Tennessee	Active	
Pennsylvania Alpha Nu	2005	Holy Family University	Philadelphia, Pennsylvania	Inactive	
**Missouri Iota**	2006	Hannibal–LaGrange University	Hannibal, Missouri	Active	
Arkansas Epsilon	2006	Philander Smith University	Little Rock, Arkansas	Inactive	
**Delaware Alpha**	2006	Delaware State University	Dover, Delaware	Active	
**Delaware Beta**	2006	Wilmington University	New Castle, Delaware	Active	
**Georgia Omicron**	2006	Fort Valley State University	Fort Valley, Georgia	Active	
Maryland Eta	2006	University of Maryland Eastern Shore	Princess Anne, Maryland	Inactive	
**Maryland Theta**	2006	University of Maryland Global Campus	Adelphi, Maryland	Active	
Mississippi Theta	2006	Blue Mountain Christian University	Blue Mountain, Mississippi	Inactive	
North Carolina Chi	2006	Lenoir–Rhyne University	Hickory, North Carolina	Inactive	
**Pennsylvania Alpha Xi**	2006	Wilson College	Chambersburg, Pennsylvania	Active	
Kuwait Alpha	2007	American University of Kuwait	Salmiya, Hawalli Governorate, Kuwait	Inactive	
**North Carolina Pi**	2008–2009, 2013	Saint Augustine's University	Raleigh, North Carolina	Active	
**Kansas Kappa**	2009	Central Christian College of Kansas	McPherson, Kansas	Active	
**Massachusetts Epsilon**	2009	Springfield College	Springfield, Massachusetts	Active	
**Missouri Xi**	2010	Harris–Stowe State University	St. Louis, Missouri	Active	
**West Virginia Iota**	2010	American Military University	Charles Town, West Virginia	Active	
**Florida Lambda**	2011	Saint Leo University	St. Leo, Florida	Active	
Alabama Eta	2012	Athens State University	Athens, Alabama	Inactive	
**Arkansas Zeta**	2012	University of Arkansas at Little Rock	Little Rock, Arkansas	Active	
**Colorado Theta**	2012	Adams State University	Alamosa, Colorado	Active	
Arkansas Eta	2013	University of Arkansas	Fayetteville, Arkansas	Inactive	
Kansas Lambda	2013	Wichita State University	Wichita, Kansas	Inactive	
Minnesota Omicron	2013	Capella University	Minneapolis, Minnesota	Inactive	
**Utah Zeta**	2013	University of Utah	Salt Lake City, Utah	Active	
**North Carolina Omega**	2013	Livingstone College	Salisbury, North Carolina	Active	
Florida Mu	2013	Bethune–Cookman University	Daytona Beach, Florida	Inactive	
Washington Gamma	2013	Northwest University	Kirkland, Washington	Inactive	
**North Carolina Alpha Beta**	2014	Chowan University	Murfreesboro, North Carolina	Active	
Arizona Gamma	2015	University of Phoenix	Phoenix, Arizona	Inactive	
Illinois Sigma	2015	Knox College	Galesburg, Illinois	Inactive	
Connecticut Delta	2015	University of New Haven	West Haven, Connecticut	Inactive	
**Pennsylvania Alpha Kappa**	2015	University of Pittsburgh at Greensburg	Hempfield Township, Pennsylvania	Active	
**Oregon Delta**	2016	Bushnell University	Eugene, Oregon	Active	
**Kentucky Delta**	2016	University of Kentucky	Lexington, Kentucky	Active	
Tennessee Xi	2016	University of Memphis	Memphis, Tennessee	Inactive	
Kansas Mu	2016	University of Saint Mary	Leavenworth, Kansas	Inactive	
**Texas Omega**	2016	East Texas Baptist University	Marshall, Texas	Active	
**Oklahoma Kappa**	2017	Northwestern Oklahoma State University	Alva, Oklahoma	Active	
**California Phi**	April 2018	Fresno Pacific University	Fresno, California	Active	
**Michigan Zeta**	2019	Madonna University	Livonia, Michigan	Active	
California Psi	2019	Sonoma State University	Rohnert Park, California	Inactive	
**Virginia Mu**	2019	George Mason University	Fairfax, Virginia	Active	
Washington Epsilon	2019	Walla Walla University	College Place, Washington	Inactive	
**New Mexico Epsilon**	2019	University of the Southwest	Hobbs, New Mexico	Active	
New Jersey Zeta	2019	William Paterson University	Wayne, New Jersey	Inactive	
**New York Alpha Epsilon**	2019	Marymount Manhattan College	Manhattan, New York	Active	
New Jersey Eta	2019	Bloomfield College	Bloomfield, New Jersey	Inactive	
**New Jersey Theta**	2019	Stevens Institute of Technology	Hoboken, New Jersey	Active	
**New Jersey Iota**	2019	Rutgers University–Camden	Camden, New Jersey	Active	
**Georgia Upsilon**	2019	Georgia Southern University	Statesboro, Georgia	Active	
**South Carolina Xi**	2019	Voorhees College	Denmark, South Carolina	Active	
**Iowa Theta**	2019	St. Ambrose University	Davenport, Iowa	Active	
**Virginia Nu**	August 23, 2022	Virginia Commonwealth University	Richmond, Virginia	Active	
**Alabama Delta**	19xx ?–xxxx ?, 2016	Troy University	Troy, Alabama	Active	
**Arkansas Delta**		Southern Arkansas University	Magnolia, Arkansas	Active	
**California Tau**		University of San Francisco	San Francisco, California	Active	
**California Upsilon**		American Jewish University	Los Angeles, California	Active	
**California Chi**		Soka University of America	Aliso Viejo, California	Active	
**Connecticut Epsilon**		University of Saint Joseph	West Hartford, Connecticut	Active	
**Florida Kappa**		Warner University	Lake Wales, Florida	Active	
**Florida Nu**		University of Central Florida	Orlando, Florida	Active	
**Florida Pi**		Miami Dade College	Miami, Florida	Active	
**Florida Xi**		Jacksonville University	Jacksonville, Florida	Active	
**Georgia Kappa**		University of North Georgia	Dahlonega, Georgia	Active	
**Georgia Lambda**		Georgia State University	Atlanta, Georgia	Active	
**Georgia Mu**		Emmanuel University	Franklin Springs, Georgia	Active	
**Georgia Xi**		Brewton–Parker Christian University	Mount Vernon, Georgia	Active	
Georgia Rho		Reinhardt University	Waleska, Georgia	Inactive	
**Georgia Sigma**		South University	Savannah, Georgia	Active	
**Georgia Tau**		Middle Georgia State University	Macon, Georgia	Active	
**Illinois Pi**		McKendree University	Lebanon, Illinois	Active	
Illinois Rho		Eureka College	Eureka, Illinois	Inactive	
**Indiana Theta**		Manchester University	North Manchester, Indiana	Active	
**Kansas Nu**		Fort Hays State University	Hays, Kansas	Active	
Louisiana Theta	19xx ?–xxxx ?, 2010	University of Holy Cross	New Orleans, Louisiana	Inactive	
Louisiana Iota		Dillard University	New Orleans, Louisiana	Inactive	
Louisiana Kappa		University of New Orleans	New Orleans, Louisiana	Inactive	
**Massachusetts Zeta**		Massachusetts College of Liberal Arts	North Adams, Massachusetts	Active	
**Massachusetts Eta**		College of Our Lady of the Elms	Chicopee, Massachusetts	Active	
**Michigan Gamma**		Siena Heights University	Adrian, Michigan	Active	
Michigan Epsilon		Marygrove College	Detroit, Michigan	Inactive	(Note: College closed in 2019.)
**Mississippi Eta**	xxxx ?–xxxx ?, 2006	Alcorn State University	Lorman, Mississippi	Active	
**Mississippi Nu**		University of Mississippi	University, Mississippi	Active	
Missouri Rho		Columbia College	Columbia, Missouri	Inactive	
**Nebraska Theta**		Midland University	Fremont, Nebraska	Active	
**New Jersey Epsilon**		Fairleigh Dickinson University	Madison, New Jersey	Active	
**New York Nu**		St. Joseph's University	Brooklyn and Long Island, New York	Active	
**North Carolina Xi**		North Carolina Wesleyan University	Rocky Mount, North Carolina	Active	
North Dakota Beta		Mayville State University	Mayville, North Dakota	Inactive	
**Ohio Kappa**		Tiffin University	Tiffin, Ohio	Active	
**Ohio Lambda**		Central State University	Wilberforce, Ohio	Active	
Oklahoma Theta	xxxx ?–xxxx ?, 2009	Oklahoma Baptist University	Shawnee, Oklahoma	Inactive	
**Oklahoma Iota**		Langston University	Langston, Oklahoma	Active	
**Pennsylvania Psi**		University of Pittsburgh at Bradford	Bradford, Pennsylvania	Active	
Pennsylvania Alpha Beta		Penn State Harrisburg	Lower Swatara Township, Pennsylvania	Inactive	
**Pennsylvania Alpha Lambda**		Lincoln University	Lower Oxford Township, Pennsylvania	Active	
**Pennsylvania Alpha Omicron**		Washington & Jefferson College	Washington, Pennsylvania	Active	
**Pennsylvania Alpha Pi**		Robert Morris University	Moon Township, Pennsylvania	Active	
**Pennsylvania Alpha Rho**		Immaculata University	East Whiteland Township, Pennsylvania	Active	
**South Carolina Theta**		University of South Carolina Aiken	Aiken, South Carolina	Active	
**South Carolina Nu**		Allen University	Columbia, South Carolina	Active	
**Tennessee Mu**		University of Tennessee Southern	Pulaski, Tennessee	Active	
**Texas Upsilon**		University of Houston–Downtown	Houston, Texas	Active	
Texas Phi		Texas A&M University	College Station, Texas	Inactive	
**Texas Psi**		Huston–Tillotson University	Austin, Texas	Active	
**Texas Alpha Beta**		St. Edward's University	Austin, Texas	Active	
**Vermont Gamma**		Castleton University	Castleton, Vermont	Active	
**West Virginia Theta**		Bluefield State University	Bluefield, West Virginia	Active	
Wisconsin Eta		University of Wisconsin–Platteville	Platteville, Wisconsin	Inactive	
