= KGTS =

Radio station in College Place, Washington

- College Place, Washington; United States
- Broadcast area: Walla Walla, Washington
- Frequency: 91.3 MHz
- Branding: Positive Life Radio

Programming
- Format: Christian radio

Ownership
- Owner: Walla Walla University
- Sister stations: KPLL-LP

History
- First air date: October 5, 1963
- Call sign meaning: Gateway to service

Technical information
- Licensing authority: FCC
- Facility ID: 70732
- Class: C2
- ERP: 7,000 watts
- HAAT: 381 meters (1,250 ft)
- Transmitter coordinates: 45°59′20″N 118°10′29″W

Links
- Public license information: Public file; LMS
- Webcast: Listen Live
- Website: plr.org

KGTS (91.3 FM) is a radio station in College Place, Washington, broadcasting to the Walla Walla Valley, including Walla Walla, Washington, and the Tri-Cities. The station oversees the programming for the Positive Life Radio broadcasting network, which covers seven full-power radio stations throughout the Columbia River valley and eight translator stations. It is owned by Walla Walla University.

== History ==
KGTS was founded in 1963 on the campus of Walla Walla University, then Walla Walla College. At that time, it was the first FM station in the Walla Walla Valley. The station manager Loren Dickinson operated the radio station with the help of volunteers, featuring news, classical music, and religious programming.
