= S95 =

S95 may refer to:

- Canon PowerShot S95, a digital camera
- Martin Field (Washington), in Walla Walla County, Washington, United States
