= WWVA =

WWVA may refer to:

- WWVA (AM), a radio station (1170 AM) licensed to Wheeling, West Virginia, United States
- WOVK-FM, a radio station (98.7 FM) licensed to Wheeling, West Virginia, United States which originally held the WWVA-FM callsign from 1947 into the 1970s
- WWVA Jamboree, also known as Jamboree USA and currently known as The Wheeling Jamboree, a country music program
- WBZY, a radio station (105.7 FM) licensed to Canton, Georgia, United States, which held the call sign WWVA-FM from 2005 to 2013
- Walla Walla Valley Academy, a Seventh-day Adventist high school in College Place, Washington
- White Waltham Village Association, Village Association of a small village in Berkshire, England
