= Dybdahl =

Dybdahl is a surname which originates from Denmark and Norway. Dybdahl means "deep valley" and there are multiple locations in both Denmark and Norway that are called Dybdahl. In some cases people living in these locations took Dybdahl as their surname. In Denmark most (>90%) people named Dybdahl or Dybdal have their surname from one of four locations in the villages Skyum, Sejerslev, Hellevad and Stouby.

Dybdal is an alternative spelling of Dybdahl. Before 1900 both spellings could be used for the same person.

In 2010 there were 691 people in Denmark and 777 in Norway with Dybdal or Dybdahl as their last name according to the national statistics agencies. In addition there are a number with Dybdal or Dybdahl as their middle name.

Dybdahl may refer to:

- Thomas Dybdahl, a Norwegian singer
- Thomas Dybdahl Ahle, author of the chess programs PyChess and Sunfish.
- Jon Dybdahl, an American theologian
