= Michelle Hartman =

Michelle Hartman may refer to:

- Michelle Hartman (poet) (born 1956), American author and poet
- Michelle Hartman (translator), Canadian academic and translator
