= Edward Alexander Sutherland =

American academic administrator (1865–1955)

- Sutherland, c. 1930s

1st President of Nashville Agricultural and Normal Institute
- In office 1904–1946
- Preceded by: Position established
- Succeeded by: Thomas Wilson Steen

6th President of Emmanuel Missionary College
- In office 1897–1904
- Preceded by: George Washington Caviness
- Succeeded by: Nelson Walker Kauble

2nd President of Walla Walla College
- In office 1894–1897
- Preceded by: W. W. Prescott
- Succeeded by: Emmett J. Hibbard

Personal details
- Born: March 3, 1865 Prairie du Chien, Wisconsin, United States
- Died: June 20, 1955 (aged 90) Madison, Tennessee, United States
- Spouse(s): Sallie Viola Bralliar (m. 1890; died 1954) M. Bessie DeGraw (m. 1954)
- Children: 2
- Education: Battle Creek College (BA); Vanderbilt University (MD)

Edward Alexander Sutherland (March 3, 1865 – June 20, 1955) was an American educator who worked as a President of several Seventh-day Adventist colleges such as Walla Walla University.

Born in Wisconsin, he first graduated in Battle Creek College, now called Andrews University, with a Bachelor of Arts. He later worked as a teacher of various secondary schools before being appointed President of Walla Walla College by W. W. Prescott and then Battle Creek College by George A. Irwin.

Sutherland would later resign in 1904 and founded Madison School, later called Madison College, in Tennessee, where he served the role of President of the institution from 1904 to 1946. After retiring from Presidency, he later held titles of President and secretary of numerous organizations before his death in 1955.

== Early life and ecudation ==
Edward Alexander Sutherland was born on March 3, 1865 in Prairie du Chien, Wisconsin, to Joseph Sutherland and Mary Rankin, who were first-generation converts of Seventh-day adventism. His father came from Canada to the United States was a farmer and educator who settled in Wisconsin and later in Iowa.

Sutherland entered Battle Creek College (now Andrews University) in 1883, intending to enroll at a pre-medical course taught by John Harvey Kellogg, although this didn't come to fruition as only one other student enrolled in the course. Instead, he took English courses and returned home to teach school, only to then return to the College by 1886, later meeting his lifelong friend, Percy T. Magan. He subsequently graduated in the institution with a Bachelor of Arts in 1890. He later studied in Vanderbilt University. By 1914, he graduated with a Doctor of Medicine at the University of Tennessee.

== Career ==
During his education, Sutherland was teaching at the secondary schools from 1883 to 1886. He also taught at an Adventist school in Minneapolis from 1890 to 1891. While teaching the Bible at Battle Creek College, the then president of the college and secretary of the General Conference of Seventh-day Adventists, W. W. Prescott, appointed Sutherland as the next President of the newly formed Walla Walla College in 1894.

During his time in Walla Walla, delegates of the General Conference were impressed by Sutherland's education program that the new president of the Conference, George A. Irwin, appointed him to serve Battle Creek College as President in 1897, succeeding George Washington Caviness, with his friend Magan as dean. They vowed that they would follow the counseling of Ellen G. White as they could, which led to strife among fellow adventists.

Among her teachings, White has said that Adventist schools should be located on a farm, which proved difficult as Battle Creek had grown out to the school. Sutherland, following her lesson, transformed the college playing field into a garden and bought an 80 acre (32.37 ha) farm a mile away from the college. This would later proved unsuccessful because of the distance between the farm and the institution. Sutherland would also stopped granting degrees and wanted lessons like English and Science to taught from the Bible and White's writings. He also built a broom factory and facilities for manual labour to make the students experience on-the-job learning.

In 1901, by the recommendation of White, the General Conference voted for the college's removal from Battle Creek to a newly-made farm at Berrien Springs, and renamed the institution Emmanuel Missionary College. Sutherland and Magan followed through to their orders, moving the institution to Michigan, where they had a farm and a school. Sutherland continued working as the President of the newly renamed college until May 1904, where he, Magan, and M. Bessie DeGraw, publicly resigned at the Lake Union Conference session.

=== Madison College ===
Bralliar Hall at Madison College, taken c. 1930s

After the meeting, White traveled to Nashville, Tennessee to visit her son, James Edson White, to see what he has done for the black people within the area. When plans were made to travel the Cumberland River on Edson's missionary boat, the Morningstar, to search for a spot for a training school for black people, Ellen telegraphed Sutherland and Magan to come alone to Nashville to lay out their plans on building a new institution. After relaying their plans, White advised them to establish a building close to an important center of influence and suggested to locate at a dilapidated farm in Madison, which is near Nashville.

After that, he, alongside Magan and DeGraw, moved south to operate a school with little adventist interference. They purchased a 414 acre (167.54 ha) tract of land on the Cumberland River, called the Nelson Farm. They returned to Berrien Springs to raise funds and find students willing to transfer institutions, where the students would then go out and start self-sustaining institutions themselves after the American Civil War. He and others founded the Madison School (later called the Madison College) in 1904, with 11 charter students agreeing to transfer. The institution then became the Nashville Agricultural and Normal Institute in 1905.

Sutherland and staff started out developing an institute from a farm, They intended to add a sanitorium inside the institution. While staff members were having a picnic at a grove of trees, White suggested that this spot would be a good place for a sanitorium. Later, in 1905, a Nashville businessman came to the school to find a quiet spot to recuperate his health, where he eventually recovered. Serious planning were considered by 1906, where donations from friends made the opening of the Madison Rural Sanitarium in June 1908, located where White suggested the place to be. The sanitorium needed a physician to attract patients, so, Sutherland and staff hired Dr. Newton Evans, Sutherland's college friend, into the institution, where he would practice medicine within the sanitorium and teach pathology at the University of Tennessee College of Medicine.

Evans, feeling a call to the College of Medical Evangelists (now the Loma Linda University), had asked Sutherland and Magan to take a medical program before he would move to Loma Linda, California. He agreed to stay in Madison while Sutherland and Magan studied at Vanderbilt University to achieve a medical degree. After the both of them became physicians able to treat patients, Evans departed to California.

The University needed a teaching hospital in Los Angeles to make Madison College become accredited. The board of directors selected Magan to develop the hospital, which was an expensive thing to achieve. Although the General Conference supported a fundraiser, funds were given slowly for institutions in Loma Linda. Despite this, Sutherland attracted Lida Funk Scott, daughter and heiress to a share of Isaac K. Funk's company, Funk & Wagnalls. Having converted to the Adventist Church in Battle Creek, Scott wanted to help the College. Sutherland suggested to support the teaching hospital in California.

Scott donated thousands of dollars to the College of Medical Evangelists, with a $30,000 funding on the start of the Adventist White Memorial Hospital, at the College's infancy. Many physicians arrived in Madison College, making the institution prosper into a golden age by 1920 to 1950.

He held the role as President of that institution until 1946 and as trustee until 1951. His presidency was succeeded by Thomas Wilson Steen.

=== Later life and death ===
From 1924 until his death, Sutherland served as the President of the Layman Foundation, an organization which fostered other self-supporting institutions patterned after Madison. He aldo worked as the chairman of the Druillard Trust from 1946 up until his death.

Later, in 1946, he became executive secretary of the newly formed Association of Self-Supporting Institutions for four years. At the same time, he also became executive secretary of the Seventh-day Adventist Commission on Rural Living. At one time, he was a member of the Tennessee State Board for Licensing in the Healing Arts.

Edward Alexander Sutherland died on June 20, 1955, in Madison, Tennessee.

== Personal life ==
Sutherland married twice in his life. He first married on August 13, 1890, in Paw Paw, Michigan, to Sallie Viola Bralliar and had two children together. Bralliar died in 1953, and he remarried on April 14, 1954, in Madison, Tennessee, to M. Bessie DeGraw.
