= Niels-Erik Andreasen =

Professor of Old Testament studies

5th President of Andrews University
- In office 1994–2016

Niels-Erik Andreasen (born 1941) is a Biblical and religious scholar who was the president of Andrews University in Berrien Springs, Michigan, from 1994 to 2016.

== Work ==
Born in Fredensborg, Denmark, Andreasen lived in Denmark for his first 19 years. He then studied at Newbold College, England, for three years and immigrated to the United States in 1963.

Andreasen graduated in 1963 with a bachelor's degree in religion and history from Newbold College, Bracknell, England. He holds two degrees from Andrews University: a master of arts in Biblical studies, which he received in 1965; and a bachelor of divinity degree, 1966. In 1971, he received a doctorate degree in religious studies from Vanderbilt University, Nashville, Tenn.

In 1970, Andreasen began what has been more than a quarter of a century of teaching and leadership posts for Seventh-day Adventist colleges and universities. From 1970 to 1977, he taught religion at Pacific Union College, Angwin, California. From 1977 to 1990, he served in various positions at Loma Linda University (Riverside and Loma Linda, California, campuses). His most recent position at that institution was dean of the Loma Linda University School of Religion. In addition, he was a visiting lecturer in Australia, England, El Salvador, Costa Rica, Hong Kong, Puerto Rico, France, Germany, and New Zealand.

In 1990, Andreasen was named president of Walla Walla College (now Walla Walla University), College Place, Washington. He served in that capacity until July 1994, when he became the fifth president of Andrews University.

Andreasen is the author of three books, including "The Christian Use of Time" and "The Old Testament Sabbath," as well as various articles and reviews.

He has served on several hospital boards and Seventh-day Adventist executive committees, including executive committees of the Upper Columbia, North Pacific Union and Lake Union conferences.

He is a member of the Society of Biblical Literature.

== Works ==
- The Old Testament Sabbath a Tradition: Historical Investigation. Missoula, MT: Society of Biblical Literature 1972.
- The Christian Use of Time. Nashville, TN: Abingdon 1978.
- Rest and Redemption: A Study of the Biblical Sabbath. Andrews University Monographs - Studies in Religion 11. Berrien Springs, MI: Andrews UP 1978.
- Maureen Kenny, ed. (2002). "Civic Responsibility Through Mutual Transformation of Town and Gown". Learning to serve: promoting civil society through service learning. Springer. ISBN 978-0-7923-7577-7.

== See also ==
- Seventh-day Adventist Church
- Seventh-day Adventist theology
- Seventh-day Adventist eschatology
- History of the Seventh-day Adventist Church
- 28 fundamental beliefs
- Teachings of Ellen White § End times
- Inspiration of Ellen White
- Prophecy in the Seventh-day Adventist Church
- Investigative judgment
- The Pillars of Adventism
- Second Advent
- Baptism by Immersion
- Conditional Immortality
- Historicism
- Three Angels' Messages
- End times
- Sabbath in Seventh-day Adventism
- Inspiration of Ellen White
- Ellen G. White
- Adventist Review
- Adventist
- Seventh-day Adventist Church Pioneers
- Seventh-day Adventist worship
- Seventh-day Adventist Church
- Seventh-day Adventist theology
- Seventh-day Adventist eschatology
- History of the Seventh-day Adventist Church
