= Adventist Health Portland =

- Adventist Health
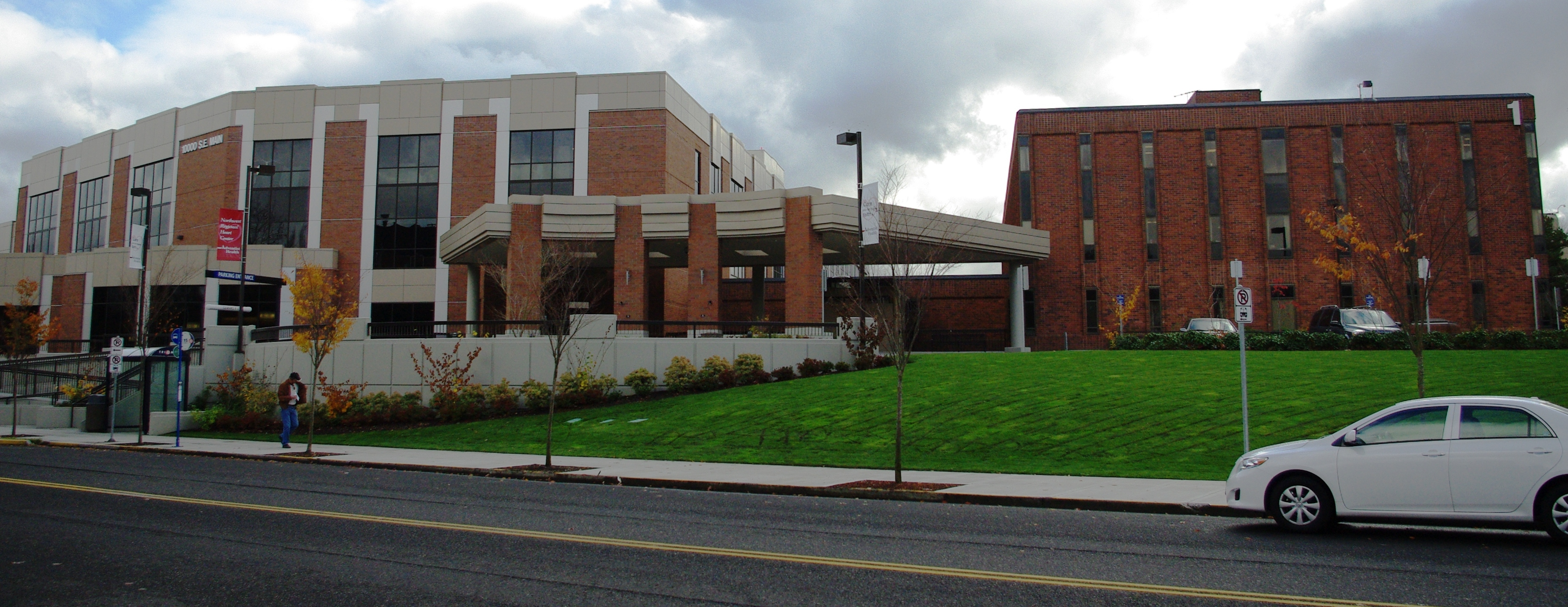

Geography
- Location: Portland, Multnomah County, Oregon, United States
- Coordinates: 45.51278°N 122.5585°W

Organization
- Care system: Medicare/Medicaid/Charity/Public
- Type: General, Teaching
- Affiliated university: Walla Walla University School of Nursing

Services
- Beds: 302

History
- Founded: 1893

Links
- Website: adventisthealth.org/portland/
- Lists: Hospitals in Oregon

Adventist Health Portland (formerly Portland Adventist Medical Center), is a 302-bed hospital serving 900,000 residents on the east side of the Portland-Vancouver metropolitan area in the United States.. The organization employs more than 2,300 staff and also operates a 32-bed emergency department, and a network of 27 clinics, along with urgent care, home care, and hospice services. It is the primary teaching hospital of the Walla Walla University Nursing program.

== History ==
In 1893, Lewis Belknap, M.D., headed west from Michigan where he had been a student at Dr. Harvey Kellogg's Battle Creek Sanitarium, intending to start a similar sanitarium on the West Coast. He arrived in Portland, Oregon penniless after having been robbed while in San Francisco. An Adventist minister by the name of Starbuck lent him the first month's rent for small house where Belknap set up a medical practice. Along with his wife, he operated a six patient facility on East Twelfth St. in Portland.

The couple soon relocated to the Reed Mansion, which provided them with 20 patient beds, a surgical ward, office, kitchen and dining room. The stable was re-modeled into treatment rooms and a nurse's dormitory and in 1896, the Belknaps moved from the area and the Seventh-day Adventist (SDA) church obtained the facility. The church added a two-year nurses training program and formed a health food company in 1897.

In 1902, the need for expansion relocated the sanitarium to the base of Mt. Tabor. There a four-story wood building provided for 75 patients and was easily accessible from the train station a few blocks away. William Holden, M.D., joined the staff in 1903 and soon took the position of medical director, which he would hold till his death in 1955. It was under his direction that the hospital transitioned from a long-term care facility to a surgical/medical facility.

During the 1950s and 1960s new additions were made including training programs in medical technology, radiological technology, practical nursing and a pediatrics department. In the mid-1960s it was determined that expansion and relocation was again necessary. A lack of funds prompted the hospital board to turn to the public for support. The $2.5 million expansion also received aid from federal grants and the Seventh-day Adventist church. Administrators purchased the 232-acre (0.94 km^{2}) Glendover Golf Course planning to reserve 46 acres (190,000 m^{2}) for the hospital and redesigning the remaining land into a 27-hole championship golf course and driving range. Controversy over this plan arose resulting in the county purchasing the land back from the hospital and a new site was purchased on SE Market Street.

== Awards and recognitions ==
The hospital received a grade B from The Leapfrog Group from spring 2012 to spring 2013, and it received a grade A from fall 2013 to spring 2015.
