= KPLL-LP =

Satellite of KGTS/Walla Walla, Washington
- Lewiston, Idaho; United States
- Frequency: 94.9 MHz
- Branding: Positive Life Radio

Programming
- Format: Christian

Ownership
- Owner: Lewiston Christian Radio Association

History
- Call sign meaning: Positive Life Lewiston

Technical information
- Licensing authority: FCC
- Facility ID: 132474
- Class: L1
- ERP: 100 watts
- HAAT: -91.7 meters
- Transmitter coordinates: 46°26′20″N 117°0′31″W

Links
- Public license information: LMS

KPLL-LP (94.9 FM) is a radio station licensed to Lewiston, Idaho, United States. The station is an affiliate of the Positive Life Radio network. The station is currently owned by Lewiston Christian Radio Association.
