= Walla Walla Valley Academy =

Location
- 300 SW Academy Way; College Place, Washington 99324; United States; 46°02′47″N 118°24′00″W

Information
- Type: Private
- Motto: Empowering Students for Christ
- Religious affiliation: Seventh-day Adventist Church
- Established: 1886
- Oversight: Seventh-day Adventist education
- Principal: Scott Rae
- Grades: 9–12
- Enrollment: 169 (2016)
- Colors: Maroon, black, white, gray.
- Mascot: The Knight
- Accreditation: Adventist Accrediting Association
- Website: www.wwva.org

Walla Walla Valley Academy (WWVA) is a private Seventh-day Adventist high school located in College Place, Washington. College Place is next to the larger town of Walla Walla and is in the Walla Walla Valley. The academy is a part of the Seventh-day Adventist education system, the world's second largest Christian school system. The school traces its origins to 1886 and is one of the oldest continuously operating Adventist secondary schools in the Pacific Northwest.

== History ==
The institution originated in 1886 as Milton Academy, serving Adventist families in the Walla Walla Valley region. In 1892, the school became associated with the educational network surrounding Walla Walla College and adopted the name Walla Walla College Academy. The academy moved to its present campus in College Place in 1964 and subsequently adopted the name Walla Walla Valley Academy.

In 2023, WWVA joined with Rogers Adventist School (a pre-K–8 campus) to form a unified K–12 educational structure named Walla Walla Valley Adventist Schools (VAS). The merger was approved by both institutions’ boards and their constituent churches, consolidating operations while retaining separate campuses for elementary and high school grades.

== Campus ==
Walla Walla Valley Academy is located at 300 SW Academy Way, College Place, Washington, adjacent to the campus of Walla Walla University. The facility includes general academic buildings, science laboratories, visual and performing arts spaces, a gymnasium, and outdoor athletic areas.

== Academics ==
WWVA offers a college-preparatory curriculum including English, mathematics, sciences, religion, social studies, world languages, visual arts, applied technology, and business courses. Religious instruction is integrated throughout the program in accordance with Seventh-day Adventist education guidelines.

Recent enrollment estimates place WWVA’s student body at approximately 160–170 students, with a student–teacher ratio of about 13:1. A majority of graduates matriculate to four-year colleges and universities, consistent with long-term trends within Adventist secondary education.

== Student Life and Extracurricular Activities ==
The school sponsors extracurricular programs including music ensembles, drama, leadership organizations, and community service opportunities. Athletic offerings include basketball, volleyball, soccer, and other interscholastic sports, emphasizing teamwork and Christian character development.

== Affiliation ==
Walla Walla Valley Academy operates within the Seventh-day Adventist education system, one of the largest Protestant school networks worldwide. The school receives support from local Adventist churches and is administered under the regional conference structure governing Adventist education in the Pacific Northwest.

== Walla Walla Valley Adventist Schools (VAS) ==
In 2023, WWVA and Rogers Adventist School were reorganized under Walla Walla Valley Adventist Schools, a unified K–12 administrative system designed to streamline governance, financial management, and mission alignment. Both schools retain their names and continue operating on separate campuses but function as a single educational organization.

== Community Role ==
WWVA has played a longstanding role within the Walla Walla Valley community, educating multiple generations of local families since the late 19th century. Its continuity, and regional ties make it a significant institution within local private education.

== See also ==
- List of Seventh-day Adventist secondary schools
- Seventh-day Adventist education
- College Place, Washington
