= W. W. Prescott =

American educator and theologian (1855–1944)

- Prescott in 1892

President of Union College
- In office 1924–1925
- Preceded by: Otto Marion John
- Succeeded by: Leo Thiel
- In office 1891–1893
- Preceded by: Position established
- Succeeded by: J. W. Loughead

President of Australasian Missionary College
- In office 1922–1922
- Preceded by: Henry Kirk
- Succeeded by: L. H. Wood

President of Walla Walla College
- In office 1892–1894
- Preceded by: Position established
- Succeeded by: Edward Alexander Sutherland

President of Battle Creek College
- In office 1885–1894
- Preceded by: Wolcott Hackley Littlejohn
- Succeeded by: George Washington Caviness

Personal details
- Born: William Warren Prescott; September 2, 1855 Alton, New Hampshire, United States
- Died: January 21, 1944 (aged 88) Takoma Park, Maryland, United States
- Resting place: Rock Creek Cemetery
- Spouse(s): Sarah Sanders (m. 1880); Daisy Orndorff (m. 1911)
- Education: Dartmouth College

William Warren Prescott (1855–1944) was an administrator, educator, and scholar in the early Seventh-day Adventist Church.

== Biography ==
Prescott's parents were part of the Millerite movement.

W. W. Prescott graduated from Dartmouth College in 1877 and served as principal of high schools in Vermont, and published and edited newspapers in Maine and Vermont prior to accepting the presidency of Battle Creek College (1885 to 1894). While still president of Battle Creek College he helped found Union College and became its first president in 1891. In 1892 he assumed the presidency of the newly founded Walla Walla College in Washington. Five years later, he helped found Australasian Mission College (now Avondale College) in Australia.

He was invited to tour many regions of the world (1894–1895) to hold Bible institutes and to strengthen developing educational interests. Back in the USA in 1901, he became vice-president of the General Conference of the Seventh-day Adventist church, chairman of the Review and Herald Publishing Association board (a Seventh-day Adventist church operated publishing house), and editor of the Review and Herald (a Seventh-day Adventist church religious magazine). On relinquishing this editorship in 1909, he edited the Protestant Magazine for seven years.

He was a field secretary of the General Conference from 1915 until his retirement in 1937, serving during this time as principal of the Australasian Missionary College (1922), and as head of the Bible department at Union College (1924–1928). He spent the year 1930 visiting the churches and institutions in Europe. On his return he wrote The Spade and the Bible, and then became head of the Bible department of Emmanuel Missionary College, a post he held until 1934.

== Publications ==
- Christ and the Sabbath (International Religious Liberty Association, 1893)
- The Doctrine of Christ: a series of Bible studies for use in colleges and seminaries (Review & Herald, 1920)
- The Saviour of the World (Review & Herald, 1929)
- The Spade and the Bible: Archaeological Discoveries Confirm the Old Book (Fleming H. Revell, 1933)
- Victory in Christ (Review & Herald, not dated)

== See also ==
- Seventh-day Adventist Church
- Seventh-day Adventist theology
- Seventh-day Adventist eschatology
- History of the Seventh-day Adventist Church
- Teachings of Ellen White
- Inspiration of Ellen White
- Prophecy in the Seventh-day Adventist Church
- Investigative judgment
- The Pillars of Adventism
- Second Advent
- Baptism by Immersion
- Conditional Immortality
- Historicism
- Three Angels' Messages
- End times
- Sabbath in Seventh-day Adventism
- Ellen G. White
- Adventist Review
- Adventist
- Seventh-day Adventist Church Pioneers
- Seventh-day Adventist worship
