= Marlfield House =

19th Century Irish country house

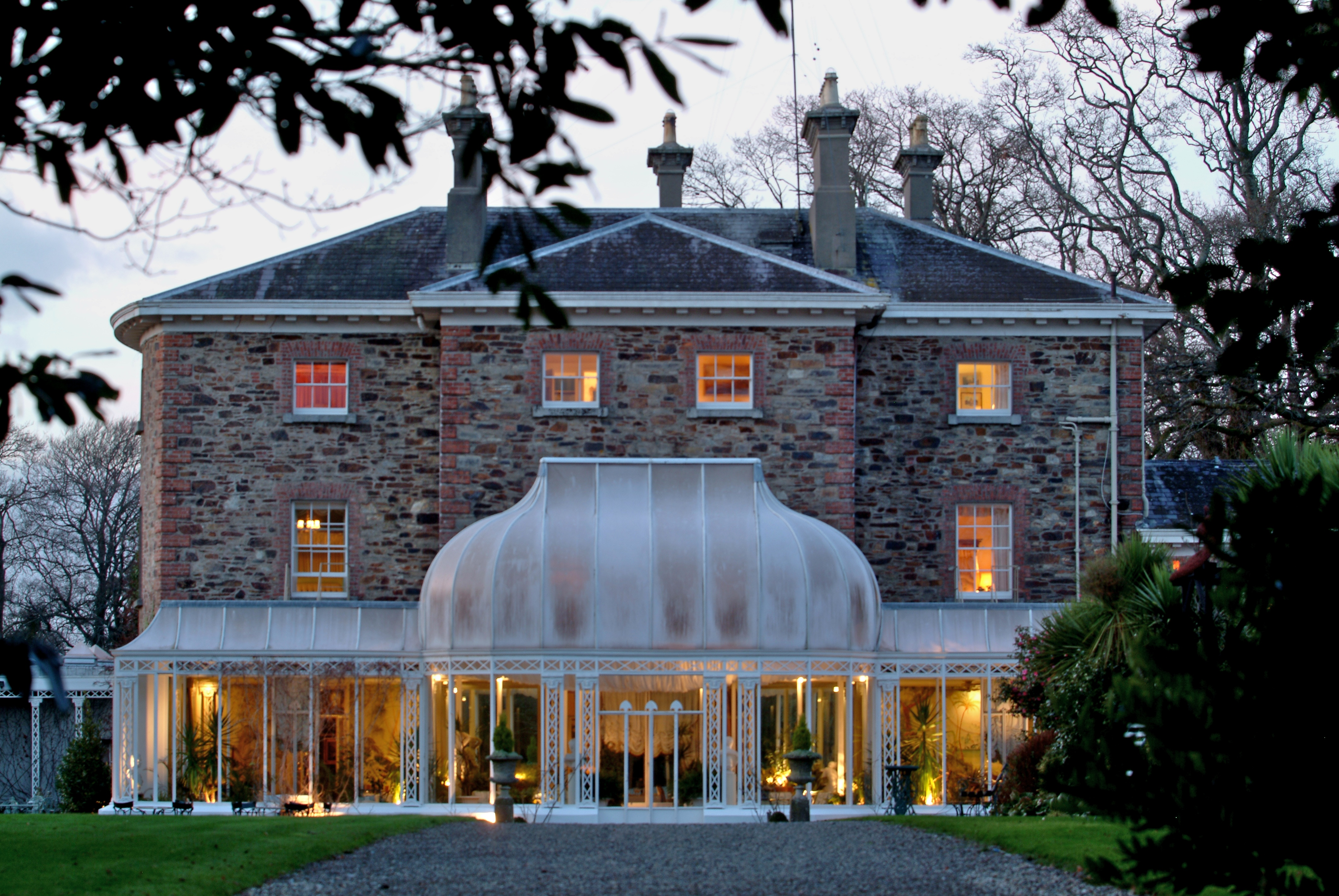

- Location within Ireland

General information
- Location: Gorey, County Wexford, Ireland
- Coordinates: 52.66875°N 6.27524°W
- Completed: 1852

Marlfield House, County Wexford is an Irish country house built in 1852 and was one of the two houses owned by the Earls of Courtown. An example of a rural regency style house, it was a dower house on the Courtown House Estate. It is now a hotel.

== History ==
Owning two residences was not uncommon for wealthy families during the 19th century, and the Stopfords (the family name of the Earls of Courtown) were no exception. Guests regularly came to stay at both Marlfield and Courtown House, the principal family home, located about three miles from Marlfield. The Stopford family was ultimately unable to support their lavish lifestyle and Courtown House no longer exists. Marlfield House was further improved in 1866 by James Thomas Stopford (1794-1858), fourth Earl of Courtown. The house has historic connections with James Walter Milles Stopford (1853-1933), sixth Earl of Courtown, Major James Richard Neville Stopford OBE (1877-1857), seventh Earl of Courtown, and James Montagu Burgoyne Stopford (1908-1975), eighth Earl of Courtown.

Marlfield House was purchased from the Earls of Courtown by Mary and Ray Bowe in 1977 and following extensive restoration involving the introduction of six state rooms was opened as a hotel in 1978.

== Architecture ==
Marlfield House was built in 1852 and modified in 1866 and is an important part of the 19th-century heritage of the area around Gorey. It is a medium-sized house with a T-shaped floor plan. The two sides are bowed and three stories high; the garden front is four stories with a breakfront. The walls are rubble-stone on a cut-granite base, with red brick quoins at the corners. The interior retains timber door surrounds and doors, fine plasterwork, and classical-style chimneypieces, some in white marble.
