= Jon Dybdahl =

American theologian (1942–2023

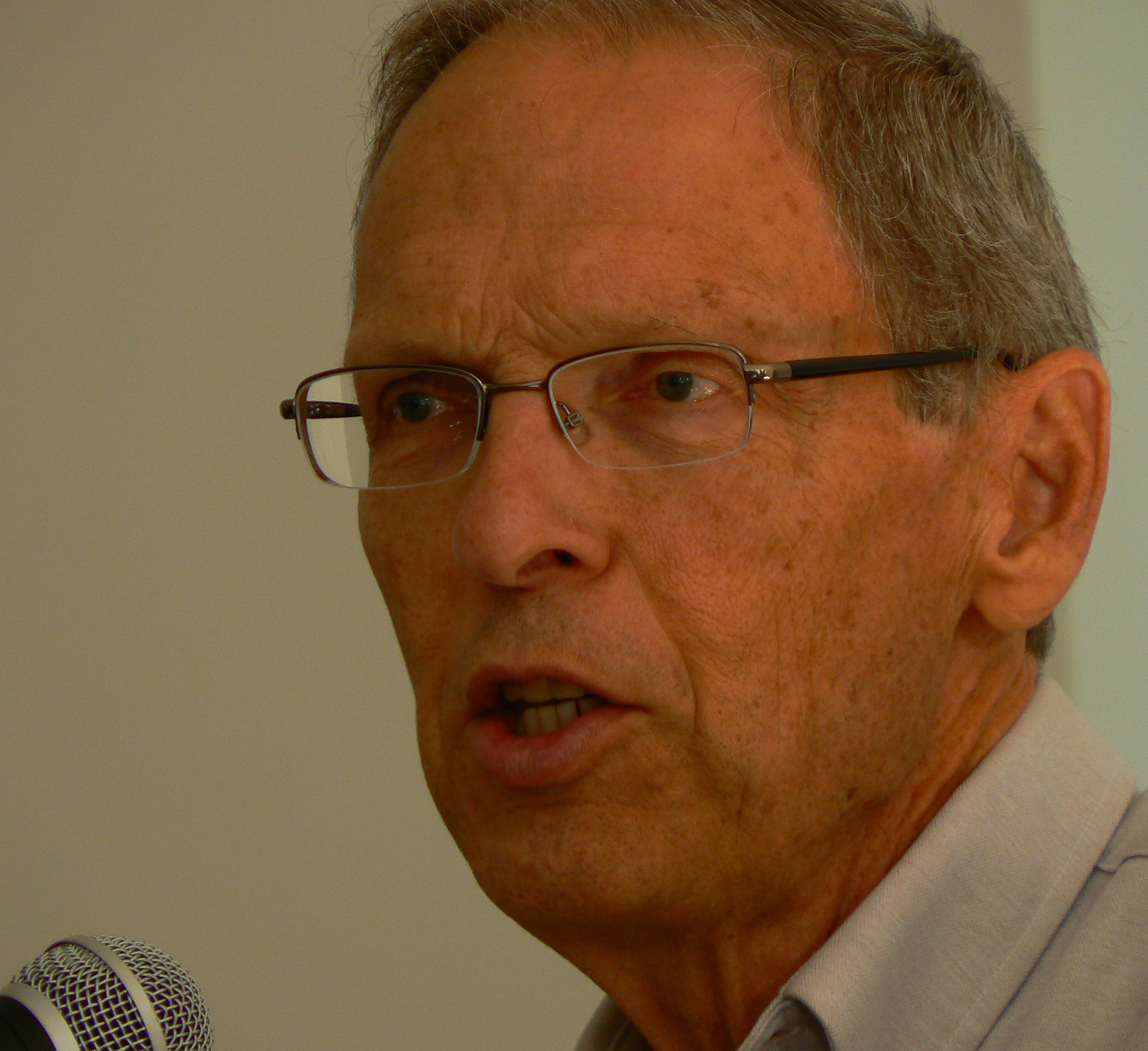
Prof. Jon Dybdahl lecturing in Adventist Theological Seminary in Sázava (October 2011)

Jon Lee Dybdahl (December 17, 1942 – January 18, 2023) was a professor of theology and a college administrator who served as president of Walla Walla University from 2002 until 2006.

Prior to his presidency, Dybdahl spent six years as a pastor and evangelist in Thailand, where he founded an adult education center and Chiangmai Adventist Academy. Dybdahl had degrees in theology from Pacific Union College, Andrews University and Fuller Theological Seminary. Dybdahl was considered one of the Seventh-day Adventist church's foremost experts on world mission.

== Personal life ==
Dybdahl died at the age of 80 on January 18, 2023.

== Books ==
- Missions: A Two-Way Street (1986)
- Old Testament Grace (1989)
- Exodus: God Creates a People (The Abundant Life Amplifier series) (1995)
- Hosea-Micah: A Call to Radical Reform (The Abundant Life Amplifier series) (1996)
- Passport to Mission (1999) [co-authored with Erich Baumgartner, Pat Gustin, and Bruce Moyer, on behalf of the Institute of World Mission
- Adventist Mission in the 21st Century (1999)
- A Strange Place for Grace: Discovering a Loving God in the Old Testament (2006)
- Hunger: Satisfying the Longing of Your Soul

| Preceded by Roy Branson | President of the Adventist Society for Religious Studies; 1996 | Succeeded by John Brunt |
