= Martin Field (Washington) =

Coordinates: 46°02′49″N 118°25′02″W

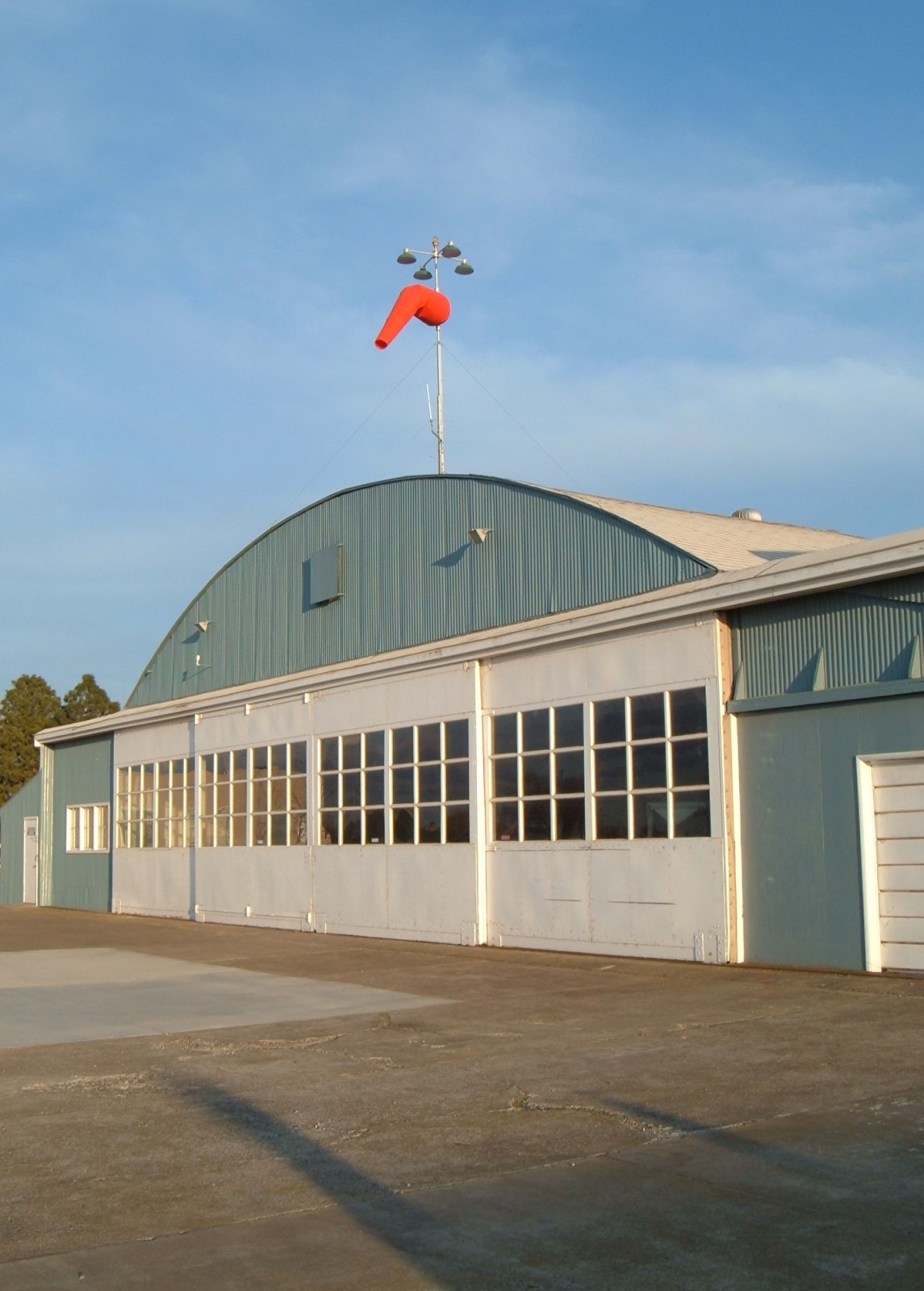
- Hangar at Martin Field
- IATA: none; ICAO: none; FAA LID: S95

Summary
- Airport type: Public
- Owner: Tarragon NW
- Serves: College Place, Washington
- Elevation AMSL: 746 ft / 227 m
- Interactive map of Martin Field

Runways
Direction	Length		Surface
Direction	ft	m	Surface
5/23	3,819	1,164	Asphalt

Statistics (2007)
- Aircraft operations: 5,000
- Based aircraft: 53
- Source: Federal Aviation Administration

Martin Field (FAA LID: S95) is a privately owned, public-use airport located one mile (2 km) west of the central business district of College Place, a city in Walla Walla County, Washington, United States. The airport was founded in the early 1940s by Herman L. Martin. During World War II, it served as a training ground for approximately 2500 United States Navy aviators.

== Facilities and aircraft ==
Martin Field covers an area of 170 acres (69 ha) which contains one runway (5/23) with a 3,819 x 60 ft (1,164 x 18 m) asphalt pavement. For the 12-month period ending June 30, 2007, the airport had 5,000 general aviation aircraft operations, an average of 13 per day. At that time there were 53 aircraft based at this airport: 87% single-engine, 2% multi-engine and 11% ultralight.

== See also ==
- List of airports in Washington
