= Walla Walla University =

Adventist university in College Place, Washington, US

Coordinates: 46°02′48″N 118°23′26″W

- Former name: Walla Walla College (1892–2007)
- Type: Private university
- Established: 1892; 134 years ago
- Religious affiliation: Seventh-day Adventist Church
- Academic affiliations: NAICU; CCCU (affiliate)
- Endowment: $51.2 million (2025)
- President: Alex Bryan
- Faculty: 171
- Students: 1,855
- Undergraduates: 1,655
- Location: College Place, Washington, U.S.
- Campus: Suburban
- Colors: Forest Green & Orange
- Nickname: Wolves
- Sporting affiliations: NAIA – CCC
- Website: wallawalla.edu

Walla Walla University is a private Adventist university in College Place, Washington. The university has five campuses throughout the Pacific Northwest. It was founded in 1892 and is affiliated with the Seventh-day Adventist Church.

The university has an annual enrollment of around 1,700 students. It is accredited by the Northwest Commission on Colleges and Universities and is also denominationally accredited. Walla Walla University offers more than 100 areas of study including preprofessional degrees and four graduate programs.

== History ==
In 1887, W.W. Prescott became the first education secretary of the General Conference of Seventh-day Adventists. He noticed that Seventh-day Adventist schools were opening all over the place without a plan for long-term success, and decided to encourage these new Adventist schools to consolidate into larger, regional institutions that would stand a better chance of survival. In 1890, Prescott visited the Pacific Northwest and asked the three Adventist schools there to merge; and after overcoming local opposition, the Adventist schools in Coquille, Portland, and Milton, all in Oregon, agreed to merge. A committee chose to place the new school on forty acres of land located just west of Walla Walla, Washington that were donated for the school. The new school opened on December 7, 1892, named Walla Walla College, and Prescott was named the first president. However, Prescott was also president of two other institutions at the time, so Edward A. Sutherland, the principal, took over running the school's day-to-day activities and eventually became the second president of the college.

On the first day, Walla Walla College offered all education from elementary up to the first two years of college; total enrollment was 101, with six teachers. All classes were run out of the four-storey tall administration building, deliberately built tall so that it could be seen from the city of Walla Walla. Sutherland focused on following the counsels of Adventist prophetess Ellen G. White as closely as possible, and under his direction the school became the first to offer an exclusively vegetarian diet. Likewise, he emphasized manual labour for the students. Initially school finances were shaky, but the manual labour of the students eventually provided sufficient income to stabilize the school's finances. The school's first graduation was held in 1896; three students graduated.

The school quickly celebrated a number of important milestones. In 1895, the school became the first Adventist institution to allow a brass ensemble to play during church services. In 1899, the first college bakery opened. In 1901, Walla Walla College was incorporated. In 1905, Marion E. Cady became the school's eighth president, and under his leadership the school expanded its college course offerings to a full four-year college program; by 1909, the college celebrated its first baccalaureate graduate. Cady also stabilized the school's finances, which resulted in the college paying off its debt in 1909. However, in 1910 the school suffered the first of many fires, when the power plant burned down. In 1911, Ernest Kellogg took over as president, and under his leadership the academic program of the college was further strengthened; elementary and high school classes were moved to separate buildings, and the school received accreditation from the University of Washington in 1913 for its high school; in that same year, enrollment reached 400 students. Kellogg designed the school's seal, and under Kellogg, the first yearbook was published, the first student newspaper was published, the student association was founded, and the alumni association was created. The first school gym opened when Kellogg retired in 1917; the current cafeteria building is named after him.

In 1919, a fire destroyed the top floor of the school's administration building. In the 1920s, Walla Walla College pursued accreditation for its college program, receiving accreditation for the first two years of its college program and also winning accreditation for its teacher training program. However, the college met opposition from the church over its pursuit of accreditation, and suspended its application. During this time period, OPS and AGA (dorm clubs) were founded, the Johnson Music Conservatory was built, and a fire burned down the women's dorm. In the 1930s, Walla Walla College again pursued accreditation, and by 1935 it received accreditation for its full college program; in this same year, the high school separated from the college and became Walla Walla Valley Academy, leaving the school strictly a college. By this time, Walla Walla College was the largest Seventh-day Adventist college in the world. Walla Walla went through further conflicts with Adventist authorities, which reached an apex in 1938, when several theology professors were fired because they were considered heterodox. President William Martin Landeen resigned.

In 1939, the Columbia Auditorium opened, a popular performing arts venue. In the 1940s, a number of important developments helped found some of Walla Walla's most popular programs. An airfield was built in 1942 which led to the start of Walla Walla's aviation program. In 1944, the present library building was completed, and in 1947 the present boys dorm was built. In 1945, the village that had grown up to support the college was incorporated as the city of College Place, Washington. In 1947, the university opened up the first school of engineering in the Seventh-day Adventist church, and the first physical education program started around the same time. Also in 1947, the school opened its first satellite campus, when it began its school of nursing at the Portland Sanitarium, today Adventist Health Portland. In 1948, the college's first master's program was offered in Biology, and a master's degree in Education began two years later. A second satellite campus was opened in 1954 at Rosario Beach in Anacortes, Washington, for the marine biology program. Enrollment more than doubled in the post-war years, reaching 1,300 by 1950.

Growth slowed in the 1960s. A church was built in 1962, the present-day University Church. The college radio station, KGTS, began broadcasting in 1963, as the first FM-radio station in the Walla Walla Valley. Several buildings were built towards the end of the decade. The college also began to liberalize its rules, allowing its female students more freedom in how they dressed, and also hired its first full-time black professor. In 1971, the university's engineering school was granted accreditation.

In the 1970s, the college ran into financial difficulties; a number of college industries were closed, sold, or privatized. A fire damaged the women's dorm, and in 1978 a fire destroyed the Columbia Auditorium. Enrollment reached 2,000 by the middle of the decade. In the 1980s, WWC established an endowment fund in 1987. Also in 1987, a graduate program in social work began.

In 2007, the school was renamed Walla Walla University. Today enrollment fluctuates just under 2,000 students who are served by over 200 faculty and staff, across the university's five campuses.

=== Presidents ===
Past presidents of Walla Walla University:

- William Prescott (1892–1894)
- Edward A. Sutherland (1894–1897)
- Emmett J. Hibbard (1897–1898)
- Walter R. Sutherland (1898–1900)
- Edwin L. Stewart (1900–1902)
- Charles C. Lewis (1902–1904)
- Joseph L. Kay (1904–1905)
- Marion E. Cady (1905–1911)
- Ernest C. Kellogg (1911–1917)
- Walter I. Smith (1917–1930)
- John E. Weaver (1930–1933)
- William M. Landeen (1933–1938)
- George W. Bowers (1938–1955)
- Percy W. Christian (1955–1964)
- William H. Shephard (1964–1968)
- Robert L. Reynolds (1968–1976)
- N. Clifford Sorenson (1976–1985)
- H. J. Bergman (1985–1990)
- Niels-Erik Andreasen (1990–1994)
- W. G. Nelson (1994–2001)
- John C. Brunt (2001)
- N. Clifford Sorenson (2001–2002)
- Jon L. Dybdahl (2002–2006)
- John K. McVay (2006–2012)
- Steve Rose (2012)
- John K. McVay (2013–2024)
- Alex Bryan (2024-present)

== Academics ==
Walla Walla University is accredited by the Northwest Commission on Colleges and Universities, and also by the Adventist Accrediting Association. Some of WWU's schools and departments are also accredited by agencies specific to their field. WWU has authorization from both the state of Washington and the state of Oregon.

WWU offers pre-professional programs, Associate degrees, Bachelor's degrees, and Master's degrees. The largest undergraduate programs are the nursing, engineering, business, biology, and education schools.

Walla Walla University is administratively divided into six schools and several departments: Business, Education and Psychology, Engineering, Nursing, Social Work, and Theology.

=== Other programs ===
Walla Walla University's Department of Biological Sciences is one of its most popular programs. It operates the Rosario Beach Marine Campus. It is the university's oldest master's degree program.

== Campuses ==
Walla Walla University has five campuses. They are located in Washington, Oregon, and Montana.

=== College Place Main Campus ===
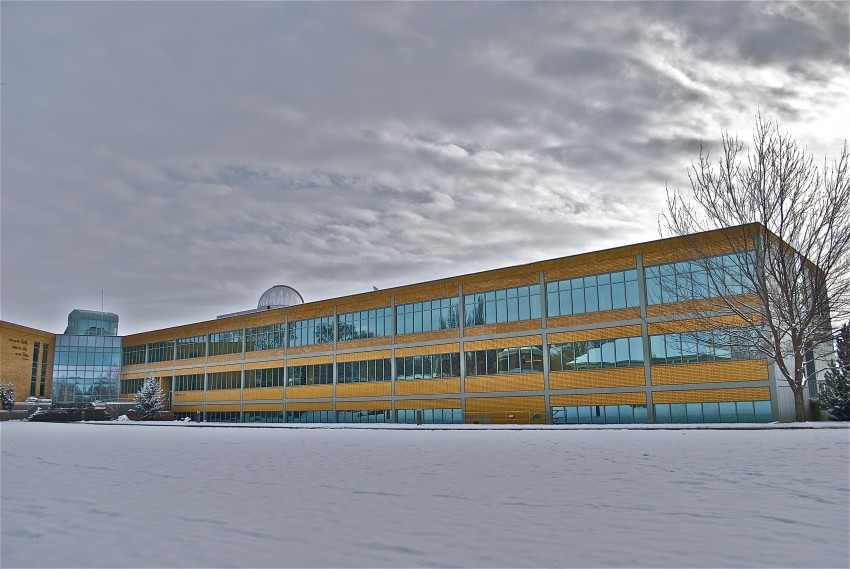
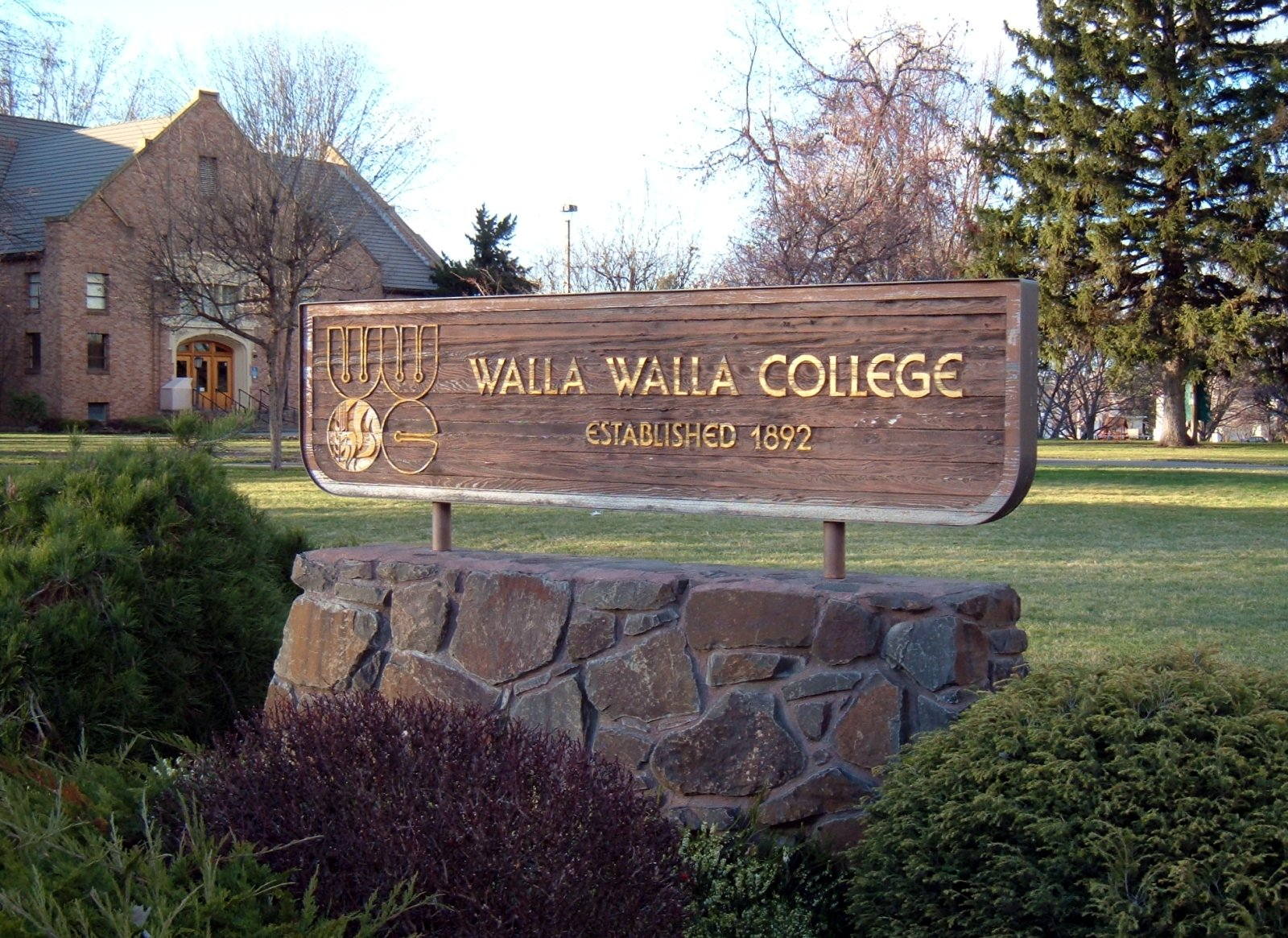
(Left): Kretchmar Building; (right): WWU sign

The first campus of Walla Walla University remains its central campus. Located outside of Walla Walla, Washington, the campus was initially 40 acres before being expanded to the present-day 83 acres, in addition to 592 total acres in the local area. The city of College Place, Washington sprung up shortly after the founding of the campus in 1892 to support the students and workers of the university. Nearly the entire undergraduate program of Walla Walla University is located on this campus, and the graduate program in education is also located on this campus. The oldest building on campus is Village Hall, built in 1920 as the university church. The campus includes Martin Airfield, opened in 1942 for the aviation department.

=== Portland nursing campus ===
The School of Nursing operates a campus in Portland, Oregon adjacent to Adventist Health Portland, where third and fourth-year nursing students complete their practicum. Opened in 1947, the campus includes a small dormitory for nursing students, named Hansen Hall.

=== Rosario Beach Marine Laboratory ===
The department of Biology operates a 40-acre campus on Rosario Beach, next to Anacortes, Washington. The campus operates during the summer, offering courses in biology and marine biology. The campus also supports courses in scuba diving. The campus was purchased in 1954.

=== Montana campuses ===
The school of social work and sociology operates two campuses in Montana, at Missoula and Billings, in support of its graduate program in social work. The Missoula campus opened in 1997, and the Billings campus opened in 2001.

== Student government ==
The Associated Students of Walla Walla University (ASWWU) was founded in 1914 as the Collegiate Association. They have published the school yearbook, Mountain Ash, beginning in 1915 as the Western Collegian, and since 1917 under its current title. They have published the school newspaper, The Collegian, published under that title since 1916. ASWWU has also published the school directory, The Mask, since 1954.

== Athletics ==
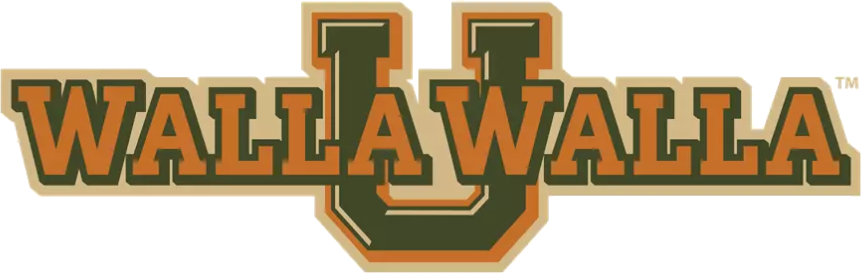
WWU athletics wordmark

The Walla Walla athletic teams are called the Wolves. The university is a member of the National Association of Intercollegiate Athletics (NAIA), primarily competing in the Cascade Collegiate Conference (CCC) since the 2015–16 academic year. The Wolves previously competed as an NAIA Independent within the Association of Independent Institutions (AII) from 2008–09 to 2014–15, and in the Pacific Northwest College Conference (PNCC) from 1994–95 to 1999–2000. They also were a member in the United States Collegiate Athletic Association (USCAA) from 2004–05 to 2012–13; and in the National Christian College Athletic Association (NCCAA) from 1997–98 to 2007–08.

Walla Walla competes in eight intercollegiate varsity sports: Men's sports include basketball, cross country, golf and soccer; while women's sports include basketball, cross country, golf and volleyball.

=== Club sports ===
Unofficially, Walla Walla was affiliated with a men's ice hockey team, called the Wolfpack.

== Campus Ministries ==
The Chaplain's Office of the university includes departments of Campus Ministries and Student Missions.

=== Student Missions ===
The modern Walla Walla University Student Missions program began in 1960 when they sent out their first student missionaries overseas. Today, Walla Walla University sends out between 50 and 90 student missionaries (SMs) each year, to locations around the world. Some Seventh-day Adventist schools in Micronesia are staffed by Walla Walla University student missionaries.

== Notable people ==
Alumni of WWU include business people such as Jeri Ellsworth, Peter Adkison and Forrest Preston, ornithologist Pamela C. Rasmussen, ophthalmologist and Order of Canada recipient Howard Gimbel, theologian Alden Thompson, and former lieutenant governor of Guam Michael Cruz.

== See also ==
- KGTS
- List of Seventh-day Adventist colleges and universities
- Seventh-day Adventist education
