= Michelle Hartman (poet) =

American author and poet (born 1956)

Michelle Hartman is an American author and poet. Born in Fort Worth in 1956, she attended Texas Wesleyan College (now Texas Wesleyan University) in the early 1970s. Her major was Political Science until she dropped out of school. She finished her bachelor's degree in 2007, with a major in Political Science Pre-Law. After receiving a Certificate in Paralegal Studies from Tarrant County College, she worked as a paralegal. She began writing poetry of political and social satire using fairy tales as a vehicle. Her first book, Disenchanted and Disgruntled, was published by Lamar University Literary Press in 2013.

Her work has been featured in The Galway Review and The Langdon Review of the Arts in Texas published by Tarleton State University. Her work has also appeared in journals in Australia, Ireland, Canada, Germany, Sweden and Nepal.

Hartman is the former editor (2010-2018) of the international journal Red River Review. She has read at Southwest literary festivals such as Scissortail Literary Festival in Oklahoma, Langdon Review Weekend and the ASU Writers Conference in Honor of Elmer Kelton, among others.

== Bibliography ==
- Disenchanted and Disgruntled, Lamar University Press, 2013
- Irony and Irreverence, Lamar University Press, 2015
- The Lost Journal of My Second Trip to Purgatory, Old Seventy Creek Press, 2016
- There Are No Doors, El Grito del Lobo Press, (Chapbook) 2017
- Wanton Disarray, Hungry Buzzard Press, 2019
- First Night, Red Flag Press, 2019
- Here Be Doors, Dancing Girl Press, 2019

== Honors and awards ==
- Named Distinguished Alumni by Tarrant County College
- Two Pushcart Nominations (Canada and US)
- Juried Poet - Houston Poetry Fest Competition
- Phi Theta Kappa, National Honor Society
- Pi Gamma Mu, International Honor Society of the Social Sciences
- Pi Sigma Alpha, National Political Science Honor Society
- 2004 – Dannon “Strike Out Hunger” Award
