= College Place, Washington =

- City
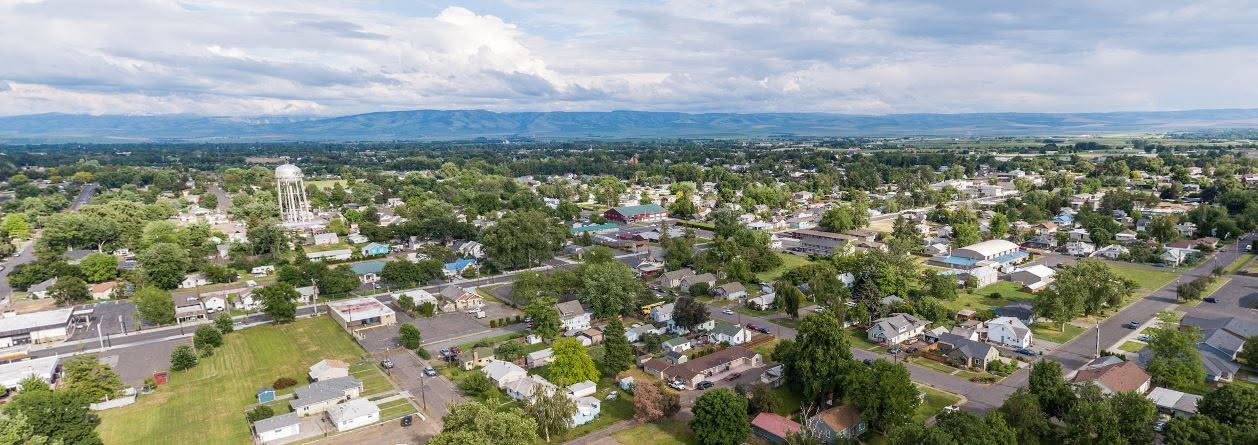
- City of College Place from Walla Walla University Looking Southeast (2022)

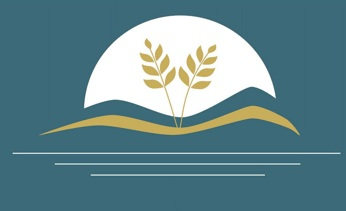
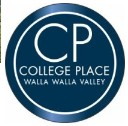
- Flag Seal

- Location of College Place, Washington
- Coordinates: 46°02′35″N 118°22′57″W
- Country: United States
- State: Washington
- County: Walla Walla

Government
  - Type: Mayor–council
  - Mayor: Norma Hernandez
  - City Administrator: Robert McAndrews

Area
  - Total: 3.00 sq mi (7.76 km^{2})
  - Land: 3.00 sq mi (7.76 km^{2})
  - Water: 0 sq mi (0.00 km^{2})
- Elevation: 781 ft (238 m)

Population (2020)
  - Total: 9,902
  - Density: 3,109.1/sq mi (1,200.42/km^{2})
- Time zone: UTC-8 (Pacific (PST))
  - Summer (DST): UTC-7 (PDT)
- ZIP code: 99324
- Area code: 509
- FIPS code: 53-13855
- GNIS feature ID: 2410192
- Website: cpwa.us

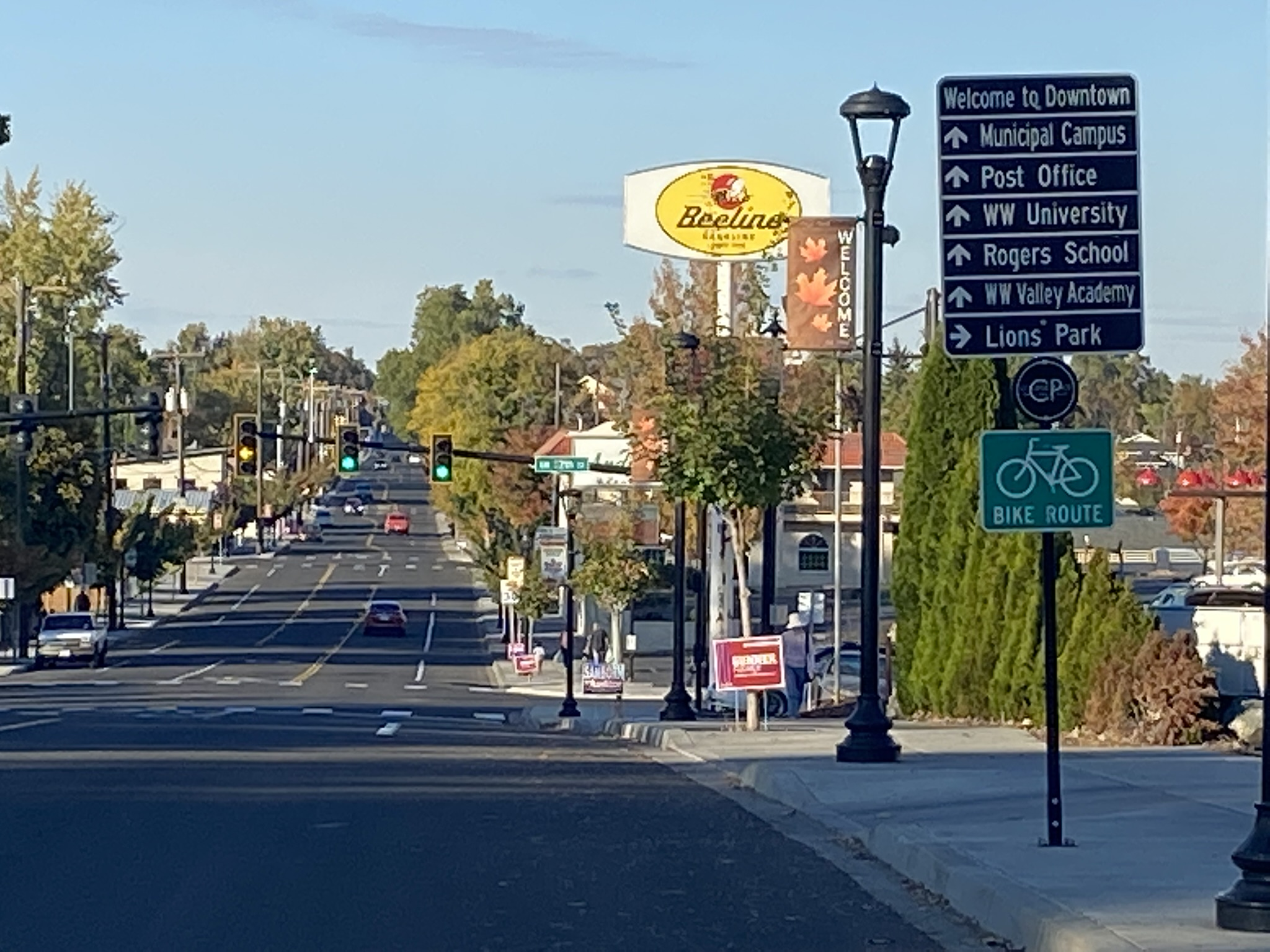
Downtown College Place (College & 12th)

College Place is a city in Walla Walla County, Washington, United States. It neighbors the larger city of Walla Walla, and had a population of 10,090 per Washington State Office of Financial Management (OFM) population estimates.

College Place is the home of Walla Walla University (formerly Walla Walla College, thus the city's name), a Seventh-day Adventist Church operated liberal arts university.

The City has a quaint downtown primarily centered along College Avenue from Rose Street to 13th Street. It is anchored by small businesses such as Happy Wanderer, Andy's Market, Enable Art, and Rogers Bakery. Many businesses downtown are owned by Seventh-Day Adventist owners so they close two hours before sunset on Fridays and then reopen at sunset on Saturday evenings. Downtown has seen significant reinvestment after College Avenue/Rose Street (CARS) Project fully reconstructed the corridor between 2015 and 2017. Economic Development in the corridor is shepherded by the Downtown College Place Association as well as the Cowalla (College Place - Walla Walla) Creative District. Both cities were recognized as a State of Washington Creative District in 2025.

Big box retailers in the city are primarily centered along State Route 125 and Myra Rd. The City in recent years has made significant reinvestment into its park system with Kiwanis Park being rehabbed with pickleball courts in 2017, Veterans Park donated to the City from Hayden Homes out at Homestead in 2019, Korean War Memorial at Veterans Park in 2024, and then the massive Lions Park reconstruction of 2024-2025.

== History ==
Martin Field, to the west of town, was an air training base during World War II. It is now a private airfield.

College Place was officially incorporated on January 19, 1946.

Partial Directory of Mayors

- Norma Hernandez: September 2019 to Present
- Mayor Pro Tem Marge Nyhagen: August 2019
- Harvey Crowder: June 2016 to August 2019
- Julie Scott: June 2014 to June 2016
- Rick Newby: 2008 to June 2014 (died in office)
- Ed Ammon: 2000 to 2008
- Fred Spruell: 1997 to 2000
- Thor Bakland: 1994 to 1997

Partial Directory of City Administrators

- Robert McAndrews: September 2026 to Present
- Troy Rayburn: October 2025 to July 2026
- Interim - Michael Matthais: June to July 2025
- Mike Rizzitiello: November 2016 to June 2025
- Interim - Mike Jackson: July 2016 to October 2016
- Pat Reay: August 2004 to July 2016
- Mike Patterson: July 2000 to September 2004

== Geography ==
According to the United States Census Bureau, the city has a total area of 2.66 square miles (6.89 km^{2}), all of it land.

=== Climate ===
According to the Köppen Climate Classification system, College Place has a warm-summer Mediterranean climate, abbreviated "Csa" on climate maps.

== Demographics ==
Historical population
Census	Pop.	Note	%±
1940	1,272		—
1950	3,174		149.5%
1960	4,031		27.0%
1970	4,510		11.9%
1980	5,771		28.0%
1990	6,308		9.3%
2000	7,818		23.9%
2010	8,765		12.1%
2020	9,902		13.0%
U.S. Decennial Census

=== 2020 census ===
As of the 2020 census, College Place had a population of 9,902. The median age was 35.0 years. 18.8% of residents were under the age of 18 and 20.1% of residents were 65 years of age or older. For every 100 females there were 93.4 males, and for every 100 females age 18 and over there were 91.7 males age 18 and over.

99.9% of residents lived in urban areas, while 0.1% lived in rural areas.

There were 3,748 households in College Place, of which 27.2% had children under the age of 18 living in them. Of all households, 42.8% were married-couple households, 18.6% were households with a male householder and no spouse or partner present, and 32.6% were households with a female householder and no spouse or partner present. About 33.0% of all households were made up of individuals and 15.7% had someone living alone who was 65 years of age or older.

There were 4,176 housing units, of which 10.2% were vacant. The homeowner vacancy rate was 2.2% and the rental vacancy rate was 8.6%.

Racial composition as of the 2020 census
Race	Number	Percent
White	7,177	72.5%
Black or African American	173	1.7%
American Indian and Alaska Native	77	0.8%
Asian	183	1.8%
Native Hawaiian and Other Pacific Islander	51	0.5%
Some other race	1,059	10.7%
Two or more races	1,182	11.9%
Hispanic or Latino (of any race)	2,120	21.4%

=== 2010 census ===
At the 2010 census there were 8,765 people in 3,523 households, including 2,096 families, in the city. The population density was 3,295.1 inhabitants per square mile (1,272.2/km^{2}). There were 3,764 housing units at an average density of 1,415.0 per square mile (546.3/km^{2}). The racial makeup of the city was 85.7% White, 1.6% African American, 0.7% Native American, 1.9% Asian, 0.3% Pacific Islander, 6.8% from other races, and 3.1% from two or more races. Hispanic or Latino of any race were 18.5%.

Of the 3,523 households 24.9% had children under the age of 18 living with them, 44.4% were married couples living together, 11.0% had a female householder with no husband present, 4.1% had a male householder with no wife present, and 40.5% were non-families. 32.0% of households were one person and 13.2% were one person aged 65 or older. The average household size was 2.26 and the average family size was 2.85.

The median age was 32.8 years. 18.6% of residents were under the age of 18; 20.5% were between the ages of 18 and 24; 21.9% were from 25 to 44; 21% were from 45 to 64; and 18% were 65 or older. The gender makeup of the city was 48.1% male and 51.9% female.

=== 2000 census ===
At the 2000 census, there were 7,818 people in 2,909 households, including 1,870 families, in the city. The population density was 3,232.2 people per square mile (1,247.3/km^{2}). There were 3,134 housing units at an average density of 1,295.7 per square mile (500.0/km^{2}). The racial makeup of the city was 86.83% White, 1.55% African American, 0.46% Native American, 1.75% Asian, 0.52% Pacific Islander, 6.28% from other races, and 2.61% from two or more races. Hispanic or Latino of any race were 12.74% of the population.

Of the 2,909 households 28.5% had children under the age of 18 living with them, 50.5% were married couples living together, 10.8% had a female householder with no husband present, and 35.7% were non-families. 29.4% of households were one person and 11.9% were one person aged 65 or older. The average household size was 2.36 and the average family size was 2.93.

The age distribution was 21.1% under the age of 18, 21.4% from 18 to 24, 23.2% from 25 to 44, 16.6% from 45 to 64, and 17.7% 65 or older. The median age was 31 years. For every 100 females, there were 91.6 males. For every 100 females age 18 and over, there were 87.8 males.

The median household income was $30,330 and the median family income was $40,833. Males had a median income of $34,167 versus $25,871 for females. The per capita income for the city was $14,493. About 11.3% of families and 16.0% of the population were below the poverty line, including 17.8% of those under age 18 and 7.6% of those age 65 or over.

== Education ==
Most of College Place is in the College Place School District; a small portion of the city's east side is served by Walla Walla Public Schools.

The City is also home to Walla Walla Valley Adventist Schools which is a private, Seventh-Day Adventist School System. Rogers School is a Seventh-Day Adventist Elementary School. Walla Walla Valley Academy is a Seventh-Day Adventist High School. The campuses are located along Academy Way just west of Walla Walla University.

== Notable people ==
- Kenneth Rooks 2023 National Champion in the 3000 meters steeplechase
- Charles E. Woodworth - Agricultural Research Service researcher
