= List of Kappa Delta Pi chapters =

Kappa Delta Pi is an American honor society for education. It was formed at the University of Illinois Urbana-Champaign in 1911.

== Collegiate chapters ==
Following is a list of Kappa Delta Pi chapters, with active chapters indicated in bold and inactive chapters and institutions are in italics.

Number	Chapter	Charter date and range	Institution	Location	Status	Ref.
1	Alpha	1911	University of Illinois Urbana-Champaign	Champaign, Illinois	Inactive	
2	Beta	1912	University of Colorado Boulder	Boulder, Colorado	Inactive	
3	Gamma	1915	University of Oklahoma	Norman, Oklahoma	Inactive	
4	Delta	1916–1932	University of Texas at Austin	Austin, Texas	Inactive	
5	**Epsilon**	1917	Drake University	Des Moines, Iowa	Active	
6	**Zeta**	1917	University of Cincinnati	Cincinnati, Ohio	Active	
7	**Eta**	1919	Purdue University	West Lafayette, Indiana	Active	
8	**Theta**	1920	University of Northern Colorado	Greeley, Colorado	Active	(Note: Chapter formed at the State Normal School of Colorado, now University of Northern Colorado.)
9	**Iota**	1920	Emporia State University	Emporia, Kansas	Active	(Note: Chapter formed at the Kansas State Normal School, now Emporia State University.)
10	Kappa	1920	Teachers College, Columbia University	New York City, New York	Inactive	
11	Lambda	1922	Oklahoma State University	Stillwater, Oklahoma	Inactive	
12	**Mu**	1922	Illinois State University	Normal, Illinois	Active	
13	**Nu**	1922	Miami University	Oxford, Ohio	Active	
14	Xi	1922	University of Alabama	Tuscaloosa, Alabama	Inactive	
15	Omicron	1922	Northern State University	Aberdeen, South Dakota	Inactive	(Note: Chapter formed at the Northern Normal and Industrial School, now Northern State University.)
16	**Pi**	1922	Eastern Michigan University	Ypsilanti, Michigan	Active	(Note: Chapter formed at Michigan State Normal College, now Eastern Michigan University.)
17	**Rho**	1922	University of Central Missouri	Warrensburg, Missouri	Active	(Note: Chapter formed at Central Missouri State Teachers College, now the University of Central Missouri.)
18	Sigma	1923–1936	Pennsylvania State College	State College, Pennsylvania	Inactive	
19	**Tau**	1923	Truman State University	Kirksville, Missouri	Active	(Note: Chapter formed at Northeast Missouri State Teachers College, now Truman State University.)
20	Upsilon	1923	University of Florida	Gainesville, Florida	Inactive	
21	Phi	1923	Marshall University	Huntington, West Virginia	Inactive	
22	Chi	1923	Western Colorado University	Gunnison, Colorado	Inactive	
23	**Psi**	1923	University of Northern Iowa	Cedar Falls, Iowa	Active	(Note: Chapter formed at the Iowa State Teachers College, now the University of Northern Iowa.)
24	**Omega**	1923	Ohio University	Athens, Ohio	Active	
25	**Alpha Alpha**	1923	Ohio Wesleyan University	Delaware, Ohio	Active	
26	**Alpha Beta**	1924	University of Arkansas	Fayetteville, Arkansas	Active	
27	**Alpha Gamma**	1924	University of Kentucky	Lexington, Kentucky	Active	
28	**Alpha Delta**	1925	Florida State University	Tallahassee, Florida	Active	
29	Alpha Epsilon	1925	Western Illinois University	Macomb, Illinois	Inactive	
30	**Alpha Zeta**	1925	Pittsburg State University	Pittsburg, Kansas	Active	(Note: Chapter formed at the Kansas State Teachers College of Pittsburg, now Pittsburg State University.)
31	**Alpha Eta**	1925	Southeast Missouri State University	Cape Girardeau, Missouri	Active	
32	Alpha Theta	1925	University of Akron	Akron, Ohio	Inactive	(Note: Chapter formed at the Municipal University of Akron, now the University of Akron.)
33	Alpha Iota	1926	University of North Texas	Denton, Texas	Inactive	(Note: Chapter formed at North Texas State Teachers College, at the University of North Texas.)
34	Alpha Kappa	1926	Indiana State University	Terre Haute, Indiana	Inactive	(Note: Chapter formed at Indiana State Teachers College, now Indiana State University.)
35	Alpha Lambda	1926	University of Denver	Denver, Colorado	Inactive	
36	**Alpha Mu**	1926	University of Wyoming	Laramie, Wyoming	Active	
37	Alpha Nu	1927	California State University, Chico	Chico, California	Inactive	(Note: Chapter formed at Chico State Teachers College, now the California State University, Chico.)
38	Alpha Xi	1927	College of William & Mary	Williamsburg, Virginia	Inactive	
39	**Alpha Omicron**	1927–1940, xxxx ?	Franklin College	Franklin, Indiana	Active	
40	**Alpha Pi**	1927	Vanderbilt Peabody College of Education and Human Development	Nashville, Tennessee	Active	(Note: Chapter formed at the George Peabody College for Teachers, now the education school of Vanderbilt University.)
41	Alpha Rho	1927	University of California, Santa Barbara	Santa Barbara, California	Inactive	(Note: Chapter formed at Santa Barbara State Teachers College, now the University of California, Santa Barbara.)
42	Alpha Sigma	1927	San Diego State University	San Diego, California	Inactive	(Note: Chapter formed at San Diego State Teachers College, now San Diego State University.)
43	Alpha Tau	1927	Duke University	Durham, North Carolina	Inactive	
44	**Alpha Upsilon**	1927	West Virginia University	Morgantown, West Virginia	Active	
45	Alpha Phi	1928	Auburn University	Auburn, Alabama	Inactive	(Note: Chaper formed at the Alabama Polytechnic Institute, now Auburn University.)
46	**Alpha Chi**	1928	James Madison University	Harrisonburg, Virginia	Active	(Note: Chapter formed at the State Teachers College at Harrisonburg, now James Madison University.)
47	**Alpha Psi**	1928	Heidelberg University	Tiffin, Ohio	Active	
48	**Alpha Omega**	1928	Oregon State University	Corvallis, Oregon	Active	
49	Beta Alpha	1928	San Jose State University	San Jose, California	Inactive	(Note: Chapter formed at San Jose State Teachers College, now San Jose State University.)
50	Beta Beta	1928–1965	University of New Hampshire	Durham, New Hampshire	Inactive	
51	Beta Gamma	1928	Indiana University of Pennsylvania	Indiana, Pennsylvania	Inactive	(Note: Chapter formed at the State Teachers College at Indiana, now the Indiana University of Pennsylvania.)
52	Beta Delta	1928	Southeastern Oklahoma State University	Durant, Oklahoma	Inactive	(Note: Chapter formed at Southeastern State Teachers College, now Southeastern Oklahoma State University.)
53	**Beta Epsilon**	1928	Longwood University	Farmville, Virginia	Active	(Note: Chapter formed at State Teachers College, now Longwood University.)
54	Beta Zeta	1928	University of Idaho	Moscow, Idaho	Inactive	
55	**Beta Eta**	1928	Oklahoma Baptist University	Shawnee, Oklahoma	Active	
56	**Beta Theta**	1929	University of Wisconsin–Oshkosh	Oshkosh, Wisconsin	Active	(Note: Chapter formed at the Oshkosh State Teachers College, now University of Wisconsin–Oshkosh.)
57	Beta Iota	1929	Western Michigan University	Kalamazoo, Michigan	Inactive	(Note: Chapter formed at Western State Teachers College, now Western Michigan University.)
58	Beta Kappa	1929	University of Georgia	Athens, Georgia	Inactive	
59	**Beta Lambda**	1929	University of Montevallo	Montevallo, Alabama	Active	(Note: Chapter formed at the Alabama College, now the University of Montevallo.)
60	**Beta Mu**	1929	Peru State College	Peru, Nebraska	Active	(Note: Chapter formed at the Nebraska State Teachers College at Peru, now Peru State College.)
61	**Beta Nu**	1929	Black Hills State University	Spearfish, South Dakota	Active	(Note: Chapter formed at the Dakota Territorial Normal School, now Black Hills State University.)
62	Beta Xi	1929	Baylor University	Waco, Texas	Inactive	
63	Beta Omicron	1930	University of Wisconsin–Milwaukee	Milwaukee, Wisconsin	Inactive	
64	**Beta Pi**	1930	New York University	New York City, New York	Active	
65	Beta Rho	1930	Commonwealth University-Mansfield	Mansfield, Pennsylvania	Inactive	(Note: Chapter formed at Mansfield State Teachers College, now Commonwealth University-Mansfield.)
66	Beta Sigma	1930–1932	Georgia State Teachers College	Athens, Georgia	Inactive	(Note: Georgia State Teachers College merged with the Peabody School of Education, forming the College of Education at University of Georgia.)
67	**Beta Tau**	1930	University of Wisconsin–La Crosse	La Crosse, Wisconsin	Active	(Note: Chapter formed at La Crosse State Teachers College, now University of Wisconsin–La Crosse.)
68	Beta Upsilon	1930	Washington University in St. Louis	St. Louis, Missouri	Inactive	
69	Beta Phi	1930	Arizona State University	Tempe, Arizona	Inactive	(Note: Chapter formed at the Tempe State Teachers College, now Arizona State University.)
70	**Beta Chi**	1930	Northern Arizona University	Flagstaff, Arizona	Active	(Note: Chapter formed at Arizona State Teachers College at Flagstaff, now Northern Arizona University.)
71	Beta Psi	1931	Eastern Illinois University	Charleston, Illinois	Inactive	
72	**Beta Omega**	1931	Fairmont State University	Fairmont, West Virginia	Active	
73	**Gamma Alpha**	1931	Radford University	Radford, Virginia	Active	(Note: Chapter formed at the State Teachers College at Radford, now Radford University.)
74	Gamma Beta	1931	Commonwealth University-Bloomsburg	Bloomsburg, Pennsylvania	Inactive	(Note: Chapter formed at Bloomsburg State Teachers College, now Commonwealth University-Bloomsburg.)
75	Gamma Gamma	1931	Minnesota State University Moorhead	Moorhead, Minnesota	Inactive	(Note: Chapter formed at Moorhead State Teachers College, now Minnesota State University Moorhead.)
76	Gamma Delta	1931	North Dakota State University	Fargo, North Dakota	Inactive	(Note: Chapter formed at North Dakota Agricultural College, now North Dakota State University.)
77	**Gamma Epsilon**	1931	Montclair State University	Montclair, New Jersey	Active	
78	**Gamma Zeta**	1931	The College of New Jersey	Ewing Township, New Jersey	Active	(Note: Chapter formed at the New Jersey State Teachers College and State Normal School at Trenton, now The College of New Jersey.)
79	Gamma Eta	1931	Western New Mexico University	Silver City, New Mexico	Inactive	
80	Gamma Theta	1931	Ball State University	Muncie, Indiana	Inactive	
81	Gamma Iota	1931	City College of New York	New York City, New York	Inactive	
82	Gamma Kappa	1931	University of Tulsa	Tulsa, Oklahoma	Inactive	
83	**Gamma Lambda**	1931	Harris–Stowe State University	St. Louis, Missouri	Active	(Note: Chapter formed at Harris Teachers College, now Harris–Stowe State University.)
84	Gamma Mu	1931	University of Buffalo	Buffalo, New York	Inactive	
85	**Gamma Nu**	1931	Butler University	Indianapolis, Indiana	Active	
86	**Gamma Xi**	1931	East Stroudsburg University of Pennsylvania	East Stroudsburg, Pennsylvania	Active	(Note: Chapter formed at East Stroudsburg State Teachers College, now East Stroudsburg University of Pennsylvania.)
87	**Gamma Omicron**	1932	University of Maine	Orono, Maine	Active	
88	**Gamma Pi**	1932	St. Cloud State University	St. Cloud, Minnesota	Active	
89	Gamma Rho	1932	Wichita State University	Wichita, Kansas	Inactive	(Note: Chapter formed at the Municipal University of Wichita, now Wichita State University.)
90	Gamma Sigma	1934–1965	San Francisco State University	San Francisco, California	Inactive	
91	**Gamma Tau**	1934	Winona State University	Winona, Minnesota	Active	
92	**Gamma Upsilon**	1934	Louisiana State University	Baton Rouge, Louisiana	Active	
93	Gamma Phi	1934	Northwestern State University	Natchitoches, Louisiana	Inactive	(Note: Chapter formed at Louisiana State Normal School, now Northwestern State University.)
94	**Gamma Chi**	1935	Worcester State University	Worcester, Massachusetts	Active	
95	Gamma Psi	1935	California State University, Fresno	Fresno, California	Inactive	(Note: Chapter formed at Fresno State Normal School, now California State University, Fresno.)
96	**Gamma Omega**	1935	University of Central Oklahoma	Edmond, Oklahoma	Active	(Note: Chapter formed at the Central State Teachers College, now University of Central Oklahoma.)
97	**Delta Alpha**	1935	Eastern Kentucky University	Richmond, Kentucky	Active	(Note: Chapter formed at Eastern Kentucky State Teachers College, now Eastern Kentucky University.)
98	Delta Beta	1935	Kent State University	Kent, Ohio	Inactive	
99	Delta Gamma	1935	Concord University	Athens, West Virginia	Inactive	(Note: Chapter formed at Concord State Teachers College, now Concord University.)
100	**Delta Delta**	1935	Winthrop University	Rock Hill, South Carolina	Active	
101	**Delta Epsilon**	1935	Northern Illinois University	DeKalb, Illinois	Active	
102	Delta Zeta	1935	Northern Michigan University	Marquette, Michigan	Inactive	(Note: Chapter formed at Northern State Teachers College, now Northern Michigan University.)
103	Delta Eta	1936	Northwestern Oklahoma State University	Alva, Oklahoma	Inactive	
104	**Delta Theta**	1936	Sam Houston State University	Huntsville, Texas	Active	
105	Delta Iota	1936	University of Louisiana at Lafayette	Lafayette, Louisiana	Inactive	(Note: Chapter formed at Southwestern Louisiana Institute of Liberal and Technical Learning, now University of Louisiana at Lafayette.)
106	Delta Kappa	1936	Eastern Washington University	Cheney, Washington	Inactive	(Note: Chapter formed at the State Normal School at Cheney, now Eastern Washington University.)
107	Delta Lambda	1936–c. 1977	District of Columbia Teachers College	Washington, D.C.	Inactive	(Note: Chapter formed at the District of Columbia Teachers College, which combined with two other institutions to form the University of the District of Columbia in 1977.)
108	Delta Mu	1937	Westminster College	New Wilmington, Pennsylvania	Inactive	
109	**Delta Nu**	1938	University of Wisconsin–Whitewater	Whitewater, Wisconsin	Active	(Note: Chapter formed at Whitewater Teachers College, now the University of Wisconsin–Whitewater.)
110	**Delta Xi**	1938	Rutgers University–New Brunswick	New Brunswick, New Jersey	Active	
111	Delta Omicron	1938	Central Washington University	Ellensburg, Washington	Inactive	
112	**Delta Pi**	1938	Henderson State University	Arkadelphia, Arkansas	Active	
113	**Delta Rho**	1938	Rutgers University–Newark	Newark, New Jersey	Active	
114	**Delta Sigma**	1938	Commonwealth University-Lock Haven	Lock Haven, Pennsylvania	Active	(Note: Chapter formed at State Teachers College in Lock Haven, now Commonwealth University-Lock Haven.)
115	**Delta Tau**	1938	Slippery Rock University	Slippery Rock, Pennsylvania	Active	
116	**Delta Upsilon**	1938	New Jersey City University	Jersey City, New Jersey	Active	(Note: Chapter formed at Teachers College at Jersey City, now New Jersey City University.)
117	**Delta Phi**	1939	Bowling Green State University	Bowling Green, Ohio	Active	
118	**Delta Chi**	1939	Southern Illinois University Carbondale	Carbondale, Illinois	Active	(Note: Chapter formed at Southern Illinois Normal University, now Southern Illinois University Carbondale.)
119	Delta Psi	1939	Shepherd University	Shepherdstown, West Virginia	Inactive	
120	Delta Omega	1939	Murray State University	Murray, Kentucky	Inactive	
121	**Epsilon Alpha**	1940	Towson University	Towson, Maryland	Active	(Note: Chapter formed at Maryland State Teachers College at Towson, now Towson University.)
122	Epsilon Beta	1940	Tulane University	New Orleans, Louisiana	Inactive	
123	**Epsilon Gamma**	1940	Florida Southern College	Lakeland, Florida	Active	
124	**Epsilon Delta**	1941	PennWest California	California, Pennsylvania	Active	(Note: Chapter formed at California State Teachers College, now PennWest California.)
125	**Epsilon Epsilon**	1941	Shippensburg University of Pennsylvania	Shippensburg, Pennsylvania	Active	(Note: Chapter formed at State Teachers College at Shippensburg, now Shippensburg University of Pennsylvania.)
126	Epsilon Zeta	1941	Kutztown University of Pennsylvania	Kutztown, Pennsylvania	Inactive	(Note: Chapter formed at Kutztown State Teacher's College, now Kutztown University of Pennsylvania.)
127	**Epsilon Eta**	1941	Central Michigan University	Mount Pleasant, Michigan	Active	
128	**Epsilon Theta**	1942	Morehead State University	Morehead, Kentucky	Active	
129	Epsilon Iota	1942	Bridgewater State University	Bridgewater, Massachusetts	Inactive	
130	**Epsilon Kappa**	1942	Michigan State University	East Lansing, Michigan	Active	
131	**Epsilon Lambda**	1942	University of Texas at El Paso	El Paso, Texas	Active	
132	Epsilon Mu	1943	Central Connecticut State University	New Britain, Connecticut	Inactive	
133	**Epsilon Nu**	1943	Eastern Connecticut State University	Willimantic, Connecticut	Active	(Note: Chapter formed at Willimantic State Teachers College, now Eastern Connecticut State University.)
134	Epsilon Xi	1943	Western Connecticut State University	Danbury, Connecticut	Inactive	(Note: Chapter formed at Danbury State Teachers College, now Western Connecticut State University.)
135	**Epsilon Omicron**	1943	University of Wisconsin–Eau Claire	Eau Claire, Wisconsin	Active	(Note: Chapter formed at Eau Claire State Teachers College, now the University of Wisconsin–Eau Claire.)
136	Epsilon Pi	1943	Keene State College	Keene, New Hampshire	Inactive	(Note: Chapter formed at Keene Teachers College, now Keene State College.)
137	**Epsilon Rho**	1944	Rhode Island College	Providence, Rhode Island	Active	
138	Epsilon Sigma	1944	State University of New York at Oneonta	Oneonta, New York	Inactive	(Note: Chapter formed at New York State Teachers College at Oneonta, now the State University of New York at Oneonta.)
139	**Epsilon Tau**	1944	State University of New York at Geneseo	Geneseo, New York	Active	
140	**Epsilon Upsilon**	1944	State University of New York at Potsdam	Potsdam, New York	Active	
141	Epsilon Phi	1944	Jacksonville State University	Jacksonville, Alabama	Inactive	
142	**Epsilon Chi**	1945	State University of New York at Cortland	Cortland, New York	Active	
143	Epsilon Psi	1945	University of North Alabama	Florence, Alabama	Inactive	(Note: Chapter formed at Florence State Teacher's College, now University of North Alabama.)
144	**Epsilon Omega**	1945	State University of New York at Oswego	Oswego, New York	Active	(Note: Chapter formed at Oswego State Teachers College, now State University of New York at Oswego.)
145	**Zeta Alpha**	1945	William Paterson University	Wayne, New Jersey	Active	(Note: Chapter formed at New Jersey State Teacher’s College at Paterson, now William Paterson University.)
146	Zeta Beta	1946	University of Minnesota Duluth	Duluth, Minnesota	Inactive	(Note: Chapter formed at Duluth State Teachers College, now University of Minnesota Duluth.)
147	**Zeta Gamma**	1946	Troy University	Troy, Alabama	Active	(Note: Chapter formed at Troy State Teachers College, now Troy University.)
148	Zeta Delta	1946	Sul Ross State University	Alpine, Texas	Inactive	(Note: Chapter formed at The Sul Ross State Teachers College at Alpine, now Sul Ross State University.)
149	**Zeta Epsilon**	1946	University of Toledo	Toledo, Ohio	Active	
150	**Zeta Zeta**	1946	State University of New York at New Paltz	New Paltz, New York	Active	
151	**Zeta Eta**	1947	University of Mississippi	University, Mississippi	Active	
152	**Zeta Theta**	1947–1966, xxxx ?	Samford University	Birmingham, Alabama	Active	(Note: Chapter formed at Howard College, now Samford University.)
153	Zeta Iota	1947	East Tennessee State University	Johnson City, Tennessee	Inactive	
154	**Zeta Kappa**	1948	Southeastern Louisiana University	Hammond, Louisiana	Active	
155	Zeta Lambda	1948	Northwest Missouri State University	Maryville, Missouri	Inactive	
156	**Zeta Mu**	1948	East Texas A&M University	Commerce, Texas	Active	(Note: Chapter formed at East Texas State Teachers College, now East Texas A&M University.)
157	**Zeta Nu**	1948	Arcadia University	Glenside, Pennsylvania	Active	(Note: Chapter formed at Beaver College, now Arcadia University.)
158	Zeta Xi	1948	Minot State University	Minot, North Dakota	Inactive	
159	**Zeta Omicron**	1949	University of Delaware	Newark, Delaware	Active	
160	Zeta Pi	1949	State University of New York Brockport	Brockport, New York	Inactive	
161	Zeta Rho	1949	Loyola University New Orleans	New Orleans, Louisiana	Inactive	
162	**Zeta Sigma**	1950	Valley City State University	Valley City, North Dakota	Active	
163	**Zeta Tau**	1950	Stetson University	DeLand, Florida	Active	
164	**Zeta Upsilon**	1950	State University of New York at Fredonia	Fredonia, New York	Active	
165	Zeta Phi	1950	University of Miami	Coral Gables, Florida	Inactive	
166	**Zeta Chi**	1950–19xx ?; April 3, 2024	Tennessee State University	Nashville, Tennessee	Active	(Note: Chapter formed at Tennessee Agricultural & Industrial State, now Tennessee State University.)
167	Zeta Psi				Inactive	
168	**Zeta Omega**	1951	University of Houston	Houston, Texas	Active	
169	Eta Alpha	1951	Seattle University	Seattle, Washington	Inactive	
170	Eta Beta	1951	Western Washington University	Bellingham, Washington	Inactive	
171	Eta Gamma	1951	Georgia Southern University	Statesboro, Georgia	Inactive	(Note: Chapter formed at Georgia Teachers College, now Georgia Southern University.)
172	**Eta Delta**	1951	Arkansas State University	Jonesboro, Arkansas	Active	
173	Eta Epsilon	1951	McMurry University	Abilene, Texas	Inactive	
174	**Eta Zeta**	1951	Texas State University	San Marcos, Texas	Active	(Note: Chapter formed at Southwest Texas State Teachers College, now Texas State University.)
175	Eta Eta	1951	Macalester College	Saint Paul, Minnesota	Inactive	
176	**Eta Theta**	1951	Brooklyn College	New York City, New York	Active	
177	**Eta Iota**	1951	PennWest Edinboro	Edinboro, Pennsylvania	Active	(Note: Chapter formed at Edinboro State Teachers College, now PennWest Edinboro.)
178	Eta Kappa	1951	University of Virginia	Charlottesville, Virginia	Inactive	
179	Eta Lambda	1952	University of Wisconsin–River Falls	River Falls, Wisconsin	Inactive	(Note: Chapter formed at Wisconsin State College–River Falls, now University of Wisconsin–River Falls.)
180	Eta Mu	1952	Southern University	Baton Rouge, Louisiana	Inactive	
181	**Eta Nu**	1952	Tennessee Tech	Cookeville, Tennessee	Active	
182	Eta Xi	1952	Youngstown State University	Youngstown, Ohio	Inactive	
183	Eta Omicron	1953	University of Louisville	Louisville, Kentucky	Inactive	
184	**Eta Pi**	1953	Denison University	Granville, Ohio	Active	
185	Eta Rho	1953	Austin Peay State University	Clarksville, Tennessee	Inactive	
186	Eta Sigma	1953	Langston University	Langston, Oklahoma	Inactive	
187	**Eta Tau**	1953	University of Lynchburg	Lynchburg, Virginia	Active	
188	**Eta Upsilon**	1953	University of Vermont	Burlington, Vermont	Active	
189	**Eta Phi**	1953	University of Nebraska at Kearney	Kearney, Nebraska	Active	
190	**Eta Chi**	1953	East Carolina University	Greenville, North Carolina	Active	
191	**Eta Psi**	1953	Rowan University	Glassboro, New Jersey	Active	(Note: Chapter formed at New Jersey State Teachers College at Glassboro, now Rowan University.)
192	Eta Omega	1954	University of Nebraska Omaha	Omaha, Nebraska	Inactive	(Note: Chapter formed at the University of Omaha, now University of Nebraska Omaha.)
193	**Theta Alpha**	1954	Howard University	Washington, D.C.	Active	
194	**Theta Beta**	1954	Hofstra University	Hempstead, New York	Active	
195	Theta Gamma	1954	University of Southern Mississippi	Hattiesburg, Mississippi	Inactive	(Note: Chapter formed at Mississippi Southern College, now University of Southern Mississippi.)
196	**Theta Delta**	1954	Delta State University	Cleveland, Mississippi	Active	
197	Theta Epsilon	1954	Abilene Christian University	Abilene, Texas	Inactive	
198	Theta Zeta	1954	Phillips University	Enid, Oklahoma	Inactive	
199	Theta Eta	1955	National College of Education	Chicago, Illinois	Inactive	
200	**Theta Theta**	1955	University of Richmond	Richmond, Virginia	Active	
201	**Theta Iota**	1955	Florida A&M University	Tallahassee, Florida	Active	
202	**Theta Kappa**	1955	State University of New York at Plattsburgh	Plattsburgh, New York	Active	
203	Theta Lambda	1955	Willamette University	Salem, Oregon	Inactive	
204	Theta Mu	1955	South Dakota State University	Brookings, South Dakota	Inactive	
205	**Theta Nu**	1956	Nebraska Wesleyan University	Lincoln, Nebraska	Active	
206	**Theta Xi**	1956	Morgan State University	Baltimore, Maryland	Active	
207	**Theta Omicron**	1956	Middle Tennessee State University	Murfreesboro, Tennessee	Active	
208	Theta Pi	1956	California State University, Sacramento	Sacramento, California	Inactive	(Note: Chapter formed at Sacramento State College, now California State University, Sacramento.)
209	Theta Rho	1956	Chicago State University	Chicago, Illinois	Inactive	(Note: Chapter formed at the Chicago Teachers College, now Chicago State University.)
210	**Theta Sigma**	1956	University of the District of Columbia	Washington, D.C.	Active	
211	Theta Tau	1957	North Carolina A&T State University	Greensboro, North Carolina	Inactive	
212	**Theta Upsilon**	1958	Howard Payne University	Brownwood, Texas	Active	
213	**Theta Phi**	1958	Catawba College	Salisbury, North Carolina	Active	
214	**Theta Chi**	1958	Mississippi State University	Mississippi State, Mississippi	Active	
215	Theta Psi	1958	St. Mary's Dominican College	New Orleans, Louisiana	Inactive	
216	**Theta Omega**	1958	Ouachita Baptist University	Arkadelphia, Arkansas	Active	
2017	Iota Alpha	1958	Hunter College	New York City, New York	Inactive	
218	**Iota Beta**	1959	Mississippi College	Clinton, Mississippi	Active	
219	Iota Gamma	1959	Stephen F. Austin State University	Nacogdoches, Texas	Inactive	
220	Iota Delta	1959	University of Connecticut	Storrs, Connecticut	Inactive	
221	Iota Epsilon	1959	Virginia State University	Ettrick, Virginia	Inactive	
222	Iota Zeta	1959	Carroll University	Waukesha, Wisconsin	Inactive	
223	Iota Eta	1959	Louisiana Christian University	Pineville, Louisiana	Inactive	
224	Iota Theta	1960	West Texas A&M University	Canyon, Texas	Inactive	
225	**Iota Iota**	1960	Westfield State University	Westfield, Massachusetts	Active	
226	**Iota Kappa**	1960	Ohio Northern University	Ada, Ohio	Active	
227	Iota Lambda	1960	Augustana University	Sioux Falls, South Dakota	Inactive	
228	**Iota Mu**	1960	Hampton University	Hampton, Virginia	Active	
229	**Iota Nu**	1961	Bucknell University	Lewisburg, Pennsylvania	Active	
230	**Iota Xi**	1961	Kansas State University	Manhattan, Kansas	Active	
231	Iota Omicron	1961	Southern Oregon University	Ashland, Oregon	Inactive	
232	**Iota Pi**	1962	Berea College	Berea, Kentucky	Active	
233	Iota Rho	1962	University of Wisconsin–Platteville	Platteville, Wisconsin	Inactive	
234	**Iota Sigma**	1962	University of Rhode Island	Kingston, Rhode Island	Active	
235	**Iota Tau**	1962	Grambling State University	Grambling, Louisiana	Active	
236	**Iota Upsilon**	1962	University of Maryland, College Park	College Park, Maryland	Active	
237	Iota Phi	1962	University of California, Los Angeles	Los Angeles, California	Inactive	
238	Iota Chi	1962	University of Dubuque	Dubuque, Iowa	Inactive	
239	**Iota Psi**	1962	DePaul University	Chicago, Illinois	Active	
240	**Iota Omega**	1963	St. Ambrose University	Davenport, Iowa	Active	
241	Kappa Alpha	1963	Hiram College	Hiram, Ohio	Inactive	
242	**Kappa Beta**	1963	Wayne State College	Wayne, Nebraska	Active	
243	**Kappa Gamma**	1963	Queens College, City University of New York	Flushing, Queens, New York City, New York	Active	
244	Kappa Delta	1964	Elizabeth City State University	Elizabeth City, North Carolina	Inactive	
245	Kappa Epsilon	1964	University of Charleston	Charleston, West Virginia	Inactive	(Note: Chapter formed at Morris Harvey College, which became the University of Charleston in 1978.)
246	Kappa Zeta	1964	Northeastern University	Boston, Massachusetts	Inactive	
247	**Kappa Eta**	1964	St. John's University	Queens, New York City, New York	Active	
248	Kappa Theta	1965	Illinois Wesleyan University	Bloomington, Illinois	Inactive	
249	**Kappa Iota**	1965	Wartburg College	Waverly, Iowa	Active	
250	Kappa Kappa	1965	Mercy College of Detroit	Detroit, Michigan	Inactive	(Note: The college merged with University of Detroit to form the University of Detroit Mercy in 1990.)
251	Kappa Lambda	1965	University of Massachusetts Amherst	Amherst, Massachusetts	Inactive	
252	**Kappa Mu**	1965	High Point University	High Point, North Carolina	Active	
253	**Kappa Nu**	1966	Ashland University	Ashland, Ohio	Active	
254	Kappa Xi	1966	LSU Health Sciences Center New Orleans	New Orleans, Louisiana	Inactive	
255	**Kappa Omicron**	1966	Glenville State University	Glenville, West Virginia	Active	
256	Kappa Pi	1966	University of Arizona	Tucson, Arizona	Inactive	
257	**Kappa Rho**	1966	Northeastern State University	Tahlequah, Oklahoma	Active	
258	**Kappa Sigma**	1966	Gonzaga University	Spokane, Washington	Active	
259	**Kappa Tau**	1966	University of Tampa	Tampa, Florida	Active	
260	Kappa Upsilon	1966	Texas Christian University	Fort Worth, Texas	Inactive	
261	**Kappa Phi**	1966	West Chester University	West Chester, Pennsylvania	Active	
262	Kappa Chi	1966	Framingham State University	Framingham, Massachusetts	Inactive	
263	Kappa Psi	1966	Texas Southern University	Houston, Texas	Inactive	
264	**Kappa Omega**	1966	Baldwin Wallace University	Berea, Ohio	Active	
265	Lambda Alpha	1966	Plymouth State University	Plymouth, New Hampshire	Inactive	
266	**Lambda Beta**	1966	Missouri State University	Springfield, Missouri	Active	
267	Lambda Gamma	1967	Memphis State University	Memphis, Tennessee	Inactive	
268	**Lambda Delta**	1967	Tuskegee University	Tuskegee, Alabama	Active	
269	Lambda Epsilon	1967	University of Bridgeport	Bridgeport, Connecticut	Inactive	
270	Lambda Zeta	1967	West Virginia State University	Institute, West Virginia	Inactive	
271	**Lambda Eta**	1967	PennWest Clarion	Clarion, Pennsylvania	Active	(Note: Chapter formed at Clarion University of Pennsylvania, now PennWest Clarion.)
272	Lambda Theta	1967	Southern Illinois University Carbondale	Carbondale, Illinois	Inactive	
273	**Lambda Iota**	1967	Appalachian State University	Boone, North Carolina	Active	
274	**Lambda Kappa**	1967	Rollins College	Winter Park, Florida	Active	
275	Lambda Lambda	1968	Minnesota State University, Mankato	Mankato, Minnesota	Inactive	(Note: Chapter formed at Mankato State College, now Minnesota State University, Mankato.)
276	**Lambda Mu**	1968	Pepperdine University	Malibu, California	Active	
277	Lambda Nu	1968	Daemen University	Amherst, New York	Inactive	
278	**Lambda Xi**	1968	Fordham University	New York City, New York	Active	
279	Lambda Omicron	1968	University of Maine at Farmington	Farmington, Maine	Inactive	
280	Lambda Pi	1968	Arkansas Tech University	Russellville, Arkansas	Inactive	
281	Lambda Rho	1968	Carson–Newman University	Jefferson City, Tennessee	Inactive	
282	**Lambda Sigma**	1968	Valparaiso University	Valparaiso, Indiana	Active	
283	**Lambda Tau**	1968	University of South Florida	Tampa, Florida	Active	
284	Lambda Upsilon	1969	Adrian College	Adrian, Michigan	Inactive	
285	Lambda Phi	1969	Wright State University	Fairborn, Ohio	Inactive	
286	Lambda Chi	1969	California State University, Long Beach	Long Beach, California	Inactive	
287	Lambda Psi	1969	University of Texas–Pan American	Edinburg, Texas	Inactive	(Note: In 2015, UTPA ceased operations to yield to the newly formed University of Texas Rio Grande Valley.)
288	Lambda Omega	1969	Trinity University	San Antonio, Texas	Inactive	
289	**Mu Alpha**	1969	University of Tennessee at Chattanooga	Chattanooga, Tennessee	Active	
290	**Mu Beta**	1969	Midwestern State University	Wichita Falls, Texas	Active	
291	**Mu Gamma**	1969	Angelo State University	San Angelo, Texas	Active	
292	**Mu Delta**	1970	University of Missouri	Columbia, Missouri	Active	
293	Mu Epsilon	1970	Prairie View A&M University	Prairie View, Texas	Inactive	
294	Mu Zeta	1970	West Virginia Wesleyan College	Buckhannon, West Virginia	Inactive	
295	Mu Eta	1970	Western Carolina University	Cullowhee, North Carolina	Inactive	
296	Mu Theta	1970	Savannah State University	Savannah, Georgia	Inactive	
297	**Mu Iota**	1970	University of Missouri–St. Louis	St. Louis, Missouri	Active	
298	**Mu Kappa**	1970	Southwestern Oklahoma State University	Weatherford, Oklahoma	Active	
299	**Mu Lambda**	1971	Virginia Commonwealth University	Richmond, Virginia	Active	
300	**Mu Mu**	1971	University of Alabama at Birmingham	Birmingham, Alabama	Active	
301	Mu Nu	1971	University of Nevada, Las Vegas	Paradise, Nevada	Inactive	
302	**Mu Xi**	1971	Lehman College	Bronx, New York	Active	
303	Mu Omicron	1971	Nicholls State University	Thibodaux, Louisiana	Inactive	
304	Mu Pi	1971	Iowa State University	Ames, Iowa	Inactive	
305	Mu Rho	1971	Rutgers Graduate School of Education Douglas	New Brunswick, New Jersey	Inactive	
306	**Mu Sigma**	1971	Manhattan University	Bronx, New York City, New York	Active	
307	**Mu Tau**	1971	Anderson University	Anderson, Indiana	Active	
308	Mu Upsilon	1972	Clemson University	Clemson, South Carolina	Inactive	
309	**Mu Phi**	1972	University of Montana Western	Dillon, Montana	Active	
310	Mu Chi	1972	Texas A&M University	College Station, Texas	Inactive	
311	**Mu Psi**	1972	Indiana University Southeast	New Albany, Indiana	Active	
312	Mu Omega	1972	Alabama A&M University	Normal, Alabama	Inactive	
313	**Nu Alpha**	1972	George Mason University	Fairfax, Virginia	Active	
314	**Nu Beta**	1973	Olivet Nazarene University	Bourbonnais, Illinois	Active	
315	Nu Gamma	1973	Boston State College	Boston, Massachusetts	Inactive	(Note: The college merged into the University of Massachusetts Boston in 1982.)
316	Nu Delta	1973	University of Tennessee	Knoxville, Tennessee	Inactive	
317	**Nu Epsilon**	1973	Alabama State University	Montgomery, Alabama	Active	
318	Nu Zeta	1974	Armstrong State College	Savannah, Georgia	Inactive	
319	**Nu Eta**	1974	Old Dominion University	Norfolk, Virginia	Active	
320	Nu Theta	1975	Cheyney University of Pennsylvania	Cheyney, Pennsylvania	Inactive	
321	**Nu Iota**	1975	Southern Methodist University	Dallas, Texas	Active	
322	**Nu Kappa**	1975	University of Dallas	Irving, Texas	Active	
323	**Nu Lambda**	1975	Harding University	Searcy, Arkansas	Active	
324	**Nu Mu**	1975	Drury University	Springfield, Missouri	Active	
325	**Nu Nu**	1975	Adelphi University	Garden City, New York	Active	
326	**Nu Xi**	1975	University of Mary Washington	Fredericksburg, Virginia	Active	
327	**Nu Omicron**	1975	Albany State University	Albany, Georgia	Active	
328	Nu Pi	1975	Texas A&M University–Kingsville	Kingsville, Texas	Inactive	(Note: Chapter formed at Texas A&I University, now Texas A&M University–Kingsville.)
329	**Nu Rho**	1976	William Woods University	Fulton, Missouri	Active	
330	**Nu Sigma**	1976	Texas Tech University	Lubbock, Texas	Active	
331	**Nu Tau**	1976	Monmouth University	West Long Branch, New Jersey	Active	
332	**Nu Upsilon**	1976	Rutgers University–Camden	Camden, New Jersey	Active	
333	**Nu Phi**	1976	Belmont University	Nashville, Tennessee	Active	
334	**Nu Chi**	1976	University of Arkansas at Little Rock	Little Rock, Arkansas	Active	
335	Nu Psi	1976	Barry University	Miami Shores, Florida	Inactive	
336	Nu Omega	1977	West Virginia College of Graduate Students	Institute, West Virginia	Inactive	(Note: The West Virginia College of Graduate Studies (COGS) merged with Marshall University in 1997, becoming the Marshall University Graduate College.)
337	Xi Alpha	1977	University of Texas at Arlington	Arlington, Texas	Inactive	
338	**Xi Beta**	1977	Bowie State University	Bowie, Maryland	Active	
339	**Xi Gamma**	1977	Seton Hall University	South Orange, New Jersey	Active	
340	**Xi Delta**	1977	West Liberty University	West Liberty, West Virginia	Active	
341	Xi Epsilon	1977	Furman University	Greenville, South Carolina	Inactive	
342	Xi Zeta	1977	Virginia Tech	Blacksburg, Virginia	Inactive	
343	**Xi Eta**		DePauw University	Greencastle, Indiana	Active	
344	Xi Theta				Inactive	
345	Xi Iota				Inactive	
346	Xi Kappa				Inactive	
347	**Xi Lambda**		York College, City University of New York	Jamaica, Queens, New York City, New York	Active	
348	**Xi Mu**		University of Southern Indiana	Evansville, Indiana	Active	
349	**Xi Nu**	1977	St. Bonaventure University	St. Bonaventure, New York	Active	
350	**Xi Xi**		South Carolina State University	Orangeburg, South Carolina	Active	
351	**Xi Omicron**		Texas A&M University–Corpus Christi	Corpus Christi, Texas	Active	
352	**Xi Pi**		Western Kentucky University	Bowling Green, Kentucky	Active	
353	**Xi Rho**		St. Francis College	Brooklyn, New York	Active	t
354	Xi Sigma				Inactive	
355	**Xi Tau**		Delaware State University	Dover, Delaware	Active	
356	Xi Upsilon				Inactive	
357	**Xi Phi**		Villanova University	Villanova, Pennsylvania	Active	
358	Xi Chi				Inactive	
359	**Xi Psi**		Fitchburg State University	Fitchburg, Massachusetts	Active	
360	**Xi Omega**		Missouri Western State University	St. Joseph, Missouri	Active	
361	**Omicron Alpha**		Morningside University	Sioux City, Iowa	Active	
362	Omicron Beta				Inactive	
363	**Omicron Gamma**	January 27, 1980	Georgia State University	Atlanta, Georgia	Active	
364	**Omicron Delta**		University of West Florida	Pensacola, Florida	Active	
365	Omicron Epsilon				Inactive	
366	**Omicron Zeta**		University of South Alabama	Mobile, Alabama	Active	
367	**Omicron Eta**		University of Texas Rio Grande Valley	Edinburg, Texas	Active	
368	**Omicron Theta**		Florida International University	University Park, Florida	Active	
369	Omicron Iota				Inactive	
370	**Omicron Kappa**		University of Houston–Clear Lake	Houston, Texas	Active	
371	Omicron Lambda				Inactive	
372	Omicron Mu				Inactive	
373	Omicron Nu				Inactive	
374	Omicron Xi				Inactive	
375	Omicron Omicron				Inactive	
376	**Omicron Pi**	November 1981	University of North Carolina at Charlotte	Charlotte, North Carolina	Active	
377	Omicron Rho				Inactive	
378	Omicron Sigma				Inactive	
379	**Omicron Tau**		Washington State University	Pullman, Washington	Active	
380	**Omicron Upsilon**		Eastern New Mexico University	Portales, New Mexico	Active	
381	**Omicron Phi**		University of Pittsburgh	Pittsburgh, Pennsylvania	Active	
382	**Omicron Chi**		University of Texas at San Antonio	San Antonio, Texas	Active	
383	Omicron Psi				Inactive	
384	**Omicron Omega**		University of West Georgia	Carrollton, Georgia	Active	
385	Pi Alpha				Inactive	
386	**Pi Beta**		University of Central Arkansas	Conway, Arkansas	Active	
387	**Pi Gamma**		Georgia Southwestern State University	Americus, Georgia	Active	
388	**Pi Delta**	1982	Bethune–Cookman University	Daytona Beach, Florida	Active	
389	**Pi Epsilon**		University of Wisconsin–Stevens Point	Stevens Point, Wisconsin	Active	
390	**Pi Zeta**		Louisiana State University Shreveport	Shreveport, Louisiana	Active	
391	**Pi Eta**		Houston Christian University	Houston, Texas	Active	
392	**Pi Theta**		University of North Carolina at Chapel Hill	Chapel Hill, North Carolina	Active	
393	Pi Iota				Inactive	
394	Pi Kappa				Inactive	
395	**Pi Lambda**		University of St. Thomas	Houston, Texas	Active	
396	Pi Mu				Inactive	
397	Pi Nu				Inactive	
398	**Pi Xi**		Wagner College	Staten Island, New York	Active	
399	Pi Omicron				Inactive	
400	Pi Pi				Inactive	
401	Pi Rho				Inactive	
402	**Pi Sigma**	1984	Liberty University School of Education Residential Undergraduate	Lynchburg, Virginia	Active	
403	**Pi Tau**		Saint Mary's University of Minnesota	Winona, Minnesota	Active	
404	**Pi Upsilon**		University of Arkansas at Pine Bluff	Pine Bluff, Arkansas	Active	
405	**Pi Phi**		University of Hartford	West Hartford, Connecticut	Active	
406	Pi Chi				Inactive	
407	**Pi Psi**		Concordia University Chicago	River Forest, Illinois	Active	
408	**Pi Omega**		University of Science and Arts of Oklahoma	Chickasha, Oklahoma	Active	
409	Rho Alpha				Inactive	
410	Rho Beta				Inactive	
411	**Rho Gamma**		Athens State University	Athens, Alabama	Active	
412	Rho Delta				Inactive	
413	**Rho Epsilon**		California State University, Bakersfield	Bakersfield, California	Inactive	
414	**Rho Zeta**		University of Alaska Anchorage	Anchorage, Alaska	Active	
415	**Rho Eta**		Salisbury University	Salisbury, Maryland	Active	
416	**Rho Theta**		Vermont State University Castleton	Castleton, Vermont	Active	
417	Rho Iota				Inactive	
418	**Rho Kappa**		Purdue University Fort Wayne	Fort Wayne, Indiana	Inactive	
419	**Rho Lambda**		St. Thomas Aquinas College	Sparkill, New York	Active	
420	**Rho Mu**	1988	Elmira College	Elmira, New York	Active	
421	**Rho Nu**		Indiana University Bloomington	Bloomington, Indiana	Active	
422	Rho Xi				Inactive	
423	Rho Omicron				Inactive	
424	**Rho Pi**		Marywood University	Scranton, Pennsylvania	Active	
425	**Rho Rho**		University of Texas at Tyler	Tyler, Texas	Active	
426	**Rho Sigma**		Missouri Southern State University	Joplin, Missouri	Active	
427	**Rho Tau**		Malone University	Canton, Ohio	Active	
428	**Rho Upsilon**		Berry College	Mount Berry, Georgia	Active	
429	Rho Phi				Inactive	
430	**Rho Chi**	1990	Coastal Carolina University	Conway, South Carolina	Active	
431	Rho Psi				Inactive	
432	**Rho Omega**		Florida Atlantic University	Boca Raton, Florida	Active	
433	**Sigma Alpha**	May 1, 1990	Penn State Harrisburg	Middletown, Pennsylvania	Active	
434	Sigma Beta				Inactive	
435	Sigma Gamma				Inactive	
436	**Sigma Delta**		Linfield University	McMinnville, Oregon	Active	
437	**Sigma Epsilon**		Northeastern Illinois University	Chicago, Illinois	Active	
438	Sigma Zeta				Inactive	
439	Sigma Eta				Inactive	
440	**Sigma Theta**		Saint Xavier University	Chicago, Illinois	Active	
441	Sigma Iota				Inactive	
442	Sigma Kappa				Inactive	
443	Sigma Lambda				Inactive	
444	**Sigma Mu**		University at Albany, SUNY	Albany, New York	Active	
445	**Sigma Nu**		University of Maryland Eastern Shore	Princess Anne, Maryland	Active	
446	**Sigma Xi**		Madonna University	Livonia, Michigan	Active	
447	**Sigma Omicron**		University of Indianapolis	Indianapolis, Indiana	Active	
448	**Sigma Pi**		University of Holy Cross	New Orleans, Louisiana	Active	
449	Sigma Rho				Inactive	
450	Sigma Sigma				Inactive	
451	**Sigma Tau**	1992	Mount Saint Mary College	Newburgh, New York	Active	
452	**Sigma Upsilon**		Providence College	Providence, Rhode Island	Active	
453	Sigma Phi				Inactive	
454	**Sigma Chi**		University of Scranton	Scranton, Pennsylvania	Active	
455	**Sigma Psi**		University of West Alabama	Livingston, Alabama	Active	
456	**Sigma Omega**		West Virginia University at Parkersburg	Parkersburg, West Virginia	Active	
457	**Tau Alpha**		Grove City College	Grove City, Pennsylvania	Active	
458	**Tau Beta**		Southwestern University	Georgetown, Texas	Active	
459	**Tau Gamma**		Georgian Court University	Lakewood Township, New Jersey	Active	
460	**Tau Delta**	1991	Lyon College	Batesville, Arkansas	Active	
461	**Tau Epsilon**		University of Michigan	Ann Arbor, Michigan	Active	
462	**Tau Zeta**		Lincoln University	Philadelphia, Pennsylvania	Active	
463	**Tau Eta**		Brenau University	Gainesville, Georgia	Active	
465	Tau Theta				Inactive	
465	**Tau Iota**		Elizabethtown College	Elizabethtown, Pennsylvania	Active	
466	**Tau Kappa**		University of Mount Saint Vincent	Riverdale, Bronx, New York City, New York	Active	
467	**Tau Lambda**		Eastern University	St. Davids, Pennsylvania	Active	
468	Tau Mu				Inactive	
469	**Tau Nu**	May 7, 1993	Elmhurst University	Elmhurst, Illinois	Active	
470	**Tau Xi**		Methodist University	Fayetteville, North Carolina	Active	
471	**Tau Omicron**		Quincy University	Quincy, Illinois	Active	
472	**Tau Pi**		King's College	Wilkes-Barre, Pennsylvania	Active	
473	**Tau Rho**		Benedictine University	Lisle, Illinois	Active	
474	**Tau Sigma**		Kennesaw State University	Kennesaw, Georgia	Active	
475	**Tau Tau**		College of Charleston	Charleston, South Carolina	Active	
476	Tau Upsilon				Inactive	
477	**Tau Phi**		Lindenwood University	St. Charles, Missouri	Inactive	
478	**Tau Chi**		Lycoming College	Williamsport, Pennsylvania	Inactive	
479	Tau Psi				Inactive	
480	**Tau Omega**		Saint Joseph's University	Philadelphia, Pennsylvania	Active	
481	**Upsilon Alpha**		Avila University	Kansas City, Missouri	Active	
482	Upsilon Beta				Inactive	
483	**Upsilon Gamma**	1994	Canisius University	Buffalo, New York	Active	
484	Upsilon Delta				Inactive	
485	**Upsilon Epsilon**		Moravian University	Bethlehem, Pennsylvania	Active	
486	**Upsilon Zeta**		Taylor University	Upland, Indiana	Active	
487	**Upsilon Eta**	1994	Belmont Abbey College	Belmont, North Carolina	Active	
488	Upsilon Theta				Inactive	
489	Upsilon Iota				Inactive	
490	Upsilon Kappa				Inactive	
491	Upsilon Lambda				Inactive	
492	Upsilon Mu				Inactive	
493	Upsilon Nu				Inactive	
494	**Upsilon Xi**		Cameron University	Lawton, Oklahoma	Active	
495	**Upsilon Omicron**		Holy Family University	Philadelphia, Pennsylvania	Active	
496	Upsilon Pi				Inactive	
497	Upsilon Rho				Inactive	
498	**Upsilon Sigma**		Waynesburg University	Waynesburg, Pennsylvania	Active	
499	Upsilon Tau				Inactive	
500	**Upsilon Upsilon**		Salve Regina University	Newport, Rhode Island	Active	
501	**Upsilon Phi**		Mississippi State University, Meridian	Meridian, Mississippi	Active	
502	**Upsilon Chi**		University of Mobile	Mobile, Alabama	Active	
503	**Upsilon Psi**		Le Moyne College	Syracuse, New York	Active	
504	**Upsilon Omega**	1994	Cumberland University	Lebanon, Tennessee	Active	
505	**Phi Alpha**		Gwynedd Mercy University	Lower Gwynedd Township, Pennsylvania	Active	
506	Phi Beta				Inactive	
507	**Phi Gamma**		University of Findlay	Findlay, Ohio	Active	
508	Phi Delta				Inactive	
509	**Phi Epsilon**		University of North Carolina at Greensboro	Greensboro, North Carolina	Active	
510	**Phi Zeta**		Gannon University	Erie, Pennsylvania	Active	
511	Phi Eta				Inactive	
512	Phi Theta				Inactive	
513	Phi Iota				Inactive	
514	**Phi Kappa**		Thomas University	Thomasville, Georgia	Active	
515	**Phi Lambda**		Bluefield State University	Bluefield, West Virginia	Active	
516	**Phi Mu**		Gustavus Adolphus College	St. Peter, Minnesota	Active	
517	**Phi Nu**		University of South Carolina	Columbia, South Carolina	Active	
518	**Phi Xi**		Notre Dame of Maryland University	Baltimore, Maryland	Active	
519	**Phi Omicron**		Monmouth College	Monmouth, Illinois	Active	
520	**Phi Pi**		The Citadel	Charleston, South Carolina	Active	
521	**Phi Rho**		University of Arkansas at Monticello	Monticello, Arkansas	Active	
522	**Phi Sigma**		University of Portland	Portland, Oregon	Active	
523	**Phi Tau**		Southern Nazarene University	Bethany, Oklahoma	Active	
524	**Phi Upsilon**		Springfield College	Springfield, Massachusetts	Active	
525	**Phi Phi**		Wilkes University	Wilkes-Barre, Pennsylvania	Active	
526	Phi Chi				Inactive	
527	**Phi Psi**		Texas Wesleyan University	Fort Worth, Texas	Active	
528	**Phi Omega**		Santa Clara University	Santa Clara, California	Active	
529	Chi Alpha				Inactive	
530	**Chi Beta**		Chapman University	Orange, California	Active	
531	**Chi Gamma**		Widener University	Chester, Pennsylvania	Active	
532	**Chi Delta**		Lander University	Greenwood, South Carolina	Active	
533	**Chi Epsilon**		Molloy University	Rockville Centre, New York	Active	
534	**Chi Zeta**		University of North Carolina at Pembroke	Pembroke, North Carolina	Active	
535	**Chi Eta**		Otterbein University	Westerville, Ohio	Active	
536	**Chi Theta**		Campbell University	Buies Creek, North Carolina	Active	
537	**Chi Iota**		Maryville College	Maryville, Tennessee	Active	
538	Chi Kappa				Inactive	
539	**Chi Lambda**	1996	Loyola Marymount University	Los Angeles, California	Active	
540	**Chi Mu**	1997	McKendree University	Lebanon, Illinois	Active	
541	**Chi Nu**		Colorado Christian University	Lakewood, Colorado	Active	
542	**Chi Xi**		Tougaloo College	Jackson, Mississippi	Active	
543	**Chi Omicron**		Mount St. Joseph University	Cincinnati, Ohio	Active	
544	**Chi Pi**		Missouri Baptist University	St. Louis, Missouri	Active	
545	**Chi Rho**		Lynn University	Boca Raton, Florida	Active	
546	Chi Sigma				Inactive	
547	Chi Tau				Inactive	
548	Chi Upsilon				Inactive	
549	**Chi Phi**		Wilmington University	New Castle, Delaware	Active	
550	**Chi Chi**		Lubbock Christian University	Lubbock, Texas	Active	
551	**Chi Psi**		University of Maryland, Baltimore County	Baltimore, Maryland	Inactive	
552	Chi Omega				Inactive	
553	**Psi Alpha**		McDaniel College	Westminster, Maryland	Active	
554	**Psi Beta**		Susquehanna University	Selinsgrove, Pennsylvania	Active	
555	Psi Gamma				Inactive	
556	**Psi Delta**		Alaska Pacific University	Anchorage, Alaska	Inactive	
557	**Psi Epsilon**		Ohio University Regional Higher Education	Granville, Ohio	Active	
558	**Psi Zeta**	1997	Marietta College	Marietta, Ohio	Active	
559	Psi Eta				Inactive	
560	**Psi Theta**		Misericordia University	Dallas, Pennsylvania	Active	
561	**Psi Iota**		Saint Vincent College	Latrobe, Pennsylvania	Active	
562	Psi Kappa				Inactive	
563	Psi Lambda				Inactive	
564	**Psi Mu**		Greensboro College	Greensboro, North Carolina	Active	
565	**Psi Nu**		LaGrange College	LaGrange, Georgia	Active	
566	**Psi Xi**		University of South Carolina Aiken	Aiken, South Carolina	Active	
567	**Psi Omicron**		Stevenson University	Stevenson, Maryland	Active	
568	**Psi Pi**		University of Alabama in Huntsville	Huntsville, Alabama	Active	
569	**Psi Rho**		Flagler College	St. Augustine, Florida	Active	
570	Psi Sigma				Inactive	
571	**Psi Tau**		Franklin University	Columbus, Ohio	Active	
572	Psi Upsilon				Inactive	
573	**Psi Phi**		Columbia College	Columbia, Missouri	Active	
574	**Psi Chi**		Dominican University	River Forest, Illinois	Inactive	
575	**Psi Psi**	April 19, 1998	Rockhurst University	Kansas City, Missouri	Active	
576	**Psi Omega**		Thomas More University	Crestview Hills, Kentucky	Active	
577	Omega Alpha				Inactive	
578	**Omega Beta**		Mississippi Valley State University	Mississippi Valley State, Mississippi	Active	
579	**Omega Gamma**		University of North Georgia	Dahlonega, Georgia	Active	
580	Omega Delta				Inactive	
581	**Omega Epsilon**		Florida Gulf Coast University	Fort Myers, Florida	Active	
582	Omega Zeta				Inactive	
583	**Omega Eta**		Lenoir–Rhyne University	Hickory, North Carolina	Active	
584	**Omega Theta**		Nova Southeastern University	Davie, Florida	Active	
585	**Omega Iota**		University of Mount Union	Alliance, Ohio	Active	
586	Omega Kappa				Inactive	
587	**Omega Lambda**		Union University	Jackson, Tennessee	Active	
588	Omega Mu				Inactive	
589	Omega Nu				Inactive	
590	**Omega Xi**		Manhattanville University	Purchase, New York	Active	
591	**Omega Omicron**		Ottawa University	Ottawa, Kansas	Active	
592	**Omega Pi**		Buena Vista University	Storm Lake, Iowa	Active	
593	Omega Rho				Inactive	
594	**Omega Sigma**		Walsh University	North Canton, Ohio	Active	
595	**Omega Tau**		Pacific University	Forest Grove, Oregon	Active	
596	**Omega Upsilon**		Wayland Baptist University	Plainview, Texas	Active	
597	Omega Phi				Inactive	
598	**Omega Chi**		Cedar Crest College	Allentown, Pennsylvania	Active	
599	**Omega Psi**	2000	Huntington University	Huntington, Indiana	Active	
600	**Omega Omega**		Christian Brothers University	Memphis, Tennessee	Active	
601	Alpha Alpha Alpha				Inactive	
602	**Alpha Alpha Beta**		Niagara University	Lewiston, New York	Active	
603	**Alpha Alpha Gamma**		University of Illinois Springfield	Springfield, Illinois	Active	
604	**Alpha Alpha Delta**		Saint Peter's University	Jersey City, New Jersey	Active	
605	**Alpha Alpha Epsilon**		Fort Hays State University	Hays, Kansas	Active	
606	Alpha Alpha Zeta				Inactive	
607	Alpha Alpha Eta				Inactive	
608	**Alpha Alpha Theta**		Southern Arkansas University	Magnolia, Arkansas	Active	
609	**Alpha Alpha Iota**		Ferris State University	Big Rapids, Michigan	Active	
610	**Alpha Alpha Kappa**		Warner University	Lake Wales, Florida	Active	
611	**Alpha Alpha Lambda**		Hood College	Frederick, Maryland	Active	
612	**Alpha Alpha Mu**		Saint Elizabeth University	Morristown, New Jersey	Active	
613	Alpha Alpha Nu				Inactive	
614	Alpha Alpha Xi				Inactive	
615	**Alpha Alpha Omicron**		Illinois College	Jacksonville, Illinois	Active	
616	**Alpha Alpha Pi**		University of North Carolina Wilmington	Wilmington, North Carolina	Active	
617	Alpha Alpha Rho				Inactive	
618	**Alpha Alpha Sigma**		University of the Ozarks	Clarksville, Arkansas	Active	
619	**Alpha Alpha Tau**		Marian University	Indianapolis, Indiana	Active	
620	Alpha Alpha Upsilon				Inactive	
621	Alpha Alpha Phi				Inactive	
622	**Alpha Alpha Chi**		DeSales University	Center Valley, Pennsylvania	Active	
623	**Alpha Alpha Psi**		Camden County College	Blackwood, New Jersey	Active	
624	**Alpha Alpha Omega**		Muskingum University	New Concord, Ohio	Active	
625	**Alpha Beta Alpha**		Spring Hill College	Mobile, Alabama	Active	
626	**Alpha Beta Beta**		Saint Francis University	Loretto, Pennsylvania	Active	
627	Alpha Beta Gamma				Inactive	
628	**Alpha Beta Delta**		Marymount University	Arlington County, Virginia	Active	
629	**Alpha Beta Epsilon**		Aurora University	Aurora, Illinois	Active	
630	Alpha Beta Zeta				Inactive	
631	Alpha Beta Eta				Inactive	
632	**Alpha Beta Theta**	December 2003	Rider University	Lawrenceville, New Jersey	Active	
633	Alpha Beta Iota				Inactive	
634	**Alpha Beta Kappa**		Valdosta State University	Valdosta, Georgia	Active	
635	**Alpha Beta Lambda**		Oral Roberts University	Tulsa, Oklahoma	Active	
636	**Alpha Beta Mu**		Southeastern University	Lakeland, Florida	Active	
637	**Alpha Beta Nu**		Virginia Union University	Richmond, Virginia	Active	
638	Alpha Beta Xi				Inactive	
639	**Alpha Beta Omicron**		Salem College	Winston-Salem, North Carolina	Active	
640	**Alpha Beta Pi**		Mercyhurst University	Erie, Pennsylvania	Active	
641	**Alpha Beta Rho**	October 3, 2004	Dickinson College	Carlisle, Pennsylvania	Active	
642	**Alpha Beta Sigma**		Endicott College	Beverly, Massachusetts	Active	
643	Alpha Beta Tau				Inactive	
644	**Alpha Beta Upsilon**		Broward College	Fort Lauderdale, Florida	Active	
645	**Alpha Beta Phi**		William Jewell College	Liberty, Missouri	Active	
646	**Alpha Beta Chi**		Ohio Dominican University	Columbus, Ohio	Active	
647	**Alpha Beta Psi**		Indiana University Columbus	Columbus, Indiana	Active	
648	**Alpha Beta Omega**		University of Arkansas–Fort Smith	Fort Smith, Arkansas	Active	
649	Alpha Gamma Alpha				Inactive	
650	**Alpha Gamma Beta**		Stonehill College	Easton, Massachusetts	Active	
651	**Alpha Gamma Gamma**		University of Southern California	Los Angeles, California	Active	
652	Alpha Gamma Delta				Inactive	
653	**Alpha Gamma Epsilon**		Bellarmine University	Louisville, Kentucky	Active	
654	**Alpha Gamma Zeta**		Loyola University Maryland	Baltimore, Maryland	Active	
655	Alpha Gamma Eta				Inactive	
656	**Alpha Gamma Theta**		Clark Atlanta University	Atlanta, Georgia	Active	
657	**Alpha Gamma Iota**		Thiel College	Greenville, Pennsylvania	Active	
658	**Alpha Gamma Kappa**		Marist University	Poughkeepsie, New York	Active	
659	**Alpha Gamma Lambda**		Rowan College of South Jersey	Sewell, New Jersey	Active	
660	Alpha Gamma Mu				Inactive	
661	**Alpha Gamma Nu**		Millersville University of Pennsylvania	Millersville, Pennsylvania	Active	
662	**Alpha Gamma Xi**		Presbyterian College	Clinton, South Carolina	Active	
663	**Alpha Gamma Omicron**		St. John Fisher University	Pittsford, New York	Active	
664	**Alpha Gamma Pi**		Rockland Community College	Suffern, New York	Active	
665	Alpha Gamma Rho				Inactive	
666	**Alpha Gamma Sigma**	May 2006	Queensborough Community College	Bayside, Queens, New York City, New York	Active	
667	Alpha Gamma Tau				Inactive	
668	**Alpha Gamma Upsilon**		Virginia Wesleyan University	Virginia Beach, Virginia	Active	
669	**Alpha Gamma Phi**		St. Edward's University	Austin, Texas	Active	
670	Alpha Gamma Chi				Inactive	
671	**Alpha Gamma Psi**		Coker University	Hartsville, South Carolina	Active	
672	**Alpha Gamma Omega**		University of Tennessee Southern	Pulaski, Tennessee	Active	
673	**Alpha Delta Alpha**		Saint Leo University	St. Leo, Florida	Active	
674	Alpha Delta Beta				Inactive	
675	Alpha Delta Gamma				Inactive	
676	**Alpha Delta Delta**		North Central College	Naperville, Illinois	Active	
677	Alpha Delta Epsilon		National University, Arizona	Scottsdale, Arizona	Inactive	
678	**Alpha Delta Zeta**		Miami Dade College	Miami, Florida	Active	
679	Alpha Delta Eta				Inactive	
680	**Alpha Delta Theta**	April 28, 2002	Marian University	Fond du Lac, Wisconsin	Inactive	
681	Alpha Delta Iota				Inactive	
682	Alpha Delta Kappa				Inactive	
683	**Alpha Delta Lambda**		Coppin State University	Baltimore, Maryland	Active	
684	**Alpha Delta Mu**		Dalton State College	Dalton, Georgia	Active	
685	**Alpha Delta Nu**		Miles College	Fairfield, Alabama	Active	
686	**Alpha Delta Xi**		Ramapo College	Mahwah, New Jersey	Active	
687	**Alpha Delta Omicron**		Alma College	Alma, Michigan	Active	
688	Alpha Delta Pi				Inactive	
689	**Alpha Delta Rho**		Collin College	Plano, Texas	Active	
690	**Alpha Delta Sigma**		Huston–Tillotson University	Austin, Texas	Active	
691	Alpha Delta Tau				Inactive	
692	**Alpha Delta Upsilon**		University of the Cumberlands	Williamsburg, Kentucky	Active	
693	**Alpha Delta Phi**		Utica University	Utica, New York	Active	
694	**Alpha Delta Chi**		State University of New York at Plattsburgh, Queensbury Campus	Queensbury, New York	Active	
695	**Alpha Delta Psi**		Blue Mountain Christian University	Blue Mountain, Mississippi	Active	
696	**Alpha Delta Omega**		Texas A&M University–San Antonio	San Antonio, Texas	Inactive	
697	Alpha Epsilon Alpha				Inactive	
698	Alpha Epsilon Beta				Inactive	
699	**Alpha Epsilon Gamma**		Grand Canyon University	Phoenix, Arizona	Active	
752	**Alpha Kappa Eta**		Liberty University Online Graduate Chapter	Lynchburg, Virginia	Active	
762	University of the Southern Caribbean		University of the Southern Caribbean	Port of Spain, Trinidad and Tobago	Active	
800	Alpha Epsilon Delta				Inactive	
801	Alpha Epsilon Epsilon				Inactive	
802	**Alpha Epsilon Zeta**		Lehigh Carbon Community College	Schnecksville, Pennsylvania	Active	
803	**Alpha Epsilon Eta**		Tarrant County College Northeast Campus	Hurst, Texas	Active	
804	Alpha Epsilon Theta				Inactive	
805	**Alpha Epsilon Iota**		University of Saint Joseph	West Hartford, Connecticut	Active	
806	**Alpha Epsilon Kappa**		Western New Mexico University	Silver City, New Mexico	Active	
807	**Alpha Epsilon Lambda**		Chowan University	Murfreesboro, North Carolina	Active	
808	Alpha Epsilon Mu				Inactive	
809	**Alpha Epsilon Nu**		Albizu University, Miami Campus	Doral, Florida	Inactive	
810	**Alpha Epsilon Xi**		Walden University	Columbia, Maryland	Active	
811	**Alpha Epsilon Omicron**		Campbellsville University	Campbellsville, Kentucky	Active	
812	**Alpha Epsilon Pi**		Penn State Altoona	Altoona, Pennsylvania	Active	
813	**Alpha Epsilon Rho**		Indian River State College	Fort Pierce, Florida	Active	
814	**Alpha Epsilon Sigma**		Western Governors University	Glenside, Pennsylvania	Active	
815	**Alpha Epsilon Tau**		Nelson University	Waxahachie, Texas	Active	(Note: Chapter formed at Southwestern Assemblies of God University, now Nelson University.)
816	Alpha Epsilon Upsilon				Inactive	
817	**Alpha Epsilon Phi**		Ferrum College	Ferrum, Virginia	Active	
818	**Alpha Epsilon Chi**		Judson University	Elgin, Illinois	Active	
819	**Alpha Epsilon Psi**		Meredith College	Raleigh, North Carolina	Active	
820	**Alpha Epsilon Omega**		St. Joseph's University, Brooklyn Campus	Brooklyn, New York	Active	
821	Alpha Zeta Alpha		Averett University	Danville, Virginia	Active	
822	Alpha Zeta Beta				Inactive	
823	**Alpha Zeta Gamma**		Nevada State University	Henderson, Nevada	Active	
824	Alpha Zeta Delta				Inactive	
825	**Alpha Zeta Epsilon**		Thomas Edison State University	Trenton, New Jersey	Active	
826	**Alpha Zeta Zeta**		Tarrant County College South Campus	Fort Worth, Texas	Active	
827	Alpha Zeta Eta				Inactive	
828	**Alpha Zeta Theta**		Shorter University	Rome, Georgia	Active	
829	**Alpha Zeta Iota**		Xavier University of Louisiana	New Orleans, Louisiana	Active	
830	**Alpha Zeta Kappa**		Lourdes University	Sylvania, Ohio	Active	
831	**Alpha Zeta Lambda**		Texas A&M University–Victoria	Victoria, Texas	Active	
832	Alpha Zeta Mu				Inactive	
833	Alpha Zeta Nu				Inactive	
834	Alpha Zeta Xi				Inactive	
835	**Alpha Zeta Omicron**		Robert Morris University	Moon Township, Pennsylvania	Active	
836	**Alpha Zeta Pi**		Georgia Gwinnett College	Lawrenceville, Georgia	Active	
837	**Alpha Zeta Rho**		Felician University	Rutherford, New Jersey	Active	
838	Alpha Zeta Sigma				Inactive	
839	Alpha Zeta Tau		Lebanon Valley College	Annville, Pennsylvania	Active	
840	Alpha Zeta Upsilon				Inactive	
841	Alpha Zeta Phi				Inactive	
842	Alpha Zeta Chi				Inactive	
843	**Alpha Zeta Psi**		Pfeiffer University	Asheboro, North Carolina	Active	
844	**Alpha Zeta Omega**		Davis & Elkins College	Elkins, West Virginia	Active	
845	**Alpha Eta Alpha**		University of Massachusetts Dartmouth	Dartmouth, Massachusetts	Active	
846	**Alpha Eta Beta**		Daytona State College	Daytona Beach, Florida	Active	
847	**Alpha Eta Gamma**		University of Mary Hardin–Baylor	Belton, Texas	Active	
848	**Alpha Eta Delta**		Immaculata University	Immaculata, Pennsylvania	Active	
849	**Alpha Eta Epsilon**		Queens University of Charlotte	Charlotte, North Carolina	Active	
850	**Alpha Eta Zeta**		Dominican University New York	Orangeburg, New York	Active	
851	**Alpha Eta Eta**		North Central University	Minneapolis, Minnesota	Active	
852	**Alpha Eta Theta**		Bay Path University	Longmeadow, Massachusetts	Active	
853	**Alpha Eta Iota**		Neumann University	Aston, Pennsylvania	Active	
854	**Alpha Eta Kappa**		Merrimack College	North Andover, Massachusetts	Active	
855	**Alpha Eta Lambda**		Penn State Abington	Abington, Pennsylvania	Active	
856	**Alpha Eta Mu**		Saint Anselm College	Goffstown, New Hampshire	Active	
857	**Alpha Eta Nu**		Central Methodist University	Fayette, Missouri	Active	
858	Alpha Eta Xi				Inactive	
859	**Alpha Eta Omicron**		Northeastern State University, Broken Arrow Campus	Broken Arrow, Oklahoma	Active	
860	**Alpha Eta Pi**		Austin Community College	Austin, Texas	Active	
861	Alpha Eta Rho				Inactive	
862	**Alpha Eta Sigma**		Touro College	New York City, New York	Active	
863	**Alpha Eta Tau**		Atlanta Metropolitan State College	Atlanta, Georgia	Active	
864	**Alpha Eta Upsilon**		Clayton State University	Morrow, Georgia	Active	
865	**Alpha Eta Phi**		American Public University	Charles Town, West Virginia	Active	
866	**Alpha Eta Chi**		College of Wooster	Wooster, Ohio	Active	
867	**Alpha Eta Psi**		Oakland University	Rochester, New York	Active	
868	**Alpha Eta Omega**		John Brown University	Siloam Springs, Arkansas	Active	
869	**Alpha Theta Alpha**	2016	York College of Pennsylvania	Spring Garden Township, Pennsylvania	Active	
870	**Alpha Theta Beta**		College of DuPage	Glen Ellyn, Illinois	Active	
871	**Alpha Theta Gamma**	2016	Delaware Valley University	Doylestown, Pennsylvania	Active	
872	**Alpha Theta Delta**		North Park University	Chicago, Illinois	Active	
873	**Alpha Theta Epsilon**		University of Saint Francis	Fort Wayne, Indiana	Active	
874	**Alpha Theta Zeta**		Middlesex College	Edison, New Jersey	Active	
875	**Alpha Theta Eta**		University of Texas Permian Basin	Odessa, Texas	Active	
876	**Alpha Theta Theta**		College of Southern Maryland	La Plata, Maryland	Active	
877	Alpha Theta Iota				Inactive	
878	Alpha Theta Kappa				Inactive	
879	**Alpha Theta Lambda**		University of Hawaiʻi at West Oʻahu	Kapolei, Hawaii	Active	
880	Alpha Theta Mu				Inactive	
881	**Alpha Theta Nu**		University of California, Irvine	Irvine, California	Active	
882	**Alpha Theta Xi**		State University of New York at Old Westbury	Old Westbury, New York	Active	
883	**Alpha Theta Omicron**		Roberts Wesleyan University	Chili, New York	Active	
884	**Alpha Theta Pi**		Oakwood University	Huntsville, Alabama	Active	
885	**Alpha Theta Rho**		Regis College	Weston, Massachusetts	Active	
886	**Alpha Theta Sigma**		St. Andrews University	Laurinburg, North Carolina	Active	
887	**Alpha Theta Tau**		McPherson College	McPherson, Kansas	Active	
888	**Alpha Theta Upsilon**		University of Wisconsin–Madison	Madison, Wisconsin	Active	
889	**Alpha Theta Phi**		Drew University	Madison, New Jersey	Active	
890	**Alpha Theta Chi**		Drexel University	Philadelphia, Pennsylvania	Active	
891	**Alpha Theta Psi**		American College of Education	Indianapolis, Indiana	Active	
892	**Alpha Theta Omega**	2017	St. Joseph's University, Long Island Campus	Patchogue, New York	Active	
893	**Alpha Iota Alpha**		Governors State University	University Park, Illinois	Active	
894	**Alpha Iota Beta**		Norfolk State University	Norfolk, Virginia	Active	
895	Alpha Iota Gamma				Inactive	
896	**Alpha Iota Delta**		Syracuse University	Syracuse, New York	Active	
897	**Alpha Iota Epsilon**		University of South Dakota	Vermillion, South Dakota	Active	
898	**Alpha Iota Zeta**		Tusculum University	Tusculum, Tennessee	Active	
899	**Alpha Iota Eta**		Grand Valley State University	Allendale, Michigan	Active	
900	**Alpha Iota Theta**		Community College of Baltimore County	Baltimore, Maryland	Active	
901	**Alpha Iota Iota**		Milligan University	Milligan College, Tennessee	Active	
902	**Alpha Iota Kappa**		Converse University	Spartanburg, South Carolina	Active	
903	**Alpha Iota Lambda**		Concordia University, St. Paul	Saint Paul, Minnesota	Active	
904	**Alpha Iota Mu**		Middle Georgia State University	Macon, Georgia	Active	
905	**Alpha Iota Nu**		Lone Star College–CyFair	Cypress, Texas	Active	
906	**Alpha Iota Xi**		Ave Maria University	Ave Maria, Florida	Active	
907	**Alpha Iota Omicron**		Regent University	Virginia Beach, Virginia	Active	
908	**Alpha Iota Pi**		Charleston Southern University	North Charleston, South Carolina	Active	
909	**Alpha Iota Rho**		Hollins University	Hollins, Virginia	Active	
910	**Alpha Iota Sigma**		Ohio Christian University	Circleville, Ohio	Active	
911	**Alpha Iota Tau**		Xavier University	Cincinnati, Ohio	Active	
912	**Alpha Iota Upsilon**		Chesapeake College	Wye Mills, Maryland	Active	
913	**Alpha Iota Phi**		Westminster College	Fulton, Missouri	Active	
914	**Alpha Iota Chi**		Indiana University South Bend	South Bend, Indiana	Active	
915	**Alpha Iota Psi**		Alderson Broaddus University	Philippi, West Virginia	Active	
916	Alpha Iota Omega				Inactive	
917	**Alpha Kappa Alpha**		Sacred Heart University	Fairfield, Connecticut	Active	
918	**Alpha Kappa Beta**		Lewis University	Romeoville, Illinois	Active	
919	**Alpha Kappa Gamma**		Fairleigh Dickinson University	Madison, New Jersey	Active	
920	**Alpha Kappa Delta**		Relay Graduate School of Education	New York City, New York	Active	
921	**Alpha Kappa Epsilon**		New England College	Henniker, New Hampshire	Active	
922	**Alpha Kappa Zeta**		Chicago School of Professional Psychology	Chicago, Illinois	Active	
923	**Alpha Kappa Eta**		Capella University	Katy, Texas	Active	
923	**Alpha Kappa Theta**		Capella University	Minneapolis, Minnesota	Active	
924	**Alpha Kappa Iota**		American InterContinental University	Chandler, Arizona	Active	
925	Alpha Kappa Kappa				Inactive	
926	**Alpha Kappa Lambda**		Saint Leo University, Online Graduate School	Saint Leo, Florida	Active	
927	Alpha Kappa Mu				Inactive	
928	**Alpha Kappa Nu**		McNeese State University	Lake Charles, Louisiana	Active	
929	**Alpha Kappa Xi**		California Baptist University	Riverside, California	Active	
930	**Alpha Kappa Omicron**		University of the Incarnate Word	San Antonio, Texas	Active	
931	**Alpha Kappa Pi**		Criswell College	Dallas, Texas	Active	
932	**Alpha Kappa Rho**		Tennessee Wesleyan University	Athens, Tennessee	Active	
933	**Alpha Kappa Sigma**		Borough of Manhattan Community College	New York City, New York	Active	
934	**Alpha Kappa Tau**		University of the Southwest	Hobbs, New Mexico	Active	
935	Alpha Kappa Upsilon				Inactive	
936	**Alpha Kappa Phi**		Rivier University	Nashua, New Hampshire	Active	
937	**Alpha Kappa Chi**		Roger Williams University	Bristol, Rhode Island	Active	
938	**Alpha Kappa Psi**		Carlow University	Pittsburgh, Pennsylvania	Active	
939	**Alpha Kappa Omega**		Huntingdon College	Montgomery, Alabama	Active	
940	**Alpha Lambda Alpha**		Kansas Wesleyan University	Salina, Kansas	Active	
941	**Alpha Lambda Beta**		Rutgers University–Newark	Newark, New Jersey	Active	
942	**Alpha Lambda Gamma**		Colorado State University Pueblo	Pueblo, Colorado	Active	
943	**Alpha Lambda Delta**		Dallas College	Dallas, Texas	Active	
944	Alpha Lambda Epsilon				Inactive	
945	**Alpha Lambda Zeta**		Mount Aloysius College	Cresson, Pennsylvania	Active	
946	**Alpha Lambda Eta**		United States University	San Diego, California	Active	
947	**Alpha Lambda Theta**		Lincoln University	Jefferson City, Missouri	Active	
948	**Alpha Lambda Iota**		Oglala Lakota College	Kyle, South Dakota	Active	
949	**Alpha Lambda Kappa**		University of Alaska Southeast	Juneau, Alaska	Active	
950	**Alpha Lambda Lambda**		Lake Erie College	Painesville, Ohio	Active	
951	**Alpha Lambda Mu**		Alcorn State University	Natchez, Mississippi	Active	
952	**Alpha Lambda Nu**		Liberty University Online Undergraduate Chapter	Lynchburg, Virginia	Active	
953	**Alpha Lambda Xi**		Mary McLeod Bethune Day Academy Public Charter School	Washington, D.C.	Active	
	**Università degli Studi di Napoli Federico II**		University of Naples Federico II	Naples, Campania, Italy	Active	
9001	**University of Arizona Liaison Chapter**		University of Arizona	Tucson, Arizona	Active	
9002	**Trinity Christian College Liaison Chapter**		Trinity Christian College	Palos Heights, Illinois	Active	
9003	**Millsaps College Liaison Chapter**		Millsaps College	Jackson, Mississippi	Active	

== Professional, honorary, and alumni chapters ==
Following are Kappa Delta Pi's known professional, honorary, and alumni chapters. Active chapters are indicated in bold and inactive chapters are in italics.

Number	Chapter	Charter date and range	Location	Status	Ref.
	**Honorary Laureate Chapter**	February 1924		Active	
	Alpha Alumni	November 1926	Kansas City, Missouri	Inactive	
	Jacksonville Alumni Chapter	January 1935	Jacksonville, Florida	Inactive	
	Fort Worth Alumni Chapter	May 1936	Fort Worth, Texas	Inactive	
	Great Cincinnati Alumni Chapter		Cincinnati, Ohio	Inactive	
	Greater Cleveland Alumni Chapter		Cleveland, Ohio	Inactive	
	Greater Miami Alumni Chapter		Miami, Florida	Inactive	
	Gulf Coast Alumni Chapter		Panama City, Florida	Inactive	
	Nemaha Alumni Chapter		Omaha, Nebraska	Inactive	
	Pensacola Alumni Chapter		Pensacola, Florida	Inactive	
	Stark County Alumni Chapter		Canton, Ohio	Inactive	
	Tampa Bay Alumni Chapter		Tampa, Florida	Inactive	
720	**Tampa Bay Professional Chapter**		Tampa, Florida	Active	
747	**Tulane University Alumni Chapter**		Jackson, Mississippi	Active	
758	**Nigeria**		Ibadan, Oyo State, Nigeria	Active	
	**Eleanor Roosevelt Chapter**	2011		Active	(Note: Membership in this honorary recognition chapter is limited to 100 living members and is a lifetime appointment.)
