= Rande =

Rande may refer to:

== People ==
- Joep van de Rande, Dutch footballer
- Rande Gail Brown, writer, translator, and psychotherapist
- Rande Gerber, American businessman
- Rande Lazar, American otolaryngologist
- Rande Worthen, American politician

== Places and things ==
- Lange Rande, mountain in Switzerland
- Pedreira, Rande e Sernande, civil parish in Portugal
- Rande Bridge, cable-stayed bridge in Spain
