= Lloyd J. Richardson =

Sint Maarten politician (born 1950)

The Honourable Lloyd Richardson
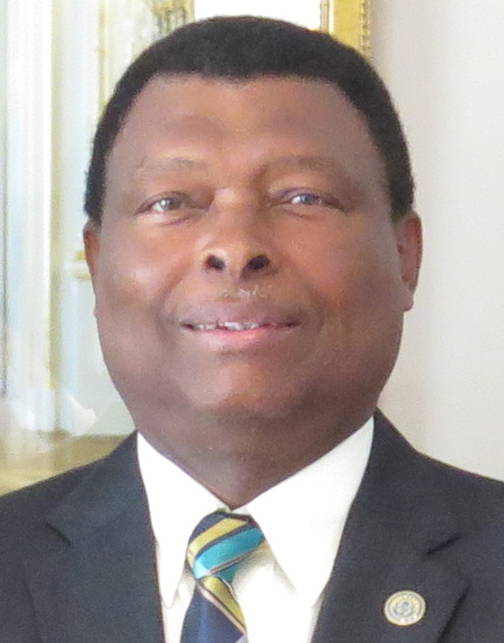

President of the Parliament of Sint Maarten
- In office 1 December 2014 – 12 October 2015
- Preceded by: Sarah Wescot-Williams
- Succeeded by: Sarah Wescot-Williams

Personal details
- Born: Lloyd Josiah Richardson; May 11, 1950 (age 76) St. Nicholas, Aruba
- Party: United People's Party
- Spouse: Dianne Forde (since 1983)
- Education: University of the Southern Caribbean; Andrews University; Universidad Autónoma de Guadalajara
- Occupation: Politician; Physician

Lloyd Josiah Richardson (born 11 May 1950) is a Sint Maarten politician of the United People's Party (UPP). He has been a member of Parliament since 10 October 2010, serving as President of Parliament from 1 December 2014 to 12 October 2015.

== History ==
Richardson was born on 11 May 1950 on Aruba to Josier A. Richardson and Barbara Richardson (née Alexander). As a child Richardson attended Irene Primary school in San Nicholas, Aruba. He received his associate degree in Liberal Arts at the University of the Southern Caribbean in Maracas Valley, Trinidad, his Bachelor of Science degree in chemistry at Andrews University in Berrien Springs, Michigan and his M.D. degree from the Universidad Autónoma de Guadalajara, in 1979.

In 1981, Richardson moved to Sint Maarten, and began working for Sint Maarten's leading healthcare provider SZV Social & Health Insurances as the first control physician. He held this position until his retirement in 2010.

In 2008 he received the Excellence Award for his role in the realisation of the local drug and alcohol rehabilitation centre Turning Point, an award given out annually by Philipsburg Mutual Improvement Association (PMIA). In 2014 the University of the Southern Caribbean awarded Richardson their Alumni Humanitarian Award.

Richardson has been married to Dianne Forde since 1983, the couple has three children.
