= Universidad Autónoma de Guadalajara =

University in Guadalajara, Mexico

- Motto: "Ciencia y Libertad" ("Science and Freedom)
- Type: Private
- Established: March 3, 1935; 91 years ago
- President: Antonio Leaño Reyes
- Students: 16,000
- Location: Av. Patria 1201; Col. Lomas del Valle 3ª Seccion, C.P. 45129, Guadalajara, Jalisco, Mexico; 20.6937°N 103.4163°W
- Campus: Urban, 2,000 acres (810 ha), distributed in 4 campuses
- Newspaper: Nexo Universitario, Alma Mater
- Colors
- Nickname: Tecos
- Sporting affiliations: CONCACAF Division 1A, 7 varsity teams
- Mascot: Owl
- Website: www.uag.mx

The Universidad Autónoma de Guadalajara (Spanish: [uniβeɾsiˈðað awˈtonoma ðe ɣwaðalaˈxaɾa], Autonomous University of Guadalajara), commonly abbreviated to UAG or Autónoma, is a coeducational, independent, private university based in the Mexican city of Guadalajara. Established in 1935, it was the first private university and medical school in Mexico. The creation of the university was a conservative response to a more-left wing direction being taken in Mexico in public higher education at the time. It was first conceived with the name Universidad del Occidente (University of the West), but would later be styled to Universidad Autónoma de Guadalajara (UAG).

Established University in the Community (UNICO) was the first community college in Mexico. It also operates an elementary school, two middle schools, and three high schools and postgraduate studies. The university has become one of the most important educational institutions in Latin America, attracting students from 25 different countries.

== History ==
=== Background ===
After the triumph of the Mexican Revolution (1910–1920) the governments that followed focused on making systemic changes to promote the goals of the revolution. On July 20, 1934, general Plutarco Elias Calles, a politician, revolutionary leader and former president, pronounced the speech known as "Grito de Guadalajara":

"Eternal enemies stalk her and try to make her triumphs nugatory. It is necessary that we enter the new period of the Revolution, which I call the psychological revolutionary period; we must seize the consciences of childhood, the consciences of youth because they are and must belong to the Revolution. It is absolutely necessary to get the enemy out of that trench where the clergy are, where the conservatives are; I mean school. It would be a very serious blunder, it would be criminal for the men of the Revolution, if we did not wrest the youth from the clutches of the clergy and from the clutches of the conservatives; and unfortunately the school in many states of the republic and in the capital itself is run by clerical and reactionary elements."

Articles 3 and 24 of the Constitution of Mexico enshrined respectively secular education and freedom of belief. They seriously restricted the influence of the Roman Catholic Church in Mexican education. In 1934, article 3 was amended to mandate a "socialist education" in public school.

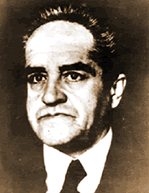
Antonio Caso

In 1933, Marxist and traditionalist factions in the National University were in conflict to determine the ideology of the university. On the conservative side, Antonio Caso, former university rector, argued under the banner of "academic freedom" that this freedom was essential to academic life and to the advancement of science and national leadership as stipulated in the Constitution of 1917. While Vicente Lombardo Toledano argued for a university of Marxist orientation.

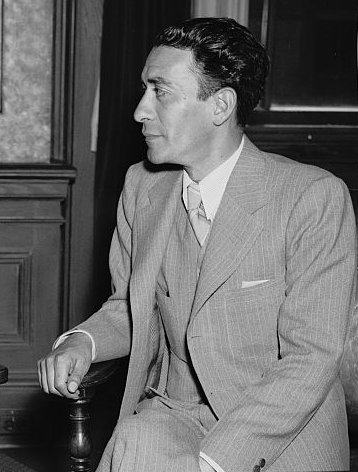
Vicente Lombardo Toledano

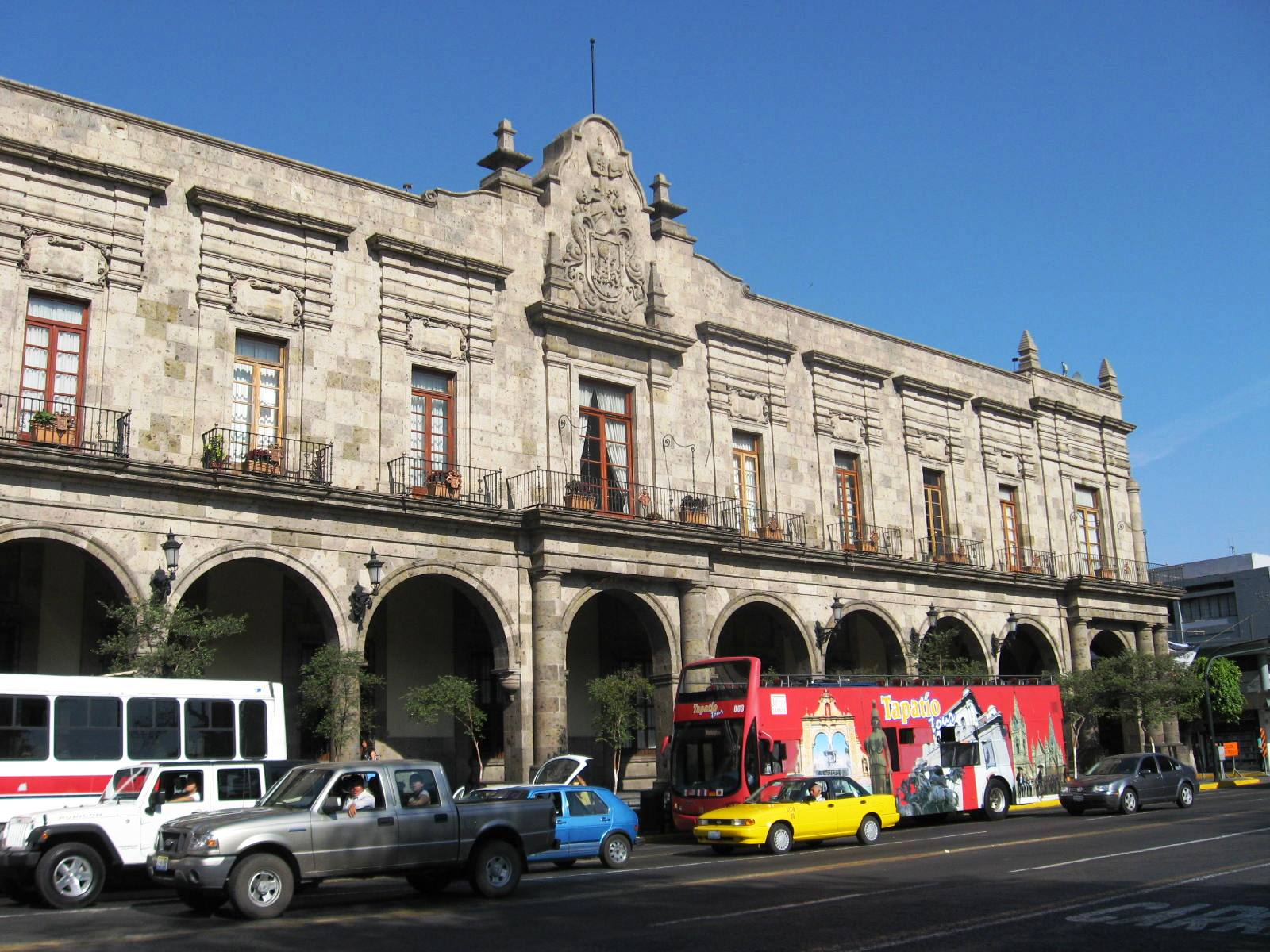
Government Palace of Guadalajara

The conflict culminated with the first Congress of Mexican Universities voting in 1933 for instituting a socialist orientation in the National University. The proponents of that model proceeded with efforts to implement it in other public universities throughout the nation, but were met with strikes in the University of Guadalajara. That led to multiple arrests and deaths and the closure of the school. The public university was reopened in 1935. The strikes ended when the governor of Jalisco, Everardo Topete, gave permission for the creation of the first private university in Mexico: Universidad Autonoma de Occidentes (University of the West), later renamed Universidad Autónoma de Guadalajara.

Nuñez building 28, was the first seat of the university. The founders started dividing the foundational tasks such as renting houses for schools and colleges, set curricula, organizing the team of teachers and initiate enrollment, while incorporating studies of the National Autonomous University of Mexico (UNAM).

=== First classes ===
The first dean of the Autonomous University of the West was the lawyer Agustin Navarro Flores, under whose leadership the first faculties were organized. On May 5, 1935, named Director of the School of Jurisprudence to Mr. Alberto G. Arce.; On May 15 were designated as Director and Secretary of the School of Medicine medical doctors Adolfo Esteban Saucedo and Cave Brambila; Dr. Agustin Hernandez was the first Director of Dentistry; the engineer Luis Ugarte was of Engineering and Professor Maria Villanueva assumed the leadership of the High School.

On April 21, 1956, the second dean of the UAG Dr. Fernando Banda, with the Lic. Manuel Calvillo, Director of Schools Incorporated, sent on behalf of Dr. Nabor Carrillo Flores, at that time Rector of the UNAM, the foundation stone of the University City, First Section, where there is now the Institute of Biological Sciences. From 1965 to 1973 the objectives of the first stage of the Master Plan were fully met. The Autonomous University City, whose construction had begun in 1968, was inaugurated on April 30, 1970, for the third dean Dr. Luis Garibay Gutierrez. In 1970 the Central Library building was completed, where technical processes are concentrated and simultaneously the School of Library. In 1972 the works of the Women's School educational complex were completed.

=== Completion of autonomy ===
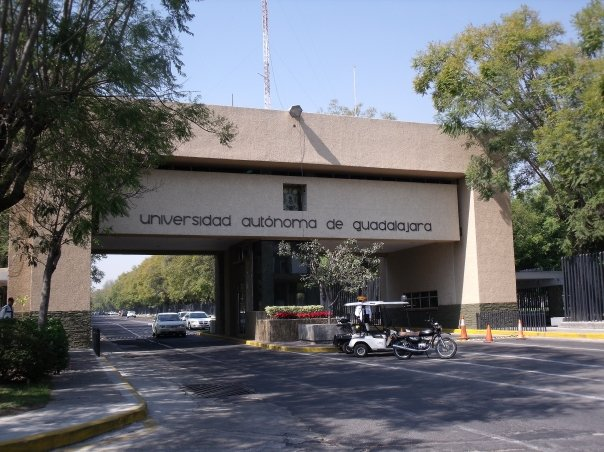
One of the main campus entrances

In 1991, the Mexican federal government issued the 158th Agreement which granted the university full academic independence and the right to award degrees in all levels of education. This agreement was made effective in July 26 of that year when it was published in the Official Gazette. The university sought and obtained support from other educational institutions in Mexico and in the international context, especially in Latin America and the United States. In the seventies and eighties, UAG expanded its network of cooperative agreements around the world, also playing a leading role in the founding and development of groups and international organizations such as the Latin American University Group for the Study and Improvement of Education (GULERPE) associations; Ajijic Center for the Improvement of Higher Education in America (CAMESA); the Instituto Ajijic on International Education (IASEI) and the council. Inter University for Economic and Social Development (CUIDES). In 1987 the International Association of University Presidents (IAUP), elected as its President Dean of the Autonomous University of Guadalajara. UAG plays a leading role in the IAUP and in several international educational organizations.

== Innovation ==
The school runs a program called "Strengthening Teachers", whose purpose is the academic aspects of the institution. This program includes the participation of professors and experts from other countries who, through short visits, participate in training programs at UAG. Teachers from UAG also provide the opportunity to participate in such programs, with sister universities in other countries.

=== Division of Continuing Education ===
The Division of Continuing Education of the Autonomous University of Guadalajara is a specialized developmental training program. Founded in 1972 is the Training Center with diversity and a number of courses. It is divided into four institutes: INDHEX, INDTECNO, IDEA, ICASA. It has five centers for the development of the institutions: EMPRENDE, CEPEP, EDUMALL, educational mission, on the job training.

== Medical School ==
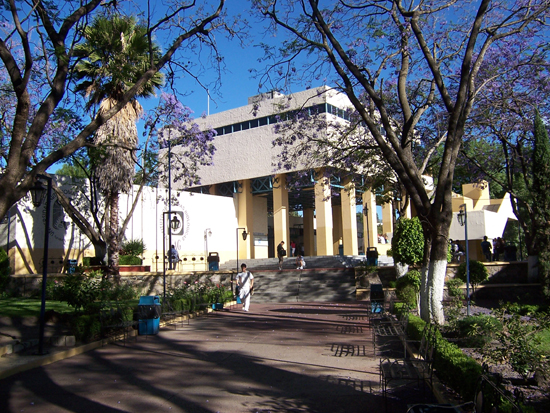
Institute of Biological Science, a far view of one of its auditoriums

It is the oldest private medical school in Mexico. The first class was taught on June 5, 1935, the same year of the school's birthdate, its first residency quarters were located on Tolsa Avenue (current Enrique Diaz de Leon Avenue) in Guadalajara, in an area donated by Ramón Garibay which later became the university's hospital. Later the hospital was named Hospital Ramón Garibay in honor of its patron.

In 1963, the basic science courses of the Medical School were moved to Lomas del Valle campus that houses the Institute of Biological Sciences. The clinical courses were in the Hospital Ramon Garibay. Later, in 1974, the second university hospital opened; This hospital is named after one of the most prominent founders of the university, Doctor Ángel Leaño, it was designed with specific requirements for different types of learning, offering new facilities for students during their clinical semesters. Doctor Ángel Leaño university hospital and Ramón Garibay University Hospital began the internship program and specialty residencies since 1970 in pediatrics, gynecology, obstetrics, anesthesiology and pneumology. Medical School currently offers training in ophthalmology, neurosurgery, psychiatry, ENT, orthopedics and dermatology. There are master's programs in health services administration, morphological sciences, physiology and health.

The UAG Faculty of Medicine has over 15,000 graduates practicing medicine in all 50 states of the US, in over 15 countries. The school has affiliation agreements and partnerships with a number of hospitals; in Mexico there are agreements with over 100 hospitals, and with other countries.

=== Medicine in the community program ===
Education program and community care started in 1955 as a project of multidisciplinary practices involving students and professors of medicine, architecture, dentistry, social work, psychology, nursing, law and chemistry for the purpose of helping poor communities. In 1973 it was formally established as the Medicine in the Community (PMC) program as part of a plan called Education in the Community, to support the actions of the Medical Brigade (WB) and the Mobile Hospital Disaster. In 1998 the Primary Care Mobile Unit (UMAP) was created which helped in the development of basic health within the concept of Medicine in the Community (PMC) program, the activities focused on community, education and welfare, allowing an adequate and varied exercise of medical education for the poor and sick.

=== Notable recognition and accreditation ===
It is approved for listing in the World Health Organization, World Directory of medical schools, United States Department of Education approval (title IV), recognized and approved by the government of Mexico to confer the degree of Physician Surgeon, accredited by the Mexican Council for the Accreditation of Medical Education (COMAEM) the U.S. Department of Education has determined that COMAEM's (Mexican Council for the Accreditation of Medical Education) is comparable to the LCME process, Mexican republic senate recognition, The Institute for International Medical Education (IIME), Mexican Federal Secretary of Public Education (SEP),National Committee on Foreign Medical Education and Accreditation (NCFMEA), Educational Commission for Foreign Medical Graduates (ECFMG), Consejo para la Acreditación de la Educación Superior (COPAES), Foundation for Advancement of International Medical Education and Research (FAIMER) and others.

According to the 2018 Federation of State Medical Boards survey, the Universidad Autónoma de Guadalajara is one of the three international medical schools with the largest number of licensed physicians (5,742) in the United States of America (with St. George's University School of Medicine and Ross University School of Medicine).

== School of Journalism ==
In 1970 the School of Journalism was created and was later expanded to Communication Sciences. It began shortly to publish its own newspaper, Eight Columns, written and published by students. The emergence of other newspapers, existing academic and student publications and expansion of the school, led to the creation of the Center of Communication University (CECUN) in 1977. In 1978 Eight Columns became a daily public distribution that reached the state of Jalisco and had an average of 48,000 copies and 80 pages per day.

The Communications and Development coordinates corporate communication to the media and publishing activities of the different schools and universities, teachers and student facilities.

The Nexus newspaper and the magazine Alma Mater, dedicated to university graduates and their families, and the academic publication Teaching, which is circulated in Latin America and is an instrument of international organizations such as GULERPE, CAMESA and IASEI, in the areas of health and news, are also published. The university press publishes several dozen titles a year intended for educational, cultural or research purposes, with internal circulation.

== UNICO ==
University in the Community (UNICO) is an institution of higher education that is part of the Autonomous University of Guadalajara since 1992, inspired by the community colleges in the United States. The key features of UNICO are short courses that correspond according to the regulatory legal framework of the Secretaria de Educacion Publica (SEP). Graduates who satisfactorily meet the established academic requirements obtain a Certificate of Study and a Title issued by the Autonomous University of Guadalajara, and a Professional Certificate issued by Secretaria de Educacion Publica (SEP) with official recognition and coverage for exercise throughout the country.

== Stadium ==
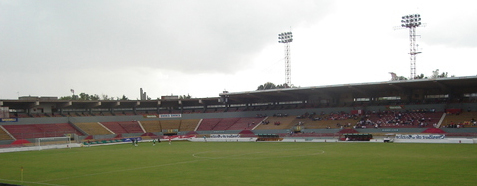
Estadio 3 de Marzo

Tecos F.C. and other athletic programs play their home games at the Estadio Tres de Marzo which is located in Zapopan, Jalisco. It has a capacity of 30,015. The steel stands were prefabricated and had a capacity of around 3,000 people. By virtue of UAG ascending to the second level of Mexican football in 1973 and according to a ruling from the Federación Mexicana de Fútbol Asociación, new concrete stands were constructed on the sides of the pitch. This brought the stadium capacity to 15,000 people, the minimum forum for a second division stadium. In 1975, after the Tecos de la UAG ascended to the Primera División de Mexico, the stands were once again remodeled in order to meet the minimum demands of the division which was 25,000 people.

The stadium once again went through renovation in order to accommodate the 1986 World Cup which brought the capacity to 30,015 people after new standing room areas were created.

In 1999, Estadio Tres de Marzo underwent its last major renovation which included improvements such as a new pitch and drainage system. The stadium earned its name from the founding date of the Universidad Autónoma de Guadalajara, on March 3, 1935.

== Sports ==
=== Soccer ===
The school's professional soccer team is named Tecos after the university symbol, the Tecolote, which is a word for "owl" in Spanish, and which is derived from the Nahuatl word for owl, tecolotl. The team plays in Estadio Tres de Marzo.

The university was founded in 1935 and soon had a team to play amateur soccer until 1971 when they joined Federacion Mexicana de Futbol. They gained promotion to Liga de Ascenso in their second season after beating La Piedad 4–0 under the management of Guillermo Sepulveda. Two years later, in the 1974–1975 season, they were promoted to Primera División Mexicana by beating Irapuato in a promotion game under the management of Everardo Villaseñor.

Previously named Club de Fútbol U.A.G., Estudiantes have won the national championship once and are the only team in Mexican football history to ascend from the two lower divisions and get the championship.

In 2009, the name of the UAG soccer team changed to Estudiantes.

== UAG popular culture references ==
- In Chicago Med, the character Dr. Connor Rhodes is a trauma surgery fellow. His past is somewhat murky, and he spent some time in Riyadh following his residency. In an episode it is revealed that he studied at UAG.

== Notable alumni ==
- Sofía Aragón - Mexicana Universal 2019
- Rande Lazar - pediatric otolaryngologist and philanthropist
- Gary Steven Krist, kidnapper and later physician
- Durell Peaden MD - American politician, ex-Senator for Florida
- Lloyd Richardson - Former President of the Parliament of Sint Maarten, 2014–2015
- Mauricio Toussaint - Artist

== See also ==
- Los TECOS
