= The Switch (TV series) =

2016 Canadian television sitcom

- Genre: Comedy
- Written by: Amy Fox; Wren Handman; Shevon Singh
- Directed by: Jem Garrard
- Starring: Nyla Rose; Amy Fox; Andrea Menard
- Opening theme: "Tear Down the Wall" by Kieran Strange
- Country of origin: Canada
- Original language: English
- No. of seasons: 1
- No. of episodes: 6

Production
- Producers: Amy Fox, Ingo Lou
- Production locations: Vancouver, British Columbia
- Production company: The Trembling Void High Deaf Productions

Original release
- Network: OutTV
- Release: July 25 – August 22, 2016

The Switch is a Canadian television comedy series, which debuted on OutTV in 2016. The series, the first transgender-themed television series produced in Canada, stars Nyla Rose as Sü, an IT manager who comes out as a trans woman, and is forced to rebuild her life after losing her job and her apartment as a result of her announcement.

The series originally had American trans actress Domaine Javier starring as Sü. According to the show’s creators, Javier blew everyone away with her audition after submitting via an open casting call. Javier was officially cast and filmed the first official teaser trailer in Canada in 2012. But due to certain changes within the Canadian conservative government at the time, the local actor’s union making it nearly impossible to work with paid actors from outside the country, and Javier’s nursing education, the production had no choice but to recast the role.

The role was subsequently recast and Julie Vu was slated to star as Sü, but she was dropped from the production in 2014 and the role was recast once again.

The show's cast also includes Amy Fox, Vincent Viezzer, Lindsay Coryne, Andrea Menard, Kent S. Leung, Chance Kingsmyth and Raugi Yu.

== Plot ==
The Switch tells the story of Sü, a Native American programmer who moves to Canada in order to transition from male to female without judgment from her previous community. But in quick succession, she is fired for coming out as a transgender woman, loses her apartment to demolition, and ends up sleeping on the couch of an old ex, Chris. Sü finds a new job with a snarky trans coworker, Phil, and avoids deportation.

Chris, meanwhile, is an eco-terrorist who assassinates oil lobbyists for profit with the help of their abrasive landlord Antonia, who has a vested interest in keeping Su from discovering what they actually do. This situation is complicated by the fact that a homicide detective named Sandra lives next door to Chris, and is deeply suspicious of them. Sandra's own godchild and ward, Zoey, is also trans and becoming more and more enmeshed in Chris and Sü's life.

As the show progresses, the characters manage to find community and acceptance from each other if not the rest of the world.

== Cast ==
- Nyla Rose as Sü:

Sü is smart, nerdy, reckless—she has a thousand ideas, and the only way to tell the good ones from the bad is to try them out, hope for the best, and then awkwardly apologize to anyone caught in the blast area. Sü has been out to herself for years, and moved to Vancouver from South Carolina to build her career as a computer programmer and finally live as a woman. When Sü moves in with Chris, her new world and friends challenge her old assumptions. As her community is threatened, she can no longer stand idly by: an office climber becomes a community leader.

- Amy Fox as Chris:

Chris is the last ex Sü calls in her hour of need, Chris is Sü's reluctant roommate. Ze's an exile from the northern rural interior, displaced by a mix of transphobia and a ruined economy. Ze met Antonia at the Eris Organics vegetable delivery co-op... which led them into their current scheme of killing climate criminals and selling the carbon offsets. A hospitable hermit, someone who can find or fix anything - except human connection. While, ze's a good friend you can always count on.

- Vincent Viezzer as Zoey:

Zoey is a perpetual outsider eager to be accepted. But once the popular kids look past Zoey's oddness and gender variance, what they find underneath is a morbid weirdo. An athletic savant with poor social skills, they come on strong, having discarded any sense of other people's privacy. Their birth mother died in a car accident three years ago, leaving them in care of their godmother, Sandra. Zoey craves the intimacy of friendship, but has only found online acquaintances. They have Chris (and now Sü).

- Lindsay Coryne as Antonia:

Antonia comes across as a butch lesbian who would be great as a buddy and terrifying as an enemy. She is suspicious of Sü and comes across as rude much of the time. She has a reputation as the finest lover in the lesbian community and is Chris’ boss and landlord.

- Andrea Menard as Sandra:

A homicide detective who never needed anything other than a mattress, toothbrush, and coffee-maker, now thrown into the role of Reluctant Parent for Zoey. Sandra was honoured when her best friend, Zoey's mom, asked her to be godparent to her child. Of course, she assumed that “godparent” was a purely honorary title. Which it was – until Zoey's mom died. Still, she does her best to give Zoey would a safe place to grow up. Of course, she never realized that Craneview Place isn't exactly “safe.” As a cop, Sandra's always on Chris’ tail in one way or another.

- Kent Leung as Russell:

Sü's love interest, a loan officer with plans for a stable career, elegant house, and a wife (who is deeply-closeted and transgender) to complete the package.

- Chance Kingsmyth as Phil:

Phil is one of Sü's new coworkers at Atlantis. Having transitioned from female to be a gay man, he is trying to fit into the affluent club scene by being catty and generally unpleasant. Sick of people not liking him for reasons beyond his control, Phil has decided to give people clear and specific reasons to hate him and boy, it feels great.

- Raugi Yo as Nate:

Sü and Phil's friendly, incompetent, and awkwardly-insecure boss at Atlantis. Every one of his subordinates has either quit or been promoted over his head, which only makes him cling harder to his increasingly resentful staff. His desperation to be “hip” and “easygoing” interferes with his daily social interactions.

- Gigi Saul Guerrero as Isabelle:

Isabelle is Antonia's seriously dysfunctional, Wednesday Addams-like cousin. Turns out she and Chris have two interests in common: women and their choice of careers. The two meet in a rough contact sport and hit it off immediately.

== Production ==
The series is produced in Vancouver, British Columbia by Trembling Void Studios, a firm headed by writer, producer and actress Amy Fox.

The series was originally planned to air as a web series, but was picked up for broadcast by OutTV, which aired the pilot as a one-off special in February 2014.

The show's production company subsequently conducted a crowdfunding campaign on Kickstarter to fund the production of further episodes, and reached its $50,000 goal in July 2014.
