= Rande Lazar =

American otolaryngologist

Rande H. Lazar is an American otolaryngologist with a primary focus in pediatrics.

== Education and career ==
Lazar received his B.A. in 1973 from Brooklyn College and his M.D. in 1978 from Universidad Autonoma de Guadalajara. He was a resident at the Department of General Surgery, North Shore University Hospital and the Cleveland Clinic Foundation, where he became Chief Resident in the Department of Otolaryngology and Communicative Disorders. He was licensed in 1985 by the State of Tennessee and obtained certification in 1984 from the American Board of Otolaryngology for Head and Neck Surgery and in 2005 from the American Board of Disability Analysts.

Lazar was Director of the Pediatric Otolaryngology Fellowship Training Program for ENT Memphis at Le Bonheur Children's Medical Center.

Lazar established a yearly grant for gathering socio-economic data related to otolaryngology.

Lazar was arrested in 2025 for allegedly stealing from TennCare.

== Research ==
He has published more than 40 peer-reviewed papers. According to Scopus, the 5 most highly cited are:

- Lazar RH, Younis RT, Long TE (January 1993). "Functional endonasal sinus surgery in adults and children". The Laryngoscope. 103 (1 Pt 1): 1–5. doi:10.1288/00005537-199301000-00001. PMID 8421410. Cited 53 times.
- Gross CW, Gurucharri MJ, Lazar RH, Long TE (March 1989). "Functional endonasal sinus surgery (FESS) in the pediatric age group". The Laryngoscope. 99 (3): 272–5. doi:10.1288/00005537-198903000-00007. PMID 2918799. S2CID 21402467. Cited 51 times.
- Linden BE, Gross CW, Long TE, Lazar RH (February 1990). "Morbidity in pediatric tonsillectomy". The Laryngoscope. 100 (2 Pt 1): 120–4. doi:10.1288/00005537-199002000-00002. PMID 2299950. S2CID 45676901. Cited 47 times.
- Lazar RH, Younis RT, Gross CW (1992). "Pediatric functional endonasal sinus surgery: review of 210 cases". Head & Neck. 14 (2): 92–8. doi:10.1002/hed.2880140203. PMID 1601655. S2CID 43244677. Cited 46 times.
- Lazar RH, Younis RT (May 1995). "Transnasal repair of choanal atresia using telescopes". Archives of Otolaryngology–Head & Neck Surgery. 121 (5): 517–20. doi:10.1001/archotol.1995.01890050015003. PMID 7727084. Cited 45 times.

== Honors and awards ==
1. Award of Honor, The Academy of Otolaryngology–Head and Neck Surgery, September, 1991
2. Physician Recognition Award, American Medical Association
3. Rande H. Lazar, M.D. Cleveland Clinic Lectureship
