= Maracas Valley =

Valley in Trinidad

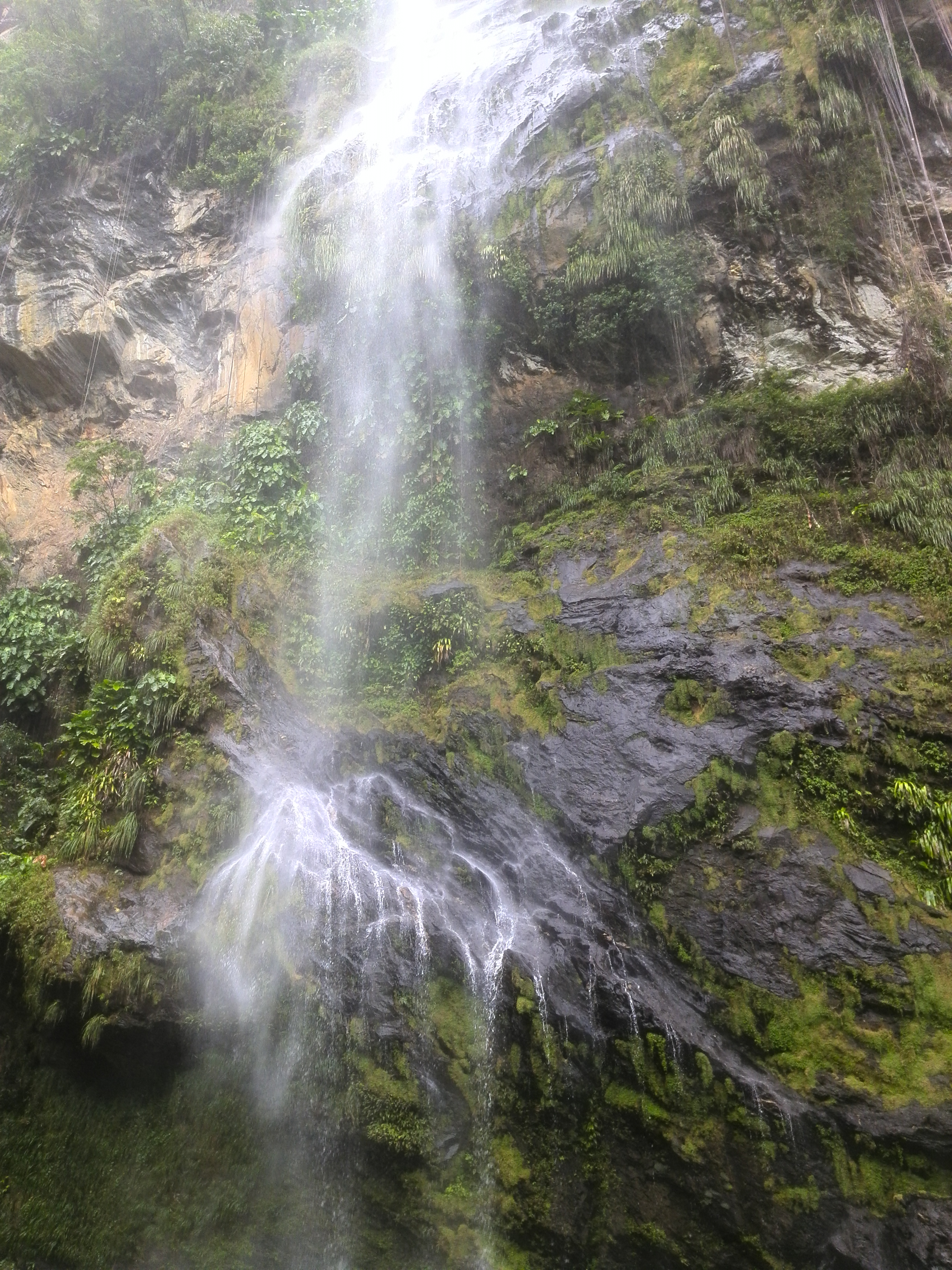
Maracas Falls

Maracas Valley is a valley in Trinidad that is separated by two mountains between Maracas–Saint Joseph and Maracas Beach.

Maracas valley is part of the biodiverse Northern Range mountain range. The region was once inhabited by the Amerindians. There is a rock outcrop that features petroglyphs created by the valley's earliest inhabitants. Historically, the Maracas valley had often attracted many settlers, due to its cool climate and well-watered soil. Cocoa and coffee plantations were established. During the peak of the Great Depression, the valley's agrarian society supported the nation's economy, which was based on agriculture at that time.

The valley is home to the nation's tallest waterfall, Maracas Falls, which towers over the valley with a height of 91.5 meters (300 ft) and is the source of the Maracas River, which provides water for the surrounding communities. It is also the location of the main campus for the Seventh Day Adventist University of the Southern Caribbean. Trinidad's second highest mountain peak, El Tucuche, towers over the lush valley and bounds it to the north. Due to this geographic location, the valley is usually cool, compared to the Caroni Plains and other surrounding lowlands. Being one of Trinidad's major watersheds, the Maracas valley is under serious threat from deforestation and human development.

== Conservation efforts ==
The Maracas Valley Action Committee (MVAC) was formed in 2002 due to resident concerns about slash-and-burn farming damaging the valley. Residents have protested the opening of a quarry in the valley due to concerns of deforestation, water pollution, and habitat destruction for birds and wildlife.
