= United States University =

For-profit university in San Diego, California, US

- Former name: InterAmerican College (1997–2010)
- Motto: Making College Affordable
- Type: Private for-profit university
- Established: 1997
- Parent institution: Aspen Group
- President: Scott W. M. Burrus
- Provost: Jennifer K. Billingsley
- Administrative staff: 50
- Students: 1,650 (Summer 2015)
- Location: San Diego, California, United States; 32.7609°N 117.1614°W
- Campus: Urban
- Colors: Red and blue
- Website: Official website
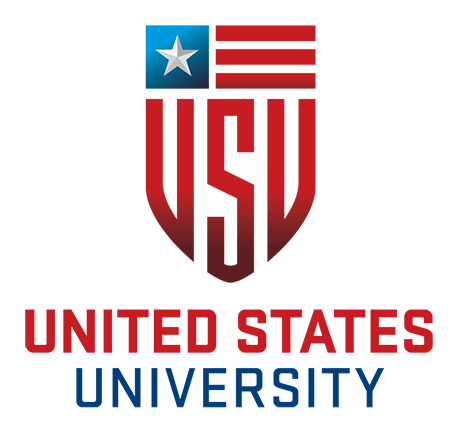

United States University (USU) is a private for-profit university in San Diego, California. It offers graduate and undergraduate degrees in health sciences, business, and nursing as well as California Teaching Credentials. It is owned by the Aspen Group, Inc., a publicly held, for-profit post-secondary education company headquartered in New York City.

== History ==
USU was founded in 1997 as InterAmerican College by Reymundo and Maria Marin, as a non-profit college geared to help immigrants transfer degrees. Foreign college transcripts would be evaluated by an independent panel that would appraise course work and give the student credit for up to three years of college course work. There would then be one-month courses on weeknights and weekends to complete any remaining requirements for an American degree. This early focus on immigrant education garnered positive press such as a 1999 Associated Press article and a 2002 San Diego Union-Tribune article.

In its first eight years InterAmerican College was initially dedicated to educating future bilingual teachers. The California Commission on Teacher Credentialing granted the institution the initial accreditation and approved the liberal studies program as well as the multiple and single subject credential programs. The United States University nursing program has increased in popularity in comparison to the additionally offered teaching programs.

In 2010, the institution changed its name to United States University to reflect the new status of university granted to the college. This name change was initiated by the new leadership team which took the reins in early 2010. Dr. Yoram Neumann, previously the vice president for academic affairs at California State University, Dominguez Hills, and the president, CEO, and founder of TUI University, was appointed president of USU.

During its June 18, 2014 meeting, the Structural Change Committee of the WASC Senior College and University Commission (WSCUC) granted United States University (USU) approval for a change of ownership from Educacion Significativa, LLC, to Linden, LLC.

In 2016, United States University moved their campus from Chula Vista, California, to Mission Valley.

In June 2017, monthly payment plans (MPP) were introduced for five of its programs as a financially manageable alternative to help students fund their education with minimal student loan debt. New, lowered tuition rates were announced for many existing programs.

On December 1, 2017, Aspen Group, Inc. (Nasdaq: ASPU), a post-secondary education company, announced the completion of their acquisition of United States University.

== Accreditation ==
United States University is accredited by the WASC Senior College and University Commission. The teaching credential programs are accredited by the California Commission on Teacher Credentialing. The Nurse Practitioner Programs are approved by the California Board of Registered Nursing. The Master of Science in Nursing is accredited by the Commission on Collegiate Nursing Education.

== Branch campus ==
- Mission Valley, California
