= University of the Southern Caribbean =

University in Port of Spain, Trinidad and Tobago

Coordinates: 10.6935°N 61.4076°W

- Former names: Caribbean Union College (1956-2006), Caribbean Training College (1929-1956), East Caribbean Training School (1927-1929)
- Motto: Beyond Excellence
- Type: Private
- Established: 1927
- President: Colwick Wilson
- Students: 3,500
- Location: Maracas Valley, Trinidad and Tobago
- Campus: 384 acres (1.55 km^{2})
- Colors: Green & Gold
- Website: www.usc.edu.tt

The University of the Southern Caribbean (USC) is a private university owned and operated by the Caribbean Union Conference of Seventh-day Adventists. The main campus is located on 384 acres (1.55 km^{2}) of land in the Maracas Valley on the island of Trinidad of the Republic of Trinidad and Tobago. There are also six satellite extension campuses located in Scarborough, Trinidad and Tobago; San Fernando, Trinidad and Tobago; Georgetown, Guyana; Bridgetown, Barbados; Castries, St. Lucia; and St. John's, Antigua and Barbuda. One other satellite campus is in the planning for St. George's, Grenada.

The University offers courses to foster values-based education. The curriculum not only focuses on the academic, but has a holistic emphasis—an education that attends to the mind, soul, and body.

It is a part of the Seventh-day Adventist education system, the world's second largest Christian school system.

== History ==
The University of the Southern Caribbean was founded in 1927 as East Caribbean Training School, for the purpose of educating the youth of the Caribbean Union Conference of Seventh-day Adventists. Two years later, it became Caribbean Training College. In 1945 the college developed a college preparatory instructional programme and in 1947, Caribbean Training College was official declared a junior college, offering two-year post-secondary certificates in theology, teacher training, and business and secretarial science. In 1956, Caribbean Training College changed its name to Caribbean Union College.

In September 1970, an academic extension was added at the University of the Southern Caribbean. The two-year junior college programme in theology was extended to a four-year programme, leading to the Bachelor of Theology degree. Subsequent changes included the conferring since 1985, of Bachelor of Arts, Bachelor of Science, Bachelor of Business Administration, and associate degrees in a wide range of disciplines in affiliation with Andrews University.

USC continues to make significant improvements in faculty, staff, instructional programmes, equipment, and facilities. The library, the academic centre of the University, had its space doubled when the former chapel was converted into additional library space. New features in the library include an audio-visual room, a juvenile reading room, discussion and conference rooms, and a computerized system. The current holdings total approximately 40,000 volumes, besides microfiche, and bound and unbound periodicals. The library has a growth rate of one thousand volumes a year. Study and research are indeed paramount in the institution. There are over 4,000 books, mostly references, in the Simmons’s Collection.

The Science Building accommodates the sciences, computer science and home economics. Other buildings include the Administrative/Press Building, which houses administrative, instructional, and other functions; the ladies worship room, the elementary school, and secondary school, the technology building, the three-story 'New Building'(as is named) and new prefab buildings. The former Press Building accommodates the executive offices, and some classrooms and computer instruction facilities.

== Campus ==
The University main campus is located on 384 acres (1.55 km^{2}) of land. It is located about 3 kilometers away from Trinidad’s first town, St. Joseph and just 16 kilometers north-east of Port of Spain, the capital city.

The ambience of the university campus is often described as friendly and good for a relaxed education. The university provides various facilities for students such as: mini-market, health center, computer labs, cafes and an array of sporting facilities such as lawn tennis, basketball, volleyball, football, cricket and gym facilities.

== Organization and administration ==
University Administration

1. Colwick Wilson, President
2. Wanda Chesney, Associate Provost
3. Emily Francois-Mark, VP for Financial Administration (Ag.)
4. Onesi La Fleur, VP for Student Development and Services
5. Terry John, VP for Spiritual Development/Church Pastor

== Academics ==
USC espouses the philosophy of the Seventh-day Adventist Church. It teaches that true education is the harmonious development of the head, the heart, and the hand. Excellence in teaching, scholarship, research activities, educational innovations, and dedication to the principles of Christian education rank high within the value system of the institution. USC views truth as coming from God, as an expression of the nature of God, and the Bible, as a divine frame of reference which encompasses all truth.

=== Academic programs ===
The university consists of five academic schools offering undergraduate and graduate programs.

- School of Education and Human Sciences
- School of Humanities
- School of Business
- School of Science & Technology
- School of Social Sciences
- School of Theology & Religion

Graduate and Undergraduate programs of study:

==== Graduate programmes ====
- Master of Business Administration
- in Human Resource Management
- in Health Care Administration
- in Economics and Finance
- in Finance and Accounting
- in Marketing
- Master of Arts in Counseling Psychology
- Master of Arts in Curriculum & Instruction
- Master of Arts in Educational Psychology
- Master of Arts in Educational Administration and Leadership
- Master of Arts in Human Communication
- Master of Arts in Pastoral Theology

==== Undergraduate programmes ====
- Bachelor of Science in Accounting
- Bachelor of Science in Business Education
- Bachelor of Science in Accounting
- Bachelor of Business Administration in Marketing
- Bachelor of Business Administration in Human Resource Management
- Bachelor of Business Administration in Hospitality and Tourism Management
- Bachelor of Business Administration in Management
- Bachelor of Business Administration in Management
- Bachelor of Business Administration in Finance
- Bachelor of Arts Religion
- Bachelor of Arts in Theology- Health/Pastoral/Youth Ministry
- Bachelor of Science in Criminology and Criminal Justice.
- Bachelor of Science in Educational Service
- Bachelor of Science in Secondary School Teacher Prep.
- Bachelor of Science in Elementary Education
- Bachelor of Science in Family & Consumer Science
- Bachelor of Science in Behavioral Sciences
- Bachelor of Science in Psychology
- Bachelor of Science in Social Work
- Bachelor of Science in Biology
- Bachelor of Science in Nursing
- Bachelor of Science in Computing (Software Systems Emphasis)
- Bachelor of Arts English
- Bachelor of Arts History
- Bachelor of Arts in Music (Music Education Emphasis)
- Bachelor of Science in Social Studies

==== Associate degrees ====
- Associate of Arts in Music
- Associate of Science General Business Emphasis
- Associate of Science Office Technology
- Associate of Science in Computer Information Systems

==== Certificates/diplomas ====
- Diploma - English as a Second Language
- Postgraduate Diploma for Secondary School Teachers

== Forde Library ==
The Forde Library, the academic center of the University of the Southern Caribbean, provides access to information as well as a number of services that cater to your academic needs. Its material is principally divided across seven collections. The members of staff are available to attend to your research, loan, directional, security and comfort needs.

It serves as an informational and learning resource centre in supporting the overall curriculum goals of the University. It is located near the southern end of the campus, and can be seen from Gate 1. It is obliquely opposite the Men’s Residence Hall and directly opposite the University Cafeteria.

The library has over 50,000 volumes, 4,000 bound periodicals, and 200 periodical subscriptions, along with subject indexes. You can also visit it remotely to get electronic access to academic databases, electronic and digital books.

== Student life ==
University of the Southern Caribbean is home to a rich diversity of undergraduate, graduate students. The campus provides a various social programming that are geared to foster the development of healthy relationships between and among sexes, to develop good social skills in formal and informal situations and to encourage Christian attitudes and behavior.

=== Student activities ===
The Department of Student Development coordinates the social programs on the campus. The students are invited to participate in all the campus activities that help to develop balance and increase communication with each another.

=== Recreation ===
On the campus, there are areas designated for recreational activities. These include:

- The "slab" between the public road and Cedar Hall, basketball, and volleyball are played.
- Linda Austin Lawn Tennis court.
- The campus playing field next to the primary school.
- The Student Lounge.
- The Barn.
- The Estate Pool (N.B. Visiting is against school policy:Visit at own Risk).

== Notable alumni and former students ==
- David R. Williams – 1976 – Florence and Laura Norman Professor of Public Health at the Harvard School of Public Health, Professor of African and African American Studies and an Affiliate of the Sociology Department at Harvard University.
- Menissa Rambally - 1997 - St. Lucia`s Permanent Representative to the United Nations 2012 -, Cabinet Minister, St. Lucia.
- Lloyd Richardson - President of the Parliament of Sint Maarten, 2014-2015

== See also ==
- List of Seventh-day Adventist colleges and universities
- Seventh-day Adventist education
- List of universities in Trinidad and Tobago
