= Milton Hook =

Milton Raymond Hook (born 1939) is a Seventh-day Adventist religion educator, author and church historian. He is an honorary research fellow at Avondale College, New South Wales, Australia.

== Biography ==
Hook was born in Perth, Western Australia, and attended North Inglewood and Bickley elementary schools before entering Carmel College in Perth and Kent Street Senior High School, finishing with six credits including three distinctions.

During 1958 and 1959 he was a trainee schoolteacher at Manjimup and Victoria Park before proceeding to Avondale College, New South Wales, where he completed the Elementary Teachers Certificate (1961) and a Bachelor of Arts (1964). He was president of his graduation class.

Further studies were taken at the Evangelical Lutheran Seminary in Ohio (now Trinity Lutheran Seminary), and Andrews University in Michigan, graduating with a Master of Arts and Doctor of Education (1978). With the encouragement of his advisor, Hook wrote Flames Over Battle Creek based on his MA work. His doctoral dissertation is titled, "The Avondale School and Adventist Educational Goals, 1894–1900)." While doing this research he became the only known Australian to have read all of the Australian manuscripts of Seventh-day Adventist Church pioneer Ellen G. White, written during the years 1892 to 1901.

He has worked as a church pastor in Australia and Ohio, a mission director in Papua New Guinea, and a religion teacher in Australia, New Zealand and the United States. Throughout his career he has exercised his interest in historical research and the publication of his findings.

Hook served his local community in Rotary Club (1984–1995) including several directorships and as president of the Waitara branch in Sydney. He is also a committee member of the Sydney Adventist Forum, the Eastwood-Epping Philatelic Society, and secretary of the Royal Sydney Philatelic Club. He does volunteer work for the Philatelic Society of New South Wales.

Milton Hook has also served as the president of the Sydney Adventist Forum. At a meeting in 2005 Sydney Adventist Forum reminisced about the momentous gathering of Adventist scholars and administrators at Glacier View, Colorado in 1980. Approximately 250 people attended the Sydney Adventist Forum meeting. Two presentations were given by Desmond Ford (the subject of the 1980 meeting), as well as a paper delivered by Arthur Patrick, and a paper by Norm Young was read (although he was not present).

In 2008, Hook released a biography titled, Desmond Ford: Reformist Theologian, Gospel Revivalist published by Adventist Today. The book has started healthy debate in Seventh-day Adventist circles as it clarifies issues in Adventist theology. This is the first official biography of Desmond Ford with Hook charging the church hierarchy with calumny during Ford's defrocking. The book is heavily footnoted. It emphasises the Christian gospel, and describes a number of key Adventist doctrines.

== Publications ==
Hook has edited or contributed to the following journals:

- Ministry
- Record
- Signs of the Times (Australia)
- Hari
- Jacaranda
- Worker
- Adventist Heritage
- Adventist Professional
- Intrasyd
- Avondale Reflections, published by the Avondale Alumni (webpage)
- Good News Unlimited

Book chapters by his pen are included in:

- "Seventh-day Adventists in the South Pacific: 1885–1985," ed. Noel Clapham (Warburton, Victoria: Signs Publishing Company, 1985), pp. 144–165
- "Towards Righteousness by Faith: 1888 in Retrospect," ed. Arthur Ferch (Wahroonga, NSW: South Pacific Division of Seventh-day Adventists, 1989), pp. 25–49
- "Symposium on Adventist History in the South Pacific: 1885–1918," ed. Arthur Ferch (Wahroonga, NSW: South Pacific Division of Seventh-day Adventists, 1986), pp. 92–104

He was a consultant for Kerrin Cook, "The Railway Came to Ku-Ring-Gai," and contributed to the Historical Encyclopedia of Western Australia.

=== Books and monographs by Milton Hook ===
- Flames Over Battle Creek. Washington, D.C.: Review and Herald, 1977.
- Adventist Heritage Series, Nos. 1–32. Sydney, NSW: Seventh-day Adventist Church (South Pacific Division Education Department), 1988.
- Avondale: Experiment on the Dora. Cooranbong, NSW: Avondale Academic Press, 1998.
- Okely Ancestors. Castle Hill, NSW: Bold Print, 1998.
- A Smith Family From Boldre. Self-published, 1998.
- Hook Family Ties to Tenterden. Self-published, 1999.
- Eastwood-Epping Philatelic Society: The First Fifty Years. Sydney, NSW: Richard Peck, 2001.
- Desmond Ford: Reformist Theologian, Gospel Revivalist. Riverside, California: Adventist Today Foundation, 2008. ISBN 978-0-9786141-8-8, ISBN 978-0-9786141-9-5 (pbk.), ISBN 0-9786141-8-6, ISBN 0-9786141-9-4 (pbk.). Extract: "Contemporary Adventism: The Owl and the Aging Tiger". Adventist Today 15:3 (May 2007), p24

== See also ==
- History of the Seventh-day Adventist Church
