= Robert Brinsmead =

Australian Seventh-day Adventist

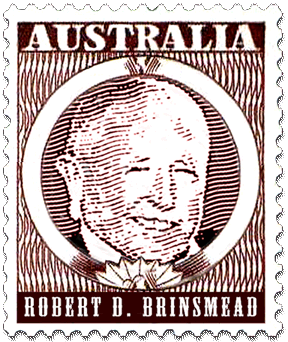
- Robert D. Brinsmead
- Born: August 9, 1933 (age 93); Victoria, Australia
- Occupation: Farmer
- Spouse: Valorie
- Theological work
- Tradition or movement: Seventh-day Adventist
- Main interests: Justification by faith alone

Robert Daniel "Bob" Brinsmead (born 9 August 1933, in Victoria, Australia) is a formerly controversial figure within the Seventh-day Adventist Church in the 1960s and 1970s who is known for his diverse theological journey.

During the 1960s Brinsmead advocated a form of perfectionism which he described as the "[Sanctuary] Awakening" message.

During the 1970s after examining the controversies of the Protestant Reformation and the writings of Adventist church co-founder and author Ellen G. White, he abandoned this position and went back to the 16th-century Protestant principle of justification by faith alone. His representation of justification by grace through faith alone was substantially from the writings and thinking of Martin Luther. He founded the magazine Present Truth, whose name was later changed to Verdict.

In the late 1970s, he again underwent another theological shift and changed his focus from a call to return to Reformation principles to that of systematically questioning and discarding many of the doctrines he had held. A side effect of this activity was the commissioning of an independent study and report on the basis for Christian beliefs on final punishment or hell by Edward Fudge. Brinsmead's Verdict Publications published the first edition of the resulting book The Fire That Consumes subtitled A Biblical and Historical Study of Final Punishment. The book became a major catalyst in the broader Christian evangelical world for a growing acceptance of annihilationism.

In the early 1980s Brinsmead's theology shifted to liberal Christianity, and he now rejected the Adventist belief in the Sabbath. He abandoned his belief in many orthodox Christian teachings, including justification through faith in Christ and the divinity of Christ, seeing God's interaction with mankind as not being limited to just the history of the Bible, but as an ongoing and continuous interaction with humanity towards a positive future.

In the 1990s he turned from his theological focus, and shifted his attention to politics and his tropical fruit theme park, Tropical Fruit World.

== Brinsmead and church tension ==
There was tension in the 1960s within the Adventist church surrounding Brinsmead's message and influence, but Brinsmead's active promotion of his shifting views in the 1970s and 1980s led to fading influence, and saw the rise of Desmond Ford who opposed his perfectionist views.

Richard Schwarz wrote in 1979, "Although there had been dissident groups in the church from its start, none was more troublesome to Adventist leaders than [Brinsmead's]". (This was eclipsed by the controversy and dismissal of Desmond Ford the following year.)

According to Larry Pahl, "The name of Robert D. Brinsmead was once capable of evoking strong emotion and division in the Adventist circles brave and informed enough to discuss his controversial ideas." His lessened influence is seen in the writings of the Standish brothers, "In the 1980s it is difficult to believe the emotive reaction which the name Brinsmead conjured up in the minds of the majority of Seventh-day Adventists in Australia two decades earlier. To have the name Brinsmead associated with a church member was akin to being termed 'pink' in the McCarthy era in the United States" (in other words, akin to being termed pseudo-"Communist" in an era of Communist paranoia)! His influence was described as "The Brinsmead Agitation" by the Biblical Research Committee, a precursor to the Biblical Research Institute.

Claims of collusion with Brinsmead could have devastating impact, according to the testimony of Desmond Ford. According to one report, towards the close of the Glacier View meeting, "a small group of church executives" confronted Ford with ultimatums such as "Publicly denounce Robert Brinsmead as a troublemaker and heretic or hand in your credentials." Ford would not do so, since Brinsmead had converted from his perfectionist views. According to a reported view of Ford, "John Brinsmead, brother of Robert, had evidently spun Keith Parmenter the allegation that Ford and Robert Brinsmead were in cahoots and were determined to bring the SDA church down." Apparently he accepted this "allegation without verification." Arthur Patrick described a South New Zealand minister in 1961, who integrated a man known to have a connection with Brinsmead into his church and was asked to affirm the statement, "Robert Brinsmead is of the devil," to demonstrate his loyalty. When he refused to do so, he was given 10 months leave-of-absence.

One source describes him as "intense and driven."

In 1999 Raymond Cottrell observed: "Robert Brinsmead’s repeated and mutually contradictory positions over the years, together with his dogmatic public insistence on each of them successively, is clear evidence of immaturity. One cannot help but wonder if the present one is final, or if it is—like the others—ephemeral and will be followed by others."

== Biography ==
=== Childhood ===
Brinsmead was born in 1933 in Australia, the youngest of eight children (another died in infancy) to Cedric John Brinsmead (1886–1980) and Laura Elsie Goullet (1889–1979). He grew up in the Tweed area. During his early childhood his parents were a part of the Seventh Day Adventist Reform Movement, a German splinter group that broke away from the Seventh-day Adventist Church in the World War I era over military service and conscription. They rejoined the mainstream church when he was 10. According to Schwarz, this background gave him a disposition that was skeptical towards church leadership; although this assertion was removed when Floyd Greenleaf revised Schwarz' work. As a youth he ran a large family banana plantation (near the location of what would become the tropical fruit theme park), and later sugar cane and banana plantations deep in the Queensland jungle. He spent his personal time doing study and research into theology.

=== Avondale College (late 1950s) ===
Brinsmead enrolled in a Bachelor of Arts in theology at Avondale College in 1955 when he was in his mid-twenties. One of his older brothers, John, also enrolled at the college in this year. Robert developed a form of perfectionism after reading the writings of A. T. Jones and E. J. Waggoner (of 1888 Minneapolis General Conference Session fame). His final year was 1958.

While still a student, Brinsmead was disfellowshipped from the church in 1961 for his writings on "perfectionism", which would be his theme for the 1960s. Brinsmead wrote he "retained lay membership in the church until 1962." However he would remain closely involved with the church for another two decades. John was also disfellowshipped, and together they formed the "Sanctuary Awakening Fellowship". While it was based in the United States, it also influenced Africa and Asia.

=== Perfectionist era (1960s) ===
Brinsmead's early views were a fanatical expression of "historic Adventism". His primary opponents were his friend and former classmate Desmond Ford, for sixteen years head of the Department of Religion at Avondale College, Hans LaRondelle of the Seventh-day Adventist Theological Seminary at Andrews University, and Edward Heppenstall. In the 1960s he advocated a form of perfectionism which he described as the "Sanctuary Awakening" or "Awakening" message. The "sanctuary" element referred to the distinctive Seventh-day Adventist theological understanding of events believed to have begun in the year 1844 in a heavenly sanctuary, of which the earthly sanctuary in the Old Testament was understood to be a figure and "type". Brinsmead believed that after Jesus concluded his mediatorial work in the heavenly sanctuary with the "blotting out of sins," a special outpouring of the Holy Spirit would perfect and seal believers and render them sinless. Thus he taught a physical transformation of living believers at the end of earth's history, distinct from the moment at the Second Coming of the physical change to immortality described in 1 Corinthians 15 and believed by many Christians. Brinsmead claimed he was led to this position by the pre-advent judgment in Seventh-day Adventist eschatology. He also claimed it was a thoroughly evangelical concept of justification – "I taught sanctification by atonement, not by attainment."

Brinsmead visited the United States throughout the 1960s, holding retreats and seminars to teach his message. The resulting Awakening movement had its own campmeetings, publications and songbook, and the controversy led to Adventist members in Australia and the United States being disfellowshipped.

The church in North America became aware of Brinsmead during the early spring of 1961, when he submitted several documents to the General Conference. Raymond Cottrell was asked to evaluate them, presenting critiques of each document about three weeks later, writing that he gave each one "careful consideration" with a desire to be completely objective (note: more recently Cottrell has criticized the investigative judgment and other Adventist doctrines). A few weeks later Robert and John came to the General Conference offices and requested a hearing, and a committee which included Cottrell met the brothers. The meeting had a "cordial atmosphere", spent mainly listening to the Brinsmeads express their views, and the groups "parted as friends."

According to Gary Land, in 1968 the brothers started Present Truth Magazine. However the first edition is dated April 1972.

=== Evangelical era (1970s) ===
In the early 1970s, he abandoned this position, and went back to a view more in line with the Protestant Reformer Martin Luther and Luther's understanding of the New Testament gospel message of Paul the Apostle. Desmond Ford convinced him that his perfectionism was incorrect in about 1970. Adventist eschatology was relegated to the background. Brinsmead reversed his ideas on the nature of Christ and perfection, and now believed "righteousness by faith" was entirely justification by faith. Largely due to the impact of Desmond Ford, Robert embraced righteousness by faith in the mid-1970s, rejecting perfectionism. He began to target Present Truth at Adventists and also other Christians, with a more evangelical message, and a central focus on the Protestant principle of justification by faith alone. A survey of issues of Present Truth throughout the 1970s indicated that he studied a wide range of 16th-century Protestant Reformation scholars, including John Calvin, Philipp Melanchthon, and Martin Chemnitz.

Brinsmead wrote A Review of the Awakening Message (Part I first published May 1972, and Part II first published April 1973), which was his own assessment of his earlier "historic" views. Brinsmead now found himself in substantial agreement with Desmond Ford, as Brinsmead's views on perfection had shifted away from what he had held.

In 1972, Brinsmead and his wife Valorie (born 1939, originally from Cootamundra, NSW) purchased the property which they developed into "Tropical Fruit World" in northern New South Wales.

=== Rejection of Adventism and Evangelical Christianity (Late 1970s and 1980s) ===
In the late 1970s Brinsmead began to systematically re-examine and give up many of his prior beliefs. He rejected the roots of the Adventist movement and its prophetic interpretations, the doctrine of the heavenly sanctuary, and the inspiration of Ellen White, and the Sabbath. His hesitation on discarding Adventist views on death and the afterlife caused him to commission independent research by Edward Fudge that eventually resulted in Fudge's influential book The Fire That Consumes: A Biblical and Historical Study of Final Punishment, which Brinsmead published in 1982.

Brinsmead changed the name of Present Truth to Verdict in 1978.

The controversy resulting from his publication in July 1979 of his "1844" Re-Examined Syllabus, Ford's October 1979 response to it, and the alarmed reaction of church administrators saw some depart from the church over the issues that were raised.

In June 1981 he published an issue of Verdict titled Sabbatarianism Re-Examined in which he rejected the Sabbath.

In 1983 he published a special issue of Verdict titled Justification by Faith Re-Examined.

Afterwards, Verdict quickly became a much smaller publication of newsletter size in which Brinsmead began to explore theological topics of more interest to liberal Christianity, before ceasing publication as a regular periodical altogether as he abandoned more orthodox Christian doctrines.

=== Change of interests (1990s) ===
During the 1990s Brinsmead did not write anything about theology for almost ten years. Raymond Cottrell wrote in 1999 that Brinsmead "seems to be immune to further rational dialogue", and that he "felt constrained to let him go his own way and do his own thing".

Brinsmead developed a sort of humanist emphasis. According to Larry Pahl, "Brinsmead's journey has led him back, full circle, to raw perfectionism. The new Brinsmead requires that we become 'forgiving, caring and compassionate, doing the right thing', certainly the marks of a perfect man."

=== Recent views (2000s) ===
Brinsmead emphasizes the human side in ecology.

On 7 August 2007, Robert Brinsmead's wife Valorie died at age 68.

Brinsmead has published his more recent views on a personal website, www.bobbrinsmead.com.

== See also ==
- Present Truth Magazine
- Progressive Adventism
- Historic Adventism
- Seventh-day Adventist theology
- History of the Seventh-day Adventist Church
- Desmond Ford
- Avondale College
- Hesba Fay Brinsmead, novelist and sister-in-law
