= Charles Scriven =

American theologian (born 1945)

Personal details
- Born: 1945 (age 80–81) Prineville, Oregon, U.S.
- Occupation: Theologian

Charles Scriven (born 1945, Prineville, Oregon) is a Seventh-day Adventist theologian who served as President of Kettering College from 2000 through 2013. He is a member of the Board of Directors of the Kettering foundation and chair of the board of Adventist Forums, publisher of Spectrum magazine.

== Career ==
After attending Walla Walla University in College Place, Washington, Scriven obtained a master's degree in divinity at Andrews University in 1968. In 1984 he obtained a Ph.D. in systematic theology and Christian social ethics at the Graduate Theological Union in Berkeley, California. He served for six years as minister in the Seventh-day Adventist church in Sligo in Montgomery County, Maryland. In 1992 he was appointed president of Columbia Union College in Takoma Park, Maryland. He has been an editor of Insight, a Seventh-day Adventist magazine for young people.

== Selected publications ==
- The Demons Have Had It: A Theological ABC (1976)
- The Transformation of Culture: Christian social ethics after H. Richard Niebuhr (1988)
- The Promise of Peace: Dare to Experience the Advent Hope (2009)

== See also ==
- Seventh-day Adventist Church
- Seventh-day Adventist theology
- Seventh-day Adventist eschatology
- History of the Seventh-day Adventist Church
- 28 fundamental beliefs
- Questions on Doctrine
- Teachings of Ellen White
- Inspiration of Ellen White
- Prophecy in the Seventh-day Adventist Church
- Investigative judgment
- The Pillars of Adventism
- Second Advent
- Baptism by Immersion
- Conditional Immortality
- Historicism
- Three Angels' Messages
- End times
- Sabbath in Seventh-day Adventism
- Ellen G. White
- Adventist Review
- Adventist
- Seventh-day Adventist Church Pioneers
- Seventh-day Adventist worship
- Adventist Health Studies
- Ellen G. White Estate
