= Norm Young =

Norman H. Young

Personal details
- Born: 1938 (age 87–88) Australia
- Occupation: Theologian

Norman Hugh Young (1938—) is a Seventh-day Adventist Christian theologian and New Testament scholar. He recently retired as senior lecturer at Avondale College in New South Wales, Australia.

== Biography ==
Norm was born in 1938, the son of an Australian soldier killed in the New Guinea campaign of World War II. Young trained as a fitter and turner before becoming a member of the Seventh-day Adventist church in early adulthood. He trained to become a minister of that religion at Avondale College and later completed doctoral studies under the prominent biblical scholar F. F. Bruce. His Ph.D. thesis entitled The Impact of the Jewish Day of Atonement upon the New Testament (Manchester, U.K.) was submitted in 1973.

He has described himself as a "reluctant participant" at the Glacier View meeting in 1980, in which his friend, Adventist theologian Desmond Ford's ministerial credentials were removed following his rejection of the investigative judgment doctrine.

In the 1980s Young became a vocal supporter of Australian Adventist Lindy Chamberlain who had been wrongly convicted of killing her daughter Azaria. He was later to publish an account of the struggle to have the Chamberlain conviction overturned. He presented a paper at the Chamberlain Case Symposium in 2005, describing the support the Adventist church provided to the Chamberlain family during the trial. Mrs Chamberlain-Creighton described Young as a close friend.

Young retired as a senior lecturer from Avondale College in the 2000s. He remains an Honorary Senior Research Fellow of Avondale.

In 2016, Young was honoured with a Festschrift published by Peter Lange and edited by Kayle de Waal and Robert McIver, No One Better: Essays in Honour of Dr Norman H. Young.

== Publications ==
- Syntax List for Students of New Testament Greek, supplement to John Wenham's highly acclaimed The Elements of New Testament Greek
- Azaria: The Religion Factor (1984)
- Rebuke and Challenge: The Point of Jesus Parables (Washington, DC: Review and Herald, September 1985). ISBN 0-8280-0286-X
- Innocence Regained: The Fight to Free Lindy Chamberlain (Annandale, Federation Press, 1989).
- Contributor to: The Essential Jesus: The Man, His Message, His Mission (book website)

Articles:

- 'Who's Cursed and Why? (Galatians 3.10-14)', Journal of Biblical Literature, 117:1 (1998) 79–92.
- 'An Aristophanic Contrast to Philippians 2.6-7', New Testament Studies, 45 (1999) 153–155.
- 'Bearing his Reproach (Hebrews 13.9-14)', New Testament Studies, 48:2 (2002) 243–261.

== See also ==
- Seventh-day Adventist Church
- Seventh-day Adventist theology
- Seventh-day Adventist eschatology
- History of the Seventh-day Adventist Church
- 28 Fundamental Beliefs
- Questions on Doctrine
- Teachings of Ellen G. White
- Inspiration of Ellen G. White
- Prophecy in the Seventh-day Adventist Church
- Investigative judgment
- Pillars of Adventism
- Second Coming
- Conditional Immortality
- Historicism
- Three Angels' Messages
- Sabbath in seventh-day churches
- Ellen G. White
- Adventist Review
- Adventism
- Seventh-day Adventist Church Pioneers
- Seventh-day Adventist worship
