= Progressive Adventism =

Seventh-day Adventist Church faction

Progressive Adventists are members of the Seventh-day Adventist Church who prefer different emphases or disagree with certain beliefs traditionally held by mainstream Adventism and officially by the church. While they are often described as liberal Adventism by other Adventists, the term "progressive" is generally preferred as a self-description. This article describes terms such as evangelical Adventism, cultural Adventism, charismatic Adventism, and progressive Adventism and others, which are generally related but have distinctions.

Progressives typically disagree with one or more of the church's basic beliefs such as the Sabbath or "distinctive" beliefs such as the investigative judgment, the remnant, a future global Sunday-law, or a use of Ellen G. White's writings. They also tend to question some of the denomination's 28 fundamental beliefs: with debate arising on the nature of the Trinity, perpetuity of the Law of God, the Nature of Christ, the Gift of Prophecy, Creation or observance of the seventh-day Sabbath."

It also has many similarities with the ecumenical emerging church movement, as both are characterized by their disillusionment with the organized and institutional church. Perceptions and definitions of it may differ somewhat depending on the author, although much in common is also clearly discernible.

== History ==
The movement emerged with certain interactions with evangelical Christians in the 1950s, which included the publication of Questions on Doctrine in 1957. This period marked a shift in the broader Christian world's perception of Adventists, from being viewed as a sect to being more commonly accepted as a legitimate Christian denomination. The term "progressive Adventist" was first used in the mid-1960s in Spectrum magazine, according to one author.

One scholar wrote in 2001:

"It is only within the last few decades that the Adventist Review has recognized editorially that there exists within the Seventh-day Adventist Church, at least in North America, 'liberals,' 'liberal churches,' 'liberal colleges/universities' and 'liberal conferences.' Depending on the author and his/her agenda, Adventist liberals are compared and/or contrasted with 'conservative Adventists,' 'historic Adventists,' 'Bible-believing (or EGW-believing) Adventists,' 'traditional Adventists,' 'evangelical Adventists,' 'cultural Adventists,' and/or 'ecumenical Adventists.'"

== Beliefs and practices ==
Progressives tend to agree on some beliefs, but differ or have a greater variation on others. According to one author, Progressive Adventism "regrets the anti-intellectual, authoritarian and obscurant tendencies that characterize a significant segment of traditional, historic Adventism, along with the attempts at creating a creed out of the "27 Fundamental Doctrines"."

Ron Corson identifies four common areas of progressive belief:

- Investigative judgment. A different view of the investigative judgment, or a denial of its biblical basis.
- Remnant. An inclusion of other Christians in the term remnant.
- Ellen White. A less rigid view of the Inspiration of Ellen White that may recognize her fallibility or express skepticism of her prophetic abilities.
- Sabbath. Progressive Adventists tend not to hold to the traditional view of Sabbath as a Holy day of worship, but emphasize some of the positive aspects of Sabbath such as it being made for human benefit (Mark 2:27), and deny that Sunday-keeping is or will be the mark of the beast.

=== Origins ===
Progressive Adventists tend to challenge traditional teachings such as young Earth creationism and some have accepted old Earth creationism or evolutionary creationism.

=== Church structure ===
Progressive Adventists typically believe the present church structure is very "top heavy" with too many levels of leadership, and possibly too much hierarchical control. Many mainstream Adventists such as George Knight have also called for change in this area.

=== Free press ===
Progressive Adventists tend to believe there should be candid reporting of news and information about the church whether positive or negative. They believe in open discussion in a free press. This view is also shared by many more mainstream Adventists such as former editors of the Australian Record James Coffin and Bruce Manners.

=== Music ===
Progressive Adventists are typically open to a variety of styles of worship music in church, including contemporary Christian music.

=== Movie theaters ===
Progressives typically disregard the church's stand on movie theater attendance. For instance, the adventist publication Spectrum does reviews of movies and TV shows.

== Varieties of evangelical/progressive Adventism ==
=== Cultural Adventism ===
A similar group have been referred to as "cultural Adventists". This term may be used by Adventists who are not overly concerned with theology, such as evangelical Kenneth Samples' description of "a segment that is atheological in nature and reflects what [he] would call a cultural Adventism." It may also refer to those who feel an attachment towards the Adventist church for cultural reasons only rather than beliefs or strict theological conformity.

Clifford Goldstein has declared,

"A cultural Adventist? The concept's incomprehensible to me... I'm an Adventist for one reason: the beliefs, the teachings, the doctrines that this church—and this church alone—espouses. If it were not for them, I'd be gone faster than the junk food at church potlucks. The Seventh-day Adventist culture had nothing to do with bringing me here. On the contrary, coming as I did from a secular Jewish background, the culture was the biggest obstacle."

=== Charismatic Adventism ===
While Adventist church worship is commonly conservative, a few minor segments in their history may be looked at as charismatic in nature. Phenomena of this nature have been present throughout Adventist history, resulting in such things as the Holy Flesh movement which Ellen White strongly rebuked."

=== Liberal Adventism ===
The term liberal Adventist or left-wing Adventist usually means "progressive Adventist" (the preferred self-designation; see above). This is appropriate because most progressive Adventists are still "conservative" or evangelical Christians. For example most do believe in the resurrection of Jesus. They do not hold to a "libertine" or "anything goes" attitude which the term "liberal" sometimes implies. A number of Progressive Adventists are actually liberal Christians, accepting such things as homosexuality and even support for LGBTQ individuals at the college and university level.

According to evangelical Kenneth Samples, "It should also be mentioned that, though small, there was and is a segment in Adventism which could be described as being theologically liberal" or even "very liberal". He claims it rejects Christ's vicarious substitutionary atonement.

Ron Corson wrote,

[Progressive Adventists] could be termed liberal, except that the term 'liberal Christian' generally refers to those who don't believe that Christ was resurrected nor that he performed miracles, and who hold other tenets with which most Progressive SDA's would not agree. These 'liberals' are often involved in the Jesus Seminars.

=== Social action ===
Many Progressive Adventists describe themselves as "liberal" to mean they are liberal or left-wing politically, and have a concern for political or social justice action.

=== Other terms ===
Also compare to the "Evangelical left" and "Progressive Christianity". Also compare to the "Christian/religious left" (although this term is associated with left-wing politics).

Other terms such as ecumenical Adventist and evangelical Adventist have been used, with presumably related meaning. (Compare the much broader movements "Ecumenism" and "Evangelicalism" within Christianity as a whole).

=== Moves toward mainstream Christianity ===
The 1957 publication of Questions on Doctrine (QOD) as a result of dialog with critic Walter Martin is seen as a beginning for Progressive Adventism. According to one author, the roots of evangelical Adventism can be traced to scholars who met with Martin and Barnhouse, or earlier. "The seeds of this movement were sown within the denomination via the book QOD in 1957, and the seed-plot was watered by the public ministries of such men as R. A. Anderson, Robert Brinsmead, Desmond Ford, Smuts van Rooyen, and others." This book precipitated the different factions. The movement emerged with Ford and Brinsmead as its main spokesmen. Brinsmead changed his stance while Desmond Ford openly differed with several church viewpoints in the 1970s., echoing some of the ideas of A.F. Ballenger. Many liberals left the church in this period and liberals still follow and cite his viewpoints.

According to one author, Progressives reject the mainstream views on and are united by belief in the pre-fallen nature of Jesus (and hold he was primarily our substitute not our example), assurance of salvation without sanctification, that overcoming sin or perfectionism is impossible, that Jesus ascended straight to the Most Holy Place rather the Holy Place in the tabernacle in heaven at his ascension (although opinions varied on a pre-advent judgment), that Ellen White had the gift of prophecy but was not infallible nor should be used for doctrine.

== Media ==
=== Operational ===
Progressive Adventists, such as Raymond Cottrell, were responsible for the progressive-leaning Spectrum (archives), a newsmagazine published by Adventist Forums, that has been the premier independent Adventist magazine since its founding in 1969. In addition to its quarterly journal, Spectrum also runs a regularly updated website with news and analysis on developments within the Church and other areas. Progressive Adventists also established Adventist Today (archives), a bimonthly magazine first published in 1993. In 2008 Adventist Today made a renewed commitment to reporting on a greater diversity of Adventist views.

Also started by Progressives was Adventist Heritage: A Journal of Adventist History (archives), "which provided an important liberal platform" from 1974 to 1998 in roughly 18 volumes. It was supported by the Association of Seventh-day Adventist Historians and other groups. Gary Land was a founding editor, as was Ronald Numbers. Jonathan M. Butler served as editor for a decade. Published twice yearly, it was acquired by Loma Linda University.

=== Historical ===
A number of Progressive Adventist publications have gone out of print in the last number of years. These include Present Truth Magazine (archives) founded by Robert Brinsmead in 1972 with a grace/gospel-centered focus. In 1978 Brinsmead changed its title to Verdict, to reflect his move away from evangelical Christianity. The material on the Present Truth Magazine website is produced by the "Gospel Friends Christian Fellowship", which they explain to be an association of evangelical Seventh-day Adventists. It does not necessarily represent Brinsmead's current views. 52 issues were apparently published.

The Good News Unlimited magazine (archives) is published by Desmond Ford's ministry of the same name. It began in 1981 as a bimonthly, switched to monthly publication in mid-2003, and continues to be published as of 2008. A related magazine is Good News for Adventists.

Adventist Professional was an Australian magazine published quarterly from 1989 to 1999 by the Association of Business and Professional Members (formerly "[...] Men") based in Sydney, an organization of Australia and New Zealand Adventist business and professional laypeople established in 1961. Eleven volumes were published, and Trevor Lloyd is a former editor.

The magazine Adventist Currents (archives) was published from 1983 to 1988 in California as a response to Ford's dismissal. Three volumes totaling 11 issues were published, as well as several issues of a newsletter in 1990.

The magazine Evangelica was published from 1980 until 1987 in 8 volumes and promoted the cause of evangelical Adventism. It was started in reaction to Desmond Ford's dismissal from the ministry.

== Organizations and Conferences ==
Some claim that numerous Adventist conferences and meetings have a progressive flavor. Possibly see also the International Conference on Innovation.

=== Adventist Society for Religious Studies ===
The Adventist Society for Religious Studies (ASRS) is a scholarly organization committed to the exploration of progressive religious issues and ideas in contrast to its more conservative spinoff group, the Adventist Theological Society. ASRS meets in conjunction with the annual meetings of the American Academy of Religion and the Society of Biblical Literature.

=== Adventist Forum Conference ===
Adventist Forum, publisher of Spectrum magazine and the Spectrum website, hosts an annual conference. Adventist Forum groups meet regularly around the world.

=== Adventist Today Conference ===
The publishers of the magazine Adventist Today held its first conference in 1998, a camp meeting in Riverside, California.

=== Spiritual Renaissance Retreat ===
The Spiritual Renaissance Retreat was an annual event (1994–2013) hosted by John and Joan Hughson of Pacific Union College Church, and co-sponsored by Adventist Forum and Adventist Today. Held in Monterey, California, it was based partly on the annual retreat concept popularized by Bill Clinton. The featured speaker in 2008 was former Adventist Desmond Ford of Good News Unlimited.

== Relations with others ==
=== Relations with other Christians ===
Progressive Adventists claim that they display an open and inclusive attitude towards other Christians and other beliefs and doctrines that differ from the Adventist church. Other Christians such as Tony Campolo has had positive experiences speaking on numerous Adventist university campuses. Clark Pinnock gave very favourable reviews of Alden Thompson's Inspiration, despite the significant attention given to Ellen White in the content, and Richard Rice's theology textbook Reign of God. Pinnock was also impressed by Richard Rice's book The Openness of God, and later was the editor for another work of the same name, contributed by authors Rice, John E. Sanders and others.

The evangelical Christian Research Institute has offered "a hand of fellowship and encouragement" to what they describe as Evangelical Adventism.

Progressive Adventists claim they are supportive or appreciate those statements by Ellen White which affirm other Christians, such as the instruction to come near to ministers of other denominations, to pray with and for them.

Some authors report increased mixing of Progressive Adventists joining with other Christians worshiping on Sunday rather than the Sabbath. For instance in North America, "It's not uncommon to find a member in church on Sabbath morning who, on another day, joins a study group of a different denomination or no denomination."

=== Criticism ===
Clifford Goldstein has criticized cultural Adventists and the Adventist left, as described above. He had a blog on the Adventist Today website for nearly one year. He applies an Ellen White quote to liberal Adventists, "We have far more to fear from within than from without." Samuel Koranteng-Pipim displays a strong concern about liberal Adventist scholars. By Alden Thompson's count, "The footnotes label some 66 Adventist scholars, authors, administrators as being on the wrong side of the divide." Former General Conference president Robert S. Folkenberg wrote "Will the real evangelical Adventist please stand up?" An article in Proclamation!, a magazine produced by former Adventists critical of Adventism, criticizes progressive Adventism in particular, claiming that evangelicalism and Adventism are incompatible. The authors of Seeking a Sanctuary have argued that a common theology keeps Adventists together. They claim religions usually remain unified by ethnicity, but this doesn't hold for Adventism which they consider culturally diverse. Former Adventist J. Mark Martin gave talks entitled, "An Evangelical Adventist?" Andy Nash encountered some within the Adventist Today and Spectrum groups who had a liberal view of Scripture. Some rejected the Bible's position on homosexuality, or believed Adam and Eve or Daniel were not real people. He commented,

Do you see the irony here? At times, this movement has struggled to make room for those who took a high view of Scripture, who grappled with the biblical text but arrived at different conclusions. Yet today we have "thought leaders" willing to set aside major teachings of Scripture altogether.

He argues for an atmosphere of tolerance of different perspectives, as long as there is respect for the authority of the Bible.

One book claims qualities of liberal "break-off congregations" as having the following: "1. Call your congregation something besides 'Seventh-day Adventist.'" "2. Mute and muffle distinctive Adventist doctrines." "3. And don't call the SDA Church 'the remnant.'" "4. Downplay our well-defined and long-held standards." "5. Keep the tithes and offerings in your own congregation." "6. Reduce Ellen White's role merely to 'wise old woman.'" "7. Resist any authority from the conference level or higher."

=== University controversies ===
Progressive Adventists claim they believe in academic freedom for church theologians and scientists, and claim that church administrators are generally more conservative, which has led to differences of opinion with the more liberal academics. The Spectrum editors have said, "Every ten years or so another witch hunt occurs" in Adventist higher education.

Adventist historian Michael W. Campbell observes that Adventist "history teachers and the use of historical method became especially suspect as Adventism became more Fundamentalist during the 1920s," during which time its history teachers were "on the front line of those who were pushed out of the church". According to Terrie Dopp Aamodt, one of the first major "purges" was at Walla Walla College in 1938.

Raymond Cottrell, who some see as a "progressive Adventist", as he disagreed with certain traditional positions of the church, including the investigative judgment, claims that for the first hundred years in the Seventh-day Adventist Church, scholars did not control the church's theology and sees the 1930s and perhaps earlier as a time church administrators effectively controlled theology, and the 1950s as a time of openness. F. D. Nichol stated that the Seventh-day Adventist Bible Commentary would not have been possible without the theologically open climate in the church during the 1950s and 60s. In the early 1980s, the presidents of Southern Missionary College and Pacific Union College were given leave of absence, after criticisms. The 1980 Adventist Review article "Colleges in Trouble" by editor Kenneth Wood, was seen by some as a contributing factor. Employees were fired at Southern. Jerry A. Gladson, a lecturer was dismissed by the church.

A few scholars went against proposals to introduce centralized oversight of theological education, such as former General Conference president Robert Folkenberg's "Total Commitment to God " initiative in 1996, and Folkenberg's action to establish an overseeing "Board of Ministerial and Theological Education" in every Division of the church to oversee its theological seminaries "evoked significant criticism in some areas, including North America", which was put on hold. There was concern over the document "International Coordination and Supervision of Seventh-day Adventist Ministerial and Theological Education".

See also 2003 Conference on Religious and Theological Education. Alden Thompson and John Brunt at what is now Walla Walla University, "continued to promote the virtues of reason", prompting an official investigation of the educational institution.

Progressive Adventists have been involved in or have even begun controversies over origins or creation/evolution. Since 2009, Adventist members criticised La Sierra University because some lecturers have allegedly affirmed biological evolution which met with criticism from pastor David Asscherick, and others such as on the website "Educate Truth" founded by graduate Shane Hilde. As of 2009, church and university leaders had declined to discipline those involved. General Conference president Jan Paulsen made "An Appeal" for the affirmation of the traditional Adventist belief supporting Creation, but also gave support of the work of Adventist lecturers. The board of trustees of the university affirmed creationism. The debate was reported in the Adventist Review in 2010. Lawrence T. Geraty, president of La Sierra University (1993–2007), stated, "LSU continues to be a sound, loyal Seventh-day Adventist institution where victories for Christ happen every day." Ricardo Graham, chair of the La Sierra Board of Trustees (2008–2021) affirmed the university and its commitment to a "recent six-day creation."

See the 1987 official church statement "A Statement on Theological and Academic Freedom and Accountability".

== See also ==
- Charismatic Adventism
- Emerging church
- Historic Adventism
- Liberal Christianity
- Progressive Christianity
- Postmodern Christianity
- Sabbath in seventh-day churches
- Seventh-day Adventist education
- Seventh-day Adventist theology
- Seventh-day Adventist worship
- Spectrum (magazine)

== Other sources ==
- Malcolm Bull and Keith Lockhart (2006). "Education". Seeking a Sanctuary: Seventh-day Adventism and the American Dream (2nd ed.). Bloomington, Indiana: Indiana University Press. pp. 315–32. ISBN 978-0-253-21868-1.
- Tarling, Lowell R. (1981). "Evangelical Adventists". The Edges of Seventh-day Adventism: A Study of Separatist Groups Emerging from the Seventh-day Adventist Church (1844–1980). Barragga Bay, Bermagui South, NSW: Galilee Publications. pp. 222–35. ISBN 0-9593457-0-1.
- Dale Ratzlaff, The Cultic Doctrine of Seventh-day Adventists, 1996, p333–337
- "'Liberals' and 'Conservatives'" by John McLarty in Adventist Today 6:3, p.
- "Caught in the Middle" by Dennis Hokama
- "Non-Fundamentalist Adventism" by John McLarty. Adventist Today 10:4
- Matt Burdette, "The Shape of Progressive Orthodoxy". Spectrum Blog, 25 March 2010
