= Luke Ford (blogger) =

American journalist

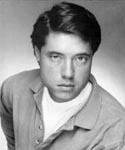
- Luke Ford, circa 2000
- Born: 28 May 1966 (age 60); Kurri Kurri, New South Wales, Australia
- Education: University of California at Los Angeles
- Occupations: Writer, blogger
- Parent(s): Desmond Ford, Gwen Ford

Luke Carey Ford (born 28 May 1966) is an Australian-American writer, blogger, and former pornography gossip columnist.

== Personal life ==
Ford moved to California in 1977. His father, Desmond Ford, was a noted Seventh-day Adventist theologian, and was the centre of a theological controversy in the late 1970s and '80s. His mother, Gwen Ford, published a book when he was two years old, but died of bone cancer in March 1970, when Ford was three.

After leaving the Seventh-day Adventist Church, Ford explored atheism. Ford states that he was converted to Judaism through a Los Angeles Beis Din. Ford says he observes the Jewish Sabbath, attends synagogue regularly, and keeps kosher. He has been asked to leave at least two different congregations. Ford wrote about his religious ostracism in XXX-Communicated: A Rebel Without a Shul.

Ford claims to have been diagnosed with narcissistic personality disorder and histrionic personality disorder.

== Professional ==
Ford studied economics at UCLA but did not graduate. Instead, he worked as an investigative journalist for southern California newspapers and at a radio station. In 1995, he became intrigued with the lack of journalistic coverage of the pornography industry, and started to write a book, which became A History of X.

In January 1996, after researching porn for a year, Ford wrote, produced, directed and acted in What Women Want, a pornographic video. It was not a success. Ford is credited as "Dick Dundee".

In 1997, Ford started his pornography gossip website, LukeFord.com. He said, "I'm not a businessman. I'm not a conventional journalist. I'm a story teller/entertainer/lunatic."

Ford was sued for defamation multiple times by people in the porn industry, including by RJB Telecom, whom he (as well as the Federal Trade Commission) accused of dishonesty; Christi Lake, whom he mislabeled in a bestiality photo; and Laurie Holmes (widow of John Holmes), for accusations of prostitution on the set. Ford has said that he has been sued five times to date: one suit was dropped, another was thrown out, another was settled when his insurance company paid $100,000, and the last two were settled when he removed some of his statements without making a retraction. In 2001, Wired called him "The Most Hated Man in Web Porn". In 2001, he was physically assaulted by Mike Albo, an editor for Hustler.

In August 2001, after urgings of his rabbi, Ford sold his main website, lukeford.com to Netvideogirls.com for $25,000, and created lukeford.net which avoided pornography, and focused more on Jewish issues. One year later, after nearly going broke, he returned to his pornographic roots by starting lukeisback.com with many of his old archives.

In October 2007, Ford announced he had sold lukeisback.com and its contents for an undisclosed sum to an undisclosed party. "Any writing I do on the porn industry from now on will be for publications with no porn advertising," Ford said. Those owners, whose names have not been divulged, ran the site until June 2008 but walked away from the site saying that writing the site was too much work for the money earned. In 2008, it was sold a second time, with the new owner being long-time industry observer Cindy Loftus.

In 2007, AVN Hall of Famer Bill Margold said that "Luke Ford is exactly what we deserve... Luke's not really a blogger as much as is an internet journalist". Ford was also in the 2012 documentary After Porn Ends, which is about life after being a porn actor.

== Bibliography ==
- A History of X: 100 Years of Sex in Film, Prometheus Books, 1999. ISBN 1-57392-678-7
