= Evangelica =

US Christian magazine (1980–1987)

Evangelica was a magazine started in Berrien Springs, Mi in 1980 following the controversial dismissal of Seventh-day Adventist theologian Desmond Ford. The founders of the magazine were graduate students at Andrews University. It was published until 1987, and had an "Evangelical Adventist" perspective. The university and church administration proscribed the magazine and banned its distribution as well as threatening the status of the student publishers.

It has OCLC 10234046.

== History ==
Evangelica was established in 1980 following Desmond Ford's dismissal from ministerial and teaching positions over his criticisms of the Adventist church's investigative judgment teaching. Ford soon formed his own non-denominational gospel ministry Good News Unlimited.

The "dissident bimonthly" Evangelica based in Napa, California was founded in reaction. Evangelica promoted the cause of evangelical Adventism. One author describes it as "wholly dedicated to the Fordian view on righteousness by faith, and the first issue gave a blow-by-blow description of the sacking of Ford." It was published alternately with Evangelica update (library number OCLC 9883255). Evangelica update was apparently published from 1982 till 1998, and also in 1993. Evangelica ceased publication in 1987.

=== Editors ===
- Alan Crandall

Bart Willruth, Associate Editor Alexander Labrecque, Associate Editor

== In popular culture ==
A horse named after the magazine competed in the 1997 Grand National steeplechase finishing last of seventeen to complete the course.

== See also ==
- Desmond Ford
- Progressive Adventism
