= Spectrum (magazine) =

Magazine published by Adventist Forums

- Editor: Alexander Carpenter
- Categories: Christian magazine
- Frequency: Quarterly
- Circulation: 3000
- First issue: Winter (northern hemisphere), 1969
- Company: Adventist Forum (Roseville, CA)
- Country: United States
- Language: English
- Website: www.spectrummagazine.org
- ISSN: 0890-0264

Spectrum is the official publication of Adventist Forum and a non-official publication of the Seventh-day Adventist Church, published four times a year. It was established "to encourage Seventh-day Adventist participation in the discussion of contemporary issues from a Christian viewpoint, to look without prejudice at all sides of a subject, to evaluate the merits of diverse views, and to foster intellectual and cultural growth." It presents a theological point of view which tends to be from the liberal progressive Adventist viewpoint.

== History ==
Spectrum was founded in 1969. Molleurus Couperus, a physician in Loma Linda, California, was appointed the first editor.

The magazine published the transcripts of some discussions from the 1919 Bible Conference in the 1970s. Editor Roy Branson later reflected that "was the single most important issue" of the journal.

In 1998, Spectrum's offices moved from Takoma Park, Maryland, to Roseville, California. The organization also maintains an active website focused primarily on original news reporting.

=== Editors ===
- 1969–1975: Molleurus Couperus
- 1975–1978: Roy Branson and Charles Scriven
- 1978–1998: Roy Branson
- 1998–2022: Bonnie Dwyer
- 2022–present: Alexander Carpenter

See also the "Meeting the Team" series of interviews, c. 2009.

=== Internet presence ===
Raquel Mentor serves as digital editor. The Spectrum website was majorly redeveloped in 2007, and again in 2023. In December 2008, Spectrum reported that its website ranks second amongst "Adventist news and commentary oriented websites", topped only by the Adventist Review.

== See also ==
- List of Seventh-day Adventist periodicals
