= Sanctuary Review Committee =

Seventh-day Adventist Church meeting (1980)

In the Seventh-day Adventist Church, the Sanctuary Review Committee was a group of biblical scholars and administrators which met to decide the church's response to theologian Desmond Ford, who had challenged details of the church's "investigative judgment" teaching. The meeting was held from August 10–15, 1980, at the Glacier View Ranch, a church-owned retreat and conference centre in Colorado, United States. The event is referred to informally as "Glacier View". The outcome was Ford losing his job.

It was also the largest investment of money and time of church workers ever given to a doctrinal issue in Adventist history. At the time, one scholar stated it was the most significant Adventist meeting of its type since the 1888 Minneapolis General Conference Session. Ford's firing was a controversial and emotionally charged issue, and the church experienced the largest exit of teachers and ministers in its history. One modern commentator describes 'Glacier View' as "Adventist shorthand for pain, dissension and division".

== Background ==
The investigative judgment doctrine is a unique element of the Seventh-day Adventist faith, relating to the nature of judgment of professed Christians. Investigative judgment has been criticized, in part or whole, by a few vocal Adventists since the late nineteenth century, such as D. M. Canright, A. F. Ballenger, W. W. Fletcher, W. W. Prescott, Louis R. Conradi, and Raymond Cottrell. Many of these individuals ultimately left the Adventist church. Issues with the traditional Adventist interpretation of Daniel 8:14 were acknowledged by a number of North American theologians in the 1950s, with the result that a special committee was formed to discuss "problems in the book of Daniel".

In the 1970s, dissident Australian former church member Robert Brinsmead attempted to convince leading Adventist theologians Desmond Ford and Edward Heppenstall to write a refutation of it. Brinsmead said he hesitated "blasting this theology because I thought someone from within Adventism should do it." After Ford and Heppenstall declined his request, Brinsmead returned to Australia and wrote the critical work "1844" Re-Examined which he published in July 1979.

Desmond Ford, described by Time magazine as "a prominent Australian theologian", had been lecturing in theology at Avondale College in Australia. However due to criticisms of his theology the church asked him to move to the United States in 1977, where he began lecturing at Pacific Union College. Though Ford and Brinsmead had known each other on friendly terms since their student days at Avondale in the 1950s, Ford had spent years in his capacity as a minister and theology professor employed by the Adventist Church being asked to respond to Brinsmead's views and opposing his perfectionistic doctrines. When Brinsmead repudiated his earlier views by the early 1970s and embraced more traditional Protestant views of salvation that had been championed by Ford, the men found themselves in substantial agreement on many points.

By invitation in response to the circulation of Brinsmead's new book, on 27 October 1979 Ford delivered an address to the Association of Adventist Forums (now Adventist Forums), held at Pacific Union College, in which he outlined the major problems that he perceived with the doctrine and briefly suggested his solution, in which he attempted to apply the "Apotelesmatic Principle" to the traditional Adventist interpretations of the ministry of Christ in the heavenly sanctuary, the Day of Atonement, Daniel 8:14, and Hebrews 9 and 10. Ford argued Adventist Church co-founder Ellen White had already set a precedent in this regard. The talk was entitled, The Investigative Judgment: Theological Milestone or Historical Necessity?. Ford claims that he had been granted immunity to speak his views publicly at this conference. However, the meeting was taped, and copies of the tape were quickly circulated widely by Brinsmead with his book and by others. Already a controversial figure among Adventists in Australia and linked in many minds with Brinsmead, Ford's talk was rumored to be a coordinated attack with Brinsmead on Adventist teachings. The Church’s leadership responded by summoning Ford to a meeting of 111 theologians and the Church's administrators to evaluate his views. Before the meeting, he was given 6 months of paid leave during which he prepared a 991-page manuscript entitled Daniel 8:14, the Day of Atonement, and the Investigative Judgment, which began "The present writer has as his intent the defense of the church." It is also known as the "Glacier View Manuscript." Ford later summarised the manuscript in an article for Spectrum.

== The Glacier View Meeting ==
The "Sanctuary Review Committee" (SRC) met at Glacier View Ranch near Denver in Colorado from August 10–15, 1980. Ford presented his views to the Glacier View attendees as presented in his document. According to Time, he "made the case that Ellen G. White's 'sanctuary' explication of 1844 no longer stood up in the light of the Bible, and that 'investigative judgment' undercut the whole basis of Protestantism: belief in salvation by God's grace apart from good works." His criticisms included,

- The "year-for-a-day" principle is an incorrect method for interpreting prophecy. (The 1844 date for the commencement of the judgment is thus invalidated.)
- The prophecy of Daniel chapter 8 is primarily concerned with events in the 2nd century BC (namely, the persecution of the Jews by the Syrian king Antiochus Epiphanes), and there is no contextual or linguistic support for linking it to the heavenly sanctuary. The "cleansing" in Daniel 8:14 relates to the removal of the desecration caused by the "little horn" (i.e. Antiochus Epiphanes); it has nothing to do with the sins of Christians. In fact, the Hebrew word translated "cleansed" in the KJV (sadaq) is different from the word used for "cleansing" (taher) in the book of Leviticus in connection with the sanctuary; it is more accurately translated "vindicated" or "restored", as in most modern Bible versions.
- The epistle to the Hebrews teaches that the Day of Atonement was fulfilled by the death of Jesus on the cross. In particular, Hebrews 6:19, 9:12 and 10:19-20 teach that Jesus entered into the Most Holy Place of the heavenly sanctuary immediately after his ascension, not 1800 years later. Hebrews thus contradicts the traditional Adventist idea of a two-stage heavenly ministry of Christ.

The Glacier View meeting ultimately produced two consensus statements, entitled “Christ in the Heavenly Sanctuary” and “The Role of Ellen G. White in Doctrinal Matters.” In addition, a ten-point summary was formulated by six of the attendees, outlining the main points of difference between Ford’s positions and traditional Adventist teaching. One month after Glacier View, Ford's employment with the Adventist church was terminated, and his ministerial credentials revoked. After counsel from the General Conference, the Australasian Division withdrew "Ford's ministerial credentials, noting that this does not annul his ordination..."

Ford has claimed that Glacier View initially "produced a consensus statement that moved towards Dr. Ford's conclusions in seven out of ten of his major positions", but that by the conclusion of the meeting the church "reverted to their former traditional positions". Others have claimed that although theologians present at Glacier View sympathised with Ford's position, they were "intimidated into silence by ecclesiological pressure"; the Adventist church has denied this to be the case.

These events were well documented by the independent Adventist journal Spectrum in its November 1980 issue.

"Ford [later] recalled the moment Raymond Cottrell came to him at Glacier View and with some foreboding said, 'Des, the administrators have not read your manuscript.' Cottrell may have overstated the case but it was a disturbing observation."

Ford has suggested that allegations of collusion with fellow controversial Australian figure Robert Brinsmead were a part of the proceedings. According to one report, towards the end of the meetings "a small group of church executives" confronted Ford with ultimatums such as "Publicly denounce Robert Brinsmead as a troublemaker and heretic or hand in your credentials." According to the report, "intense pressure brought to bear on Parmenter by a group of ultra-conservative members in Australia" added to the eventual dismissal of Ford from ministry. Ford would not denounce Brinsmead, who had "converted" from his perfectionist views. According to Ford, "John Brinsmead, brother of Robert, had evidently spun [then Australasian Division president Keith] Parmenter the allegation that Ford and Robert Brinsmead were in cahoots and determined to bring the SDA church down." According to Ford, Parmenter had apparently accepted this "allegation without verification".

=== Consultation I ===
The church selected Glacier View as the venue for the SRC because it had previously scheduled another meeting there--the 1980 Theological Consultation, a conference of about 100 church administrators and religion scholars, many of whom were also members of the SRC. The Consultation (August 10–15, 1980), called to discuss the relationship between administrators and theologians, not surprisingly blended into the issues and outcomes of the SRC. By default, it later came to be known as "Consultation I."

=== Consultation II ===
As a follow-up to the 1980 Consultation, the church convened "Consultation II" (September 30 - October 3, 1981), with 187 international participants, at the General Conference headquarters in Washington, DC. The conference focused principally on issues related to biblical interpretation.

== Aftermath and legacy ==
Following Glacier View, Ford ultimately formed his own ministry Good News Unlimited. It also led to the founding of the "dissident bimonthly" Evangelica, which was based in Napa, California.

The Adventist church formed a committee called the "Daniel and Revelation Study Committee" (often abbreviated DARCOM) in order to restudy the investigative judgment and the interpretation of these Biblical books. This committee has produced a seven volume series, which is available from the Bookshop of the General Conference's Biblical Research Institute. The main contributing authors are William H. Shea and Frank B. Holbrook.

In June 1981 a group of Adventist theologians wrote a protest, "The Atlanta Affirmation".

According to Time in a 1982 article, the church soon obtained the resignation of 120 clergy and teachers who refused to support SDA teachings. This was presumably for their support of Ford's theology. Peter Ballis, professor of sociology at Monash University and an ex-pastor himself, wrote the definitive study on the subject, Leaving the Adventist Ministry, which grew out of his doctoral studies. He found that 180 pastors left the Adventist ministry in Australia and New Zealand over the succeeding 8 years and calls it "the most rapid and massive exit of Adventist pastors in the movement’s 150-year history" (although he cautions that the fallout may have involved more than one factor). He claims the primary reason for exiting was not theology or personal reasons, but treatment by administrators. It is further speculated by Ford that a number of current ministers privately agree with Ford but refrain from speaking publicly on the issue for fear of losing their employment. Some in the Adventist church feel that the events of 1980 represent a major milestone in the theological development of the church, and that the effects of this controversy continue to be felt today.

The church news magazine Adventist Review received "many very angry letters" during the 1980s.

Ford opined in 2002 that when Edward Heppenstall received the Glacier View manuscript, "he declared, 'The church will never be able to answer this,' and the last 22 years have proved him right."

In 2005, the Sydney Adventist Forum held a seminar to commemorate the 25th anniversary of the Glacier View meeting. Approximately 250 people attended. Two presentations were given by Desmond Ford, as well as a paper delivered by Arthur Patrick, and a paper by Norm Young was read (although he was not present).

== See also ==
- History of the Seventh-day Adventist Church
