= Pre-advent judgment =

Belief that the Last Judgment will occur before the Second Coming

In Christian theology, the pre-advent judgment is a belief that the Last Judgment will occur before the Second Coming (or "Advent") of Jesus.

This concept stands in contrast to the much more common Christian belief that the Last Judgment will occur at or after the second coming.

== Interpretations ==
The Seventh-day Adventist Church believes that a pre-advent judgment started in the year 1844, known as the investigative judgment. It will conclude at the "close of probation" prior to the return of Jesus.

== See also ==
- Christian eschatology
- General judgment
- Particular judgment
