= Seventh-day Adventist theology =

The theology of the Seventh-day Adventist Church resembles early Protestant Christianity, combining elements from Lutheran, Wesleyan-Arminian, and Anabaptist branches of Protestantism. Adventists believe in the infallibility of the Scripture's teaching regarding salvation, which comes from grace through faith in Jesus Christ. The 28 fundamental beliefs constitute the church's current doctrinal positions, but they are revisable under the guidance of the Holy Spirit, and are not a creed.

There are many teachings held exclusively by Seventh-day Adventists. Some distinctive doctrines of the Seventh-Day Adventist church which differentiate it from other Christian churches include: the perpetuity of the seventh-day Sabbath, the state of unconsciousness in death, conditional immortality, an atoning ministry of Jesus Christ in the heavenly sanctuary, and an 'investigative judgment' that commenced in 1844. Furthermore, a traditionally historicist approach to prophecy has led Adventists to develop a unique system of eschatological beliefs which incorporates a commandment-keeping 'remnant', a universal end-time crisis revolving around the law of God, and the visible return of Jesus Christ prior to a millennial reign of believers in heaven.

(For differing theological perspectives, see the articles on Progressive Adventists and Historic Adventists.)

== Overview ==
=== Official beliefs ===
The Seventh-day Adventist denomination expresses its official teachings in a formal statement known as the 28 Fundamental Beliefs. This statement of beliefs was originally adopted by the church's General Conference in 1980, with an additional belief (number 11) being added in 2005. The 2015 General Conference session in San Antonio, Texas made some changes to the wording of several fundamental beliefs. Also significant are the baptismal vows, of which there are two versions; candidates for church membership are required to accept one.

In addition to the fundamental beliefs, a number of "Official Statements " have been voted on by the church leadership, although only some of these are doctrinal in nature. The Seventh-day Adventist Bible Commentary is a significant expression of Adventist theological thought.

=== Source of authority ===
==== View of Scripture ====
The first fundamental belief of the church stated that "The Holy Scriptures are the infallible revelation of [God's] will." Adventist theologians generally reject the "verbal inspiration" position on Scripture held by many conservative evangelical Christians. They believe instead that God inspired the thoughts of the biblical authors, and that the authors then expressed these thoughts in their own words. This view is popularly known as "thought inspiration", and most Adventist members hold to that view. According to Ed Christian, former JATS editor, "few if any ATS members believe in verbal inerrancy".

Adventists generally reject higher critical approaches to Scripture. The 1986 statement Methods of Bible Study, "urge[s] Adventist Bible students to avoid relying on the use of the presuppositions and the resultant deductions associated with the historical-critical method."

==== Role of Ellen White ====
Seventh-day Adventist approaches to theology are affected by the level of authority accorded the writings of Ellen White. Mainstream Adventists believe that White had the spiritual gift of prophecy, but that her writings are subject to testing by the Bible, which has ultimate authority.

According to one church document, "her expositions on any given Bible passage offer an inspired guide to the meaning of texts without exhausting their meaning or preempting the task of exegesis." "The Inspiration and Authority of the Ellen G. White Writings", document was issued by the Biblical Research Institute of the General Conference of Seventh-day Adventists. It has received worldwide review and input, although is not an official statement. It concludes that a proper understanding will avoid the two extremes of regarding her "writings as functioning on a canonical level identical with Scripture, or […] considering them as ordinary Christian literature."

Because of Ellen's endorsement of some of Alonzo Jones and E.J. Waggoner's positions in 1888, many went on to accept nearly everything they said a truth. However, Jones led those who would not seek Bible counsel alone into four false ideas, 1) to use Ellen's works as basis for sermons, 2) verbal inspiration of all her writings, 3) her writings were inerrant with no factual errors, and 4) literary and historical context of a statement was not important. Ellen rejected these positions and Jones eventually became Ellen's most vocal enemy. However, some SDAs still accept and promote these uses of Ellen's writings.

=== Relation to other groups ===
Adventist theology is distinctly Protestant, and yet in common with many restorationist groups, Adventists have taught that the majority of Protestant churches have failed to "complete" the Reformation by overturning the doctrinal errors of Roman Catholicism (see also Great Apostasy) and "restoring" the beliefs and practices of the primitive church—including seventh-day Sabbath keeping, adult baptism and non-immortality of the soul.

Adventists typically do not consider themselves part of the Fundamentalist Christianity community: "Theologically, Seventh-day Adventists have a number of beliefs in common with Fundamentalists, but for various reasons have never been identified with the movement... On their part, Adventists reject as unbiblical a number of teachings held by many (though not all) Fundamentalists..."

=== Theological roots ===
While Adventism stands within the larger stream of Protestantism that emerged from the 16th-century Reformation led by figures like Martin Luther, John Calvin, and Ulrich Zwingli, its theological formation was more directly shaped by 19th-century American Restorationism and revivalist movements. Although Adventists shared certain convictions with groups like the Anabaptists—such as believer's baptism and a commitment to Sola Scriptura—the movement did not descend from the Radical Reformation. Instead, its founders were influenced by the Christian Connexion, Methodism, and the ethos of the Second Great Awakening, all of which emphasized a return to biblical faith, personal piety, and preparation for Christ's second coming. Adventism's focus on biblical prophecy, seventh-day Sabbath observance, and the conditional immortality of the soul set it apart from both Magisterial and Radical Reformation traditions.

Restorationism was a vital force in many 19th century American religious movements. Restorationists believe that the Reformation, which began in the 16th century, would not be complete until the last vestiges of tradition were gone. Roman Catholic errors needed to be overturned and the teaching of the Bible firmly in place. They espoused Sola Scriptura, wanting Biblical evidence for every position. The Bible was to be their only guide-book in faith and practice. Its largest impact was the fostering of the getting back to the Bible attitude. Christian Connexion made an extremely large impact on Millerite Adventism and Sabbatarian Adventism. However, like many restorationist groups, Adventists typically believe that the majority of Protestant denominations have failed to "complete" the Reformation by "restoring" the beliefs and practices of the primitive church, such as Sabbath keeping, adult baptism, and the non-immortality of the human soul. Captain Joseph Bates described the seventh-day Sabbath as one of things that needed to be restored to the church before Christ would return.

Another doctrine which historically differentiated the Earlier, or Pioneer period of the Seventh-day Adventist Church from other Protestant denominations was the non-trinitarian belief in God as the Father, Christ as the Son of God, and the Holy Spirit as the Spirit of both God and of Jesus. This teaching was based on their early study of the Bible in meetings held in the 1840s and 1850s. Their Pioneer founder, Ellen White, said: “I do not wish to ignore or drop one link in the chain of evidence that was formed as, after the passing of the time in 1844, little companies of seekers after truth met together to study the Bible and to ask God for light and guidance. . . . The truth, point by point, was fastened in our minds so firmly that we could not doubt. . . . The evidence given in our early experience has the same force that it had then. The truth is the same as it ever has been, and not a pin or a pillar can be moved from the structure of truth. That which was sought for out of the Word in 1844, 1845, and 1846 remains the truth in every particular." Letter 38, 1906, pp. 1, 2. (To the Wahroonga Sanitarium Family, January 23, 1906.) {E. G. White, Manuscript Releases Volume 1, p. 52} Of these doctrinal Truths which they then held James S. White, her husband and General Conference President, wrote: “THE POSITION OF THE REMNANT As fundamental errors, we might class with this counterfeit (Sunday) sabbath other errors which Protestants have brought away from the Catholic church, such as sprinkling for baptism, the TRINITY, the consciousness of the dead and eternal life in misery. The mass who have held these fundamental errors, have doubtless done it ignorantly; but can it be supposed that the church of Christ will carry along with her these errors till the judgment scenes burst upon the world? We think not...Here are they [in the period of a message given just before the Son of man takes his place upon the white cloud, Rev.xiv,14] that keep the commandments of God and the faith of Jesus." This class, who live just prior to the second advent, will not be keeping the traditions of men, neither will they be holding fundamental errors relative to the plan of salvation through Jesus Christ. And as the true light shines out upon these subjects, and is rejected by the mass, then condemnation will come upon them. ... Solemn dreadful, swiftly-approaching hour!” {J. S. White, Review & Herald, September 12, 1854} Yet, the SDA Church recently has labeled that earlier Pioneer leadership position "in error," and has since officially changed the doctrinal position on the "Godhead" into a fully Evangelical teaching of the Trinity at the Dallas General Conference of SDA in 1980.

The Methodist or Wesleyan movement was influential in early 19th-century America. Its freewill orientation (as opposed to the predestination perspective of the Puritan heritage) seemed to line up with the experience of a nation nurtured in a frontier mentality where anything could be accomplished if one willed it and worked at it. Methodism popularized such ideas as Christ dying for all people rather than for just a predestined elect; that people had free will rather than a predestined will; that God's Spirit worked with every person through prevenient grace to wake them up to a sense of their need to turn to Christ; that people could accept salvation through a faith response to God's Holy Spirit; that one could resist grace and harden the heart; and that a Christian could fall from grace through apostasy. Those theological concepts stood in sharp contrast to the inherited Puritan/Calvinistic mentality that had dominated colonial Christianity. Adventists also accepted with Wesley the Reformation concept of justification by faith. To counteract antinomianism, Wesley emphasized sanctification as a process of becoming more like Jesus. Justification was the work of a moment while sanctification was the work of a lifetime. The concept the perfection was the dynamic biblical concept in which one lived in a growing state of perfect love toward God and other people.

Although William Miller had identified as a Deist prior to his conversion, he later rejected Deist views after an in-depth study of the Bible led him to embrace Christianity. Miller's background in Deist rationalism influenced the method—but not the theology—of his biblical interpretation. He adopted a logical, inductive approach to Scripture, describing the experience as a "feast of reason." His evangelistic method appealed primarily to reason rather than emotion, reflecting the Enlightenment context of his time. This rational, systematic study of the Bible—rather than Deist theology itself—contributed to the intellectual style that would later characterize both Millerite preaching and early Seventh-day Adventist theology.

Puritanism had a profound influence on the broader religious and moral climate of 19th-century America, particularly in its strong emphasis on biblical authority, legalistic piety, and the strict observance of Sunday as the "Lord's Day." This Sunday sabbatarianism, often framed in covenantal terms—that societal faithfulness to God would bring blessings, and disobedience would invite divine judgment—fueled widespread efforts to legislate Christian morality. However, the early Seventh-day Adventist embrace of the seventh-day Sabbath (Saturday) did not originate from Puritan sabbatarianism. Rather, it was introduced through direct contact with Seventh Day Baptists, especially Rachel Oakes Preston, who persuaded several Millerite Adventists to adopt Saturday observance in 1844. Pioneers such as Frederick Wheeler and Joseph Bates adopted the seventh-day Sabbath based on biblical study and the conviction that it was the original, unchanged Sabbath of Scripture.

Along with most Americans, Adventists had confidence in the ability of the "common person" to do almost anything, including theology. Theology had once been the domain of trained scholars, but the impact of a more radical democracy in the early 19th-century opened up possibilities for laypersons to take leadership initiatives.

Like Baconianism, where facts of science were found by examining the world, amassing information and then deriving conclusions, so too was the Bible studied in like manner. Gather all the relevant biblical facts (or texts) on a topic, and you will be correct in your interpretation.

=== Currently Shared Protestant Doctrines ===
Seventh-day Adventists at this time uphold the central doctrines of Protestant Evangelical Christianity:

1. "That God is the Sovereign Creator, upholder, and ruler of the universe, and that He is eternal, omnipotent, omniscient, and omnipresent.
2. That the Godhead, a Trinity, comprises God the Father, God the Son, and God the Holy Spirit. Three beings forming one God.
3. That the Scriptures are the inspired revelation of God to men; and that the Bible is the sole rule of faith and practice.
4. That Jesus Christ, as the Son, is "very God," and that He has existed with the Father from all eternity or co-eternally with the Father.
5. That the Holy Spirit is a personal being, sharing the attributes of deity with the Father and the Son.
6. That Christ, the Word of God, became incarnate through the miraculous conception and the virgin birth; and that He lived an absolutely sinless life here on earth.
7. That the vicarious, atoning death of Jesus Christ, once for all, is all-sufficient for the redemption of a lost race.
8. That Jesus Christ arose literally and bodily from the grave.
9. That He ascended literally and bodily into heaven.
10. That He now serves as our advocate in priestly ministry and mediation before the Father.
11. That He will return in a premillennial, personal, imminent second advent.
12. That man was created sinless, but by his subsequent fall now has a fallen, "sinful nature."
13. That salvation through Christ is by grace alone, through faith in His blood.
14. That entrance upon the new life in Christ is by regeneration, or the new birth.
15. That man is justified by faith, "without the deeds of the Law."
16. That man is sanctified by the indwelling Christ through the Holy Spirit.
17. That man will be glorified at the resurrection or translation of the saints, when the Lord returns.
18. That there will be a judgment of all men.
19. That the gospel is to be preached as a witness to all the world, before Christ returns the second time.

=== Millerism ===
The theological foundation of Seventh-Day Adventism is traced back to the teachings of William Miller. Four topics were especially important in understanding that substructure; 1) Miller's use of the Bible, 2) his eschatology, 3) his perspective on the 1st and 2nd angel's messages of Revelation 14, and 4) the seventh-month movement that ended with the "Great Disappointment".

Bible use

Miller's approach to Bible study was thorough and methodical, intensive and extensive. His central principle of Bible interpretation was the idea that "all scripture is necessary". He said, "bring all scriptures together on the subject you wish to know; then let every word have its proper influence, and if you can form your theory without a contradiction you cannot be in error." He held that the Bible should be its own expositor. By comparing scripture with scripture a person could unlock the meaning of the Bible.

Thus the Bible became a person's authority, rather than a creed or traditional writings. If a creed of other individuals or their writings served as the basis of authority, then that external authority becomes central rather than the Bible itself. Miller's guidelines concerning the interpretation of Bible prophecy was built upon the same four concepts. The Bible, so far as Miller and his followers were concerned was the supreme authority in all matters of faith and doctrine.

Second Advent

Millerism was essentially a one-doctrine movement—the visual, literal, premillennial return of Jesus. Miller was not alone in his interest in prophecies. The unprecedented upheaval of the French Revolution in the 1790s was one of several factors that turned the eyes of Bible students around the world to the prophecies of Daniel and Revelation. Coming to the Bible with a historicist scheme of interpretation and the concept that a prophetic day equals a real time year, Bible scholars began to study the time prophecies. Of special interest to many was the 1260 prophetic day/time prophecy of Daniel. Many concluded that the end of the 1260-day prophecy initiated the "time of the end", which they dated to the 1790s.

1st & 2nd Angels' messages of Revelation 14

The first angel proclaimed the "everlasting gospel" and "the hour of [God's] judgment is come." Miller believed that the first angel's message had recently been fulfilled with "the sending out of Missionaries and Bibles into every part of the world, which began about 1798." His followers came to see "the hour of his judgment" as when Jesus would return.

Throughout the 1830s increasing numbers of Protestant churches opened their doors to his preaching, not so much because of his "peculiar" preaching but because of his ability to bring converts to fill their churches. But a message that seemed harmless enough at first threatened to disrupt the churches by 1843. Millerism was not a separate movement at that time and the majority of believers remained members of the various churches. As 1843 approached, and Millerites became more assertive on the truth of the Bible over creeds, they increasingly found themselves forbidden to speak of their beliefs in their own congregations. When they persisted, they were disfellowshipped. Also, large numbers of congregations expelled pastors who supported Miller's teachings, and refused to listen to Second Advent preaching.

Millerite preacher Charles Fitch tied this to the second angels message of "Babylon is fallen .. come out of her my people." Fitch included those Protestant churches which rejected the Millerite teachings of the imminent second Advent with the Roman Catholic Church as being "Babylon." He called for his hearers to "come out of Babylon or perish." He provided his fellow Adventists a theological rationale for separating from their churches. It is difficult to overestimate the impact on the Adventist movement by Fitch's call. By 1844, some estimate that more than 50,000 Millerite believers had left their churches.

7th-month movement

Miller originally resisted being too specific about the exact time of Christ's return. Eventually, though, his message "about the year 1843" morphed into sometime between March 21, 1843, and March 21, 1844. Although this time passed, the spring disappointment did not greatly affect the movement. Then, S.S. Snow argued that the Day of Atonement, which fell on October 22 in 1844, would be the day that Christ would come. At first, Miller and Himes were reluctant to accept this date, however by October 6, they both came out in support of 22 October. With the expectation of the Second Advent at an all-time high, October 22, 1844, was the climax of Millerism. The day arrived and went, thus encouraging scoffers and fearful, and leaving the Millerites in total disarray. Whereas once the movement knew exactly where it was going, it was now in a state of uncertainty and in a state of crisis.

== The Great Disappointment ==
The vast majority of Millerites suffered loss of faith, and some even left Christianity altogether. The minority that remained split into several camps. Joshua V. Himes rapidly concluded that the prediction of the Advent of Jesus was correct, but they were wrong about the time. He believed that they "should watch and wait for the coming of Christ as an event that may take place at any hour." The smallest group of Millerites consisted of a few dozen Bible students scattered across New England. They did not become well acquainted until about 1847. They held on to the fulfillment of the 2300-day prophecy of Daniel 8:14 as 1844, but disagreed with the other Millerites on the event that took place. Future leaders of Seventh-day Adventism came from this group.

== Theological development following The Great Disappointment ==
In the early days of the movement, Seventh-day Adventist typically focused on those doctrines that were distinctive to Adventism.

=== "Present Truth" and the Pillars ===
Pioneering Adventists emphasized the concept of "present truth"—see 2 Peter 1:12 (NKJV). James White explained, “The church [has] ever had a present truth. The present truth now, is that which shows present duty, and the right position for us…” ”Present truth is present truth, and not future truth, and the Word as a lamp shines brightly where we stand, and not so plainly on the path in the distance.” Ellen White pointed out that “present truth, which is a test to the people of this generation, was not a test to the people of generations far back.” The founders of the SDA church had a dynamic concept of what they called present truth, opposed to creedal rigidity, and had an openness to new theological understandings that built upon the landmark doctrines, or Pillars of Adventism that had made them a people.

Still, the possibilities of dynamic change in Seventh-day Adventist beliefs are not unlimited. The landmark doctrines are non-negotiables in Adventist theology. Collectively they provide Seventh-day Adventists with an identity. These pillars of their faith were thoroughly studied out in the Scripture and attested to by the convicting power of the Holy Spirit. Ellen White said, "When the power of God testifies as to what is truth, that truth is to stand forever as the truth. ... Men will arise with interpretations of Scripture which are to them truth, but which are not truth. The truth for this time God has given as a foundation for our faith." Robert Johnston noted, “Without repudiating the past leading of the Lord, it [the Seventh-day Adventist church] seeks even to understand better what that leading was. It is always open to better insights to learn—to seek for truth as for hid treasure. … Adventists are still pilgrims on a doctrinal journey who do not repudiate the way marks, but neither do they remain stopped at any of them.” White further said that there is more truth to be revealed and that true doctrine will stand close investigation. But there is a solid foundation to build new truth upon. By early 1848, the first primary and closely related doctrinal pillars were adopted by Adventists: 1) The Second Advent, 2) The Heavenly Sanctuary, 3) The seventh-day Sabbath, and 4) the state of the dead.

These foundations, pillars, and landmarks are:

- the investigative judgement,
- the sanctuary that brings this judgment to light,
- the three angels' messages of Revelation,
- the law of God,
- the faith of Jesus,
- the Sabbath,
- the state of the dead, and
- the special gift of prophecy.

==== Second Advent of Jesus ====
Although the Second Coming [Advent] of Jesus is shared by all Christian churches, it was and is of special emphasis to the SDA church given its roots in Millerism and its inclusion in its name.

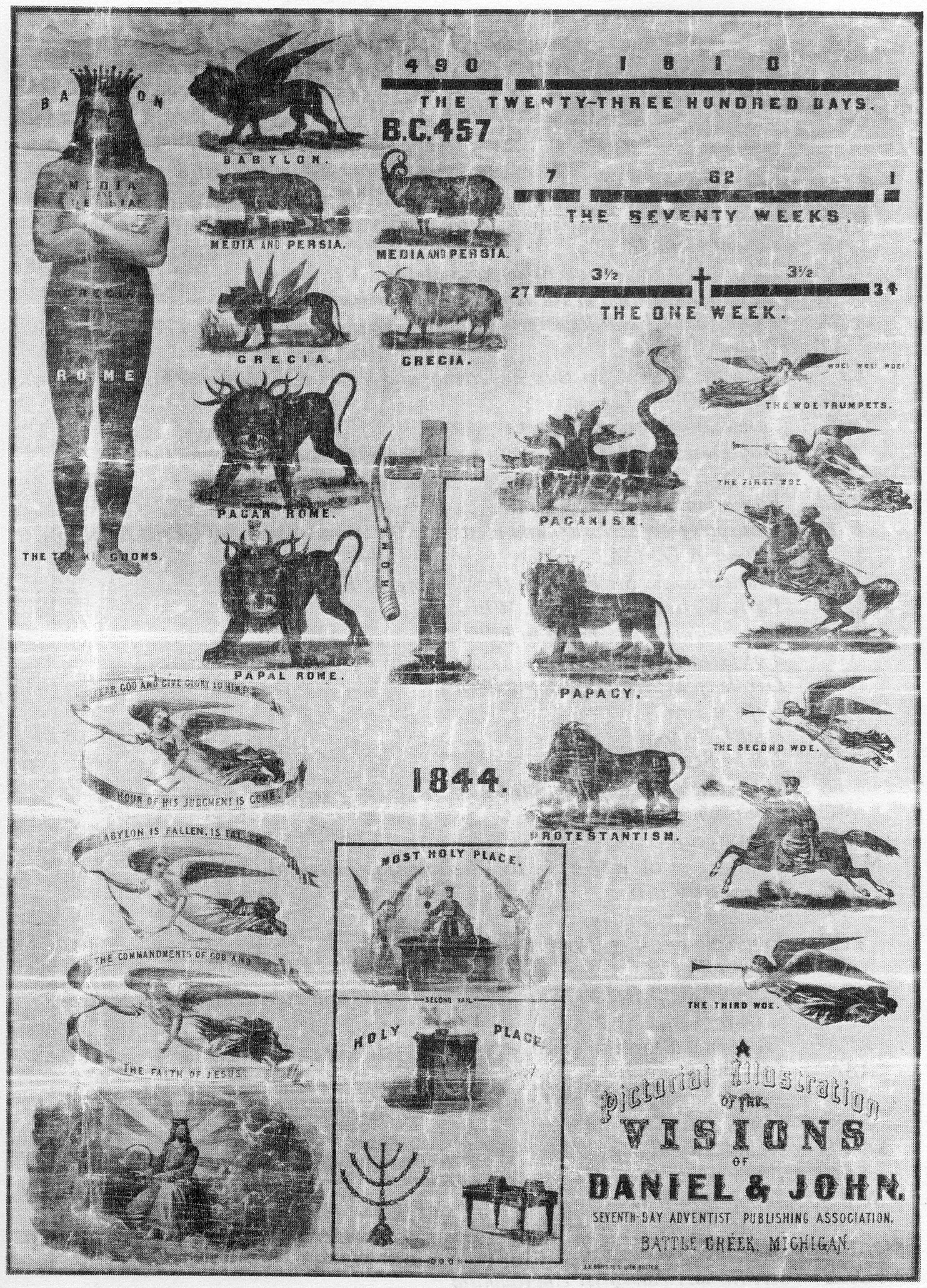
Seventh-day Adventist prophetic time chart from 1863, about the prophecies of Daniel and Revelation

Seventh-day Adventists believe in an imminent, universally visible (every eye will see him) Second Coming of Christ, which will be preceded by a "time of trouble". The second coming will coincide with the resurrection and translation of the righteous, as described in 1 Thessalonians 4:16. The unrighteous, or wicked, will die during the Second Coming then be resurrected after the millennium.

As compared to other Christian views of eschatology, the Seventh-day Adventist view is closest to Historic (or post-tribulational) Premillennialism. Conditions on earth are expected to steadily deteriorate until the "time of trouble" (which is similar to the Great Tribulation of classic premillennialist teaching), when civil and religious authorities will combine to unleash intense persecution upon God's people, particularly those who keep the seventh-day Sabbath. The time of trouble will be ended by the glorious appearing of Christ, which will also mark the commencement of the millennium.

Adventists reject dispensationalist theology and the pretribulation rapture, believing that the church will remain on earth throughout the end-time crisis. A further difference is that the millennial reign of Christ will take place in heaven, not on earth, and will involve all of the redeemed people of God, not just national Israel (see Fundamental Beliefs, no. 26 & 27).

Seventh-day Adventists interpret Revelation using the historicist method that includes some still future events. (see: Seventh-day Adventist eschatology (Revelation's prophecies)).

==== Three Angels’ Messages ====
The Three Angels are, according to SDAs, symbolic of three successive global movements that spread specific, important messages during the end times before the second coming of Jesus. They teach that these messages are given to prepare the world for the second coming of Jesus, and see themselves as a central part of the mission.

The 3 Angels' messages:

- Angel One (Revelation 14:6): The everlasting gospel is to be preach to all who are on the earth, "for the hour of his judgment has come." Worship Him who made heaven and Earth the Sea and Springs of water.
- Angel Two (Revelation 14:8): Babylon the great is fallen because she caused all nations to drink of the wrath of her fornication.
- Angel Three (Revelation 14:9): If anyone worships the beast, & receives its mark, they shall drink of the cup of the wrath of God.

First Angel

==== Cleansing the Heavenly Sanctuary ====
From the time of Second Great Awakening the Millerite movement proclaimed the soon return of Jesus. Adventists have traditionally interpreted the Millerite movement as the first of the three angels' messages. After the October 1844, Great Disappointment, it became progressively clear to a minority of the Milleries that the sanctuary of Daniel 8:14 could not be the earth and that the cleansing could not be the Second Advent. It occurred to Hiram Edson that instead of the High Priest coming out of the Most Holy and going to the earth on October 22, he proceeded into the Most Holy place to do a final work there prior to the Second Advent. After extensive bible study, Hiram and several others concluded that:

1. A literal sanctuary exists in heaven.
2. The Moses' tabernacle system, patterned after the heavenly temple, was a visual representation of the plan of salvation.
3. Just as the earthly priests had a two-phase ministry in the tabernacle, so too Christ had a two-phase ministry in the heavenly. The first began in the Holy Place at His Ascension, the second, on October 22, the date of the antitypical Day of Atonement, when He moved to the Most Holy Place.
4. The first phase of Christ's ministry dealt with forgiveness, while the second involved the blotting out of sins thus cleansing both the sanctuary and individual believers.
5. The cleansing of Daniel 8:14 was a cleansing from sin accomplished by blood rather than by fire. 6) Christ would not return to earth until he completed his second-apartment ministry.

Adventists therefore believe that Christ's work of atonement encompasses both his death on the Cross and his ministration in the heavenly sanctuary. As W. G. C. Murdock, SDA Theological Seminary Dean during discussion in the 1980 General Conference Session, Dallas, said, "Seventh-day Adventists have always believed in a complete [sufficient] atonement that is not completed [finished]." Venden points out that the atonement must have been complete at the cross— i.e., the sacrifice was sufficient. For when Jesus died for man's sin, it was enough to purchase man's salvation and man cannot add anything to it. Yet, says Venden, the atonement involves more that just sacrifice. The process of redemption, the restoration of man's broken relationship to at-one-ment with God, was not finished at the cross, else there would be no more sin or sickness or pain or sorrow or separation or battered children or hospitals or funeral trains or tombstones or broken hearts. It is the winning of men back to a love relationship with God that is not yet completed.

Early Adventists emphasized the two parts to the atonement: "[Jesus] ascended on high to be our only mediator in the sanctuary in Heaven, where, with his own blood he makes atonement for our sins; which atonement so far from being made on the cross, which was but the offering of the sacrifice, is the very last portion of his work as priest..." They refer to his mediatorial work in heaven as an "atoning ministry"

==== Pre-Advent Judgment ====
The pre-(Second) Advent judgment is a doctrine unique to Seventh-day Adventism. This judgment is the first phase of the final judgment and began on October 22, 1844. Adventists find the pre-Advent judgment portrayed in texts such as Daniel 7:9–10, 1 Peter 4:17 and Revelation 20:12. The purpose of this judgment is to vindicate those who have accepted salvation in the eyes of the onlooking universe, to prepare them for Jesus' imminent Second Coming, and to exonerate God's righteous character from the Devil's false accusations in the minds of all created beings. This judgment will distinguish true believers from those who falsely claim to be ones.

The biblical basis of the pre-Advent judgment teaching was challenged in 1980 by ex-Adventist professor Desmond Ford. (See Glacier View controversy.) The world church has officially reaffirmed its basic position on the doctrine since then. Still a minority progressive wing continues to be critical of the teaching. According to a 2002 worldwide survey, local church leaders estimated 86% of church members accept the doctrine.

==== The Seventh-day Sabbath ====
Worship Him who made Heaven and Earth the Sea and Springs of water.

In 1843, after reading a Seventh-day Baptist tract, Millerite Adventist Joseph Bates became convinced that there had been no Biblical change of the day of the Sabbath. He advocated the seventh-day Sabbath among Millerites.

Later, in Autumn of 1846, Bates shared with Hiram Edson and others about the Sabbath, and, after further Bible study, accepted their insights about the heavenly sanctuary. Bates understood Revelation 11:19 as pointing to the opening up of the Most Holy Place where the ark was located during 1844, and directing their attention to the Ark and its contents—the Ten Commandments—specifically the Seventh-day Sabbath. Bates published several small books on this topic. His teachings formed the platform that would become the core of SDA theology.

Seventh-day Adventists believe that God set the Sabbath "apart for the lofty purpose of enriching the divine-human relationship". The Sabbath repeatedly appears throughout the Bible. It is mentioned in the Creation account, at Sinai, in the ministry of Jesus in the ministries of the apostles. This a weekly celebration of Creation is also a symbol of salvation from sin. By keeping the Sabbath, Adventists show their loyalty to God. It is a time to spend with family, friends, and God.

While the ceremonial and sacrificial laws of the Pentateuch were fulfilled by the death of Jesus, the 10 commandments remain for Christian believers. The words of Jesus are foundational to this conviction:

"Do not think that I have come to abolish the Law or the Prophets; I have not come to abolish them but to fulfill them. I tell you the truth, until heaven and earth disappear, not the smallest letter, not the least stroke of a pen, will by any means disappear from the Law until everything is accomplished. Anyone who breaks one of the least of these commandments and teaches others to do the same will be called least in the kingdom of heaven, but whoever practices and teaches these commands will be called great in the kingdom of heaven. For I tell you that unless your righteousness surpasses that of the Pharisees and the teachers of the law, you will certainly not enter the kingdom of heaven." Matthew 5:17–20

Adventists believe that the Sabbath is not just another holiday but rather is intended as a rest from labor to support ourselves and trust in God for support but also for believers to grow spiritually. Seventh-day Adventists do not believe that they are saved by keeping Saturday as the Sabbath, but they attach great significance to Saturday-Sabbath keeping. Adventists do not see the Sabbath as a works-based doctrine, but rather that righteousness comes solely through faith in Jesus alone. The Sabbath commandment is seen as an act of faith in God's ideal for the believer, although its significance may not be seen by non-believers. They believe that the Sabbath is a whole day dedicated for worship and fellowship with believers, laying aside non-religious projects and labor.

Second Angel

Adventists see the second message as a warning to all of God's people in the world that there is a great and mighty pseudo-Christian power - symbolically called Babylon the Great - that will try to force everyone to disobey the word of God. It is portrayed as a woman on whose forehead is written: Mystery! Babylon the Great! The Mother of Idolaters, The Detestable of the Earth. Revelation 17:5 An angel cries out: Babylon the great is fallen and has become the dwelling place of demons. Revelation 18:2 Its pretense is very convincing so that it takes awareness and discernment to keep from being deceived or forced into abandoning faith in Gods word and his commandments. A voice from heaven calls out: Come out of her my people! Revelation 18:4 This call to come out of Babylon is recognition that Jesus has followers in all churches - He is not content to leave them where his commandments are not observed.

Third Angel

SDAs believe that the Third Angel's Message is God's final appeal to mankind and the warning of a universal test, prompting the inhabitants of earth to make a choice. Everyone will make a choice in support of, or in opposition to, the beast and his image. While the Seal of God is only on the forehead, the Mark of the Beast is on the forehead and the hand. SDAs understand these to not be literal marks, but spiritual indicators of allegiance to each power. The mark on the hand indicates that by labor one supports the beast and its image, while on the forehead it indicates that by beliefs or personal convictions one supports them.

Bates stated what would become the SDA grasp of the mark of the beast. Starting with Revelation 12:17 that God would have a last-day remnant keeping "the commandments of God," he stated that "there will yet be a mighty struggle about the restoring and keeping [of] the seventh-day Sabbath, that will test every living soul that enters the gates of the city"

The people of God would be "persecuted for keeping the commandments" by those deluded by having the mark of the beast. Bates stated while examining Revelation 14:9-12, "that the first day of the week for the Sabbath or holy day is a mark of the beast [?]" Only two groups would be alive on earth in the end times-those who have the mark of the beast and those who keep the commandments of God, including the seventh-day Sabbath. Given such an understanding, it is of little wonder that Bates had concluded early in 1847 "that God's holy Sabbath is a present truth"

=== Unity and variation ===
A 2002 survey of Adventists worldwide showed 91% acceptance of the following beliefs:

Results from 2002 Survey
Doctrine	Percentage of Adventists who agree
Sabbath	96%
Second coming	93%
Soul sleep	93%
Sanctuary and 1844	86% (35% believe there may be more than one interpretation of this doctrine)
Authority of Ellen White	81% (50% see a need for modern reinterpretation of White's writings)
Salvation through Christ alone	95%
Creation in 6 days	93%

A "Valuegenesis" study in 2000 of students at Adventist high schools in North America showed a generally high acceptance of the church's beliefs, with some such as marriage within the same faith, the remnant, Ellen White's gift of prophecy, and the investigative judgment with acceptance rates less than 63% percent. "In looking at the research this may be because over the first ten years of Valuegenesis research, fewer young people were reading their Bibles and Ellen White. And for a church that values a written revelation of God, less reading of the Bible probably means less understanding of its beliefs."

In a 1985 questionnaire, the percentage of North American Adventist lecturers who nominated various beliefs as contributions they believed Adventists had made to contemporary theology are:

Results from 1985 questionnaire of North American Adventist Theologians
Doctrine	Percentage contribution
Wholism	36%
Eschatology	29%
Sabbath	21%
Great Controversy	18%
Sanctuary	15%
(None)	11%
Salvation	9%
Scriptural interpretation	7%
Mission theology	4%
Health	4%

==== Theological spectrum ====
A theological spectrum exists within Adventism, with several different theological streams existing alongside the mainstream. The conservative "historic" movement holds to certain traditional positions that have been challenged since the 1950s. By contrast, those who consider themselves progressive Adventists typically question some of the church's distinctive teachings, and some of the fundamental beliefs of the church that are held by mainstream Adventists.

In a 1985 survey of North American Adventist lecturers, 45% described themselves as liberal compared to other church members, 40% as mainstream, 11% as conservative, and 4% gave no response to the question. There are two main organizations of Adventist scholars or interested laypeople. The Adventist Theological Society describes its beliefs as "balanced and conservative Adventist theology", whereas the Adventist Society for Religious Studies is more progressive by comparison.

Jon Paulien has identified four brands of Adventism – evangelists and frontier missionaries whose beliefs are traditional yet creatively expressed, scholars concerned with an accurate understanding of the Bible, the typical church member (including most of the younger, postmodern generation) who is most concerned with what is relevant to ordinary life and not concerned with most doctrines, and those in the Third World who are similarly concerned for a minimal belief set and passionate about their faith.

==== Regional and cultural differences ====
There is a common perception that different cultures and regions of the world vary in their theology.

According to Edwin Hernández, the principal investigator of the AVANCE study into Latino Adventists in the North American Division, "There was a very high degree (95 percent) of fidelity to the orthodox teachings of the church."

All of these doctrines, with the exception of item 11 (regarding the premillennial return of Christ), are widely held amongst conservative or evangelical Protestants. (Different Protestant groups hold varying views on the millennium.)

Regarding salvation, a major statement was the 1980 "The Dynamics of Salvation ".

== Distinctive doctrines ==
Seventh-day Adventists have often focused on those doctrines which are distinctive to Adventism. This was particularly true in the early days of the movement, when it was assumed that most people the church witnessed to were already Christian, and that they already understood the gospel.

=== Sabbath and the Biblical Law ===
==== Biblical Law and the Ten Commandments ====
Seventh-day Adventists believe that "the great principles of God's law are embodied in the Ten Commandments", and that these are "binding upon all people in every age" (Fundamental Belief no. 19). While the ceremonial and sacrificial laws of the Old Testament were fulfilled by the death of Jesus Christ, the 10 commandments are held to remain in force for Christian believers. The words of Jesus Christ in Matthew 5:17–20 are foundational to this conviction:

"Do not think that I have come to abolish the Law or the Prophets; I have not come to abolish them but to fulfill them. I tell you the truth, until heaven and earth disappear, not the smallest letter, not the least stroke of a pen, will by any means disappear from the Law until everything is accomplished. Anyone who breaks one of the least of these commandments and teaches others to do the same will be called least in the kingdom of heaven, but whoever practices and teaches these commands will be called great in the kingdom of heaven. For I tell you that unless your righteousness surpasses that of the Pharisees and the teachers of the law, you will certainly not enter the kingdom of heaven."

==== The Seventh-Day Sabbath ====
Seventh-day Adventists believe that the seventh day of the week, Saturday, is the biblical Sabbath which God set "apart for the lofty purpose of enriching the divine-human relationship". The Sabbath is a recurring message in the Bible, mentioned in the Creation account, at Sinai, in the ministry of Jesus Christ and in the ministries of the apostles. The Sabbath serves as a weekly memorial to Creation and is a symbol of redemption, from both Egypt and sin. By keeping the Sabbath, Adventists are reminded of the way that God can make them holy, like he did the Sabbath, and they show their loyalty to God by keeping the commandment in the Decalogue. The Sabbath is also a time for Adventists to spend with other people and with God.

Adventists believe that the Sabbath is not just a holiday but rather is intended as a rest for believers to grow spiritually. Although Seventh-day Adventists do not believe that they are saved by keeping Saturday as the Sabbath, they attach considerably greater significance to Saturday-Sabbath keeping than other denominations attach to worship on Sunday.

Adventists do not see salvation as a works-based doctrine, but rather righteousness comes solely through faith in Christ alone. The Sabbath commandment is seen as an act of faith in God's ideal for the believer, although its significance may not be seen by non-believers.

They believe that the Sabbath is a whole day dedicated for worship and fellowship with believers, laying aside non-religious projects and labor.

Seventh-day Adventists teach that there is no evidence of the Sabbath being changed to Sunday in the Bible. They teach instead that it was changed by gradual acceptance of Sunday worship gatherings which came into the early church in Rome to distinguish Christians from the Jews and to align Christianity with political authorities. This change became more universally accepted with the establishment of Roman emperor Constantine's Sunday law of 321 AD and the decree at the Council of Laodicea that in canon 29 declared that Christians should avoid work on Sunday.

==== The Great Controversy ====
Seventh-day Adventists believe that prior to the beginning of human history, a challenge occurred in heaven between God and Lucifer (Satan) over "the character of God, His law, and His sovereignty over the universe" (Fundamental Belief no. 8). Lucifer was subsequently cast out of heaven, and, acting through the serpent in the Garden of Eden, led Adam and Eve into sin. God has permitted Lucifer's rebellion to continue on Earth in order to demonstrate to angels and beings on other worlds that his Law is righteous and necessary, and that the breaking of the 10 commandments leads to moral catastrophe.

This understanding of the origin of evil is derived from the Bible (see Rev. 12:4–9; Isa. 14:12–14; Eze. 28:12–18; Gen. 3; Rom. 1:19–32; 5:12–21; 8:19–22; Gen. 6–8; 2 Peter 3:6; 1 Cor. 4:9; Heb. 1:14.). The book entitled The Great Controversy by Ellen G. White, particularly chapter 29, The Origin of Evil shows how this dispute originated.

=== Heavenly Sanctuary and Pre-Advent Judgment ===
==== The Heavenly Sanctuary ====
The Seventh-day Adventist church teaches that there is a sanctuary in heaven which was foreshadowed by the Mosaic tabernacle, according to their interpretation of the Epistle to the Hebrews chapters 8 and 9. After his death, resurrection and ascension, Jesus Christ entered the heavenly sanctuary as the great High Priest, "making available to believers the benefits of His atoning sacrifice" (Fundamental Belief no. 24). Adventists hold that Christ ministered his blood in the first section of the sanctuary (the holy place) until October 1844; after that time he entered the second section of the sanctuary (the Most Holy Place, or Holy of Holies) in fulfillment of the Day of Atonement.

Adventists therefore believe that Christ's work of atonement encompasses both his death on the Cross and his ministration in the heavenly sanctuary

Seventh-day Adventists have always believed in a complete atonement that is not completed.

— W. G. C. Murdock, SDA Theological Seminary Dean, 1980, Discussion, General Conference Session, Dallas

Venden points out that the atonement must have been complete at the cross—the sacrifice was sufficient. For when Jesus died for man's sin, it was enough to purchase man's salvation and man cannot add anything to it. Yet, the atonement involves more than just sacrifice. The process of redemption, the restoration of man's broken relationship to at-one-ment with God, was not completed at the cross, else there would be no more sin or suffering. It is the winning of men back to a love relationship with God that is not yet completed.

Early Adventists emphasized the two parts to the atonement:

[Christ] ascended on high to be our only mediator in the sanctuary in Heaven, where, with his own blood he makes atonement for our sins; which atonement so far from being made on the cross, which was but the offering of the sacrifice, is the very last portion of his work as priest..."

— Fundamental Principles taught and practiced by the Seventh-day Adventists, proposition II (1872)

They refer to his mediatorial work in heaven as an "atoning ministry" (as in Fundamental Belief no. 24).

==== Investigative Judgment ====
Most Christians believe in a judgement that comes before Christ separates the saints from the sinners, at the Second Coming which is a common belief. The investigative judgment gives when this judgement begins among Gods people and is a doctrine unique to Seventh-day Adventism, and teaches that the judgment of God's professed people began on October 22, 1844, when Christ entered the Holy of Holies in the heavenly sanctuary. Adventists find the investigative judgment portrayed in texts such as Daniel 7:9–10, 1 Peter 4:17 and Revelation 20:12. The purpose of this judgment is to vindicate the saints before the onlooking universe, to prepare them for Christ's imminent Second Coming, and to demonstrate God's righteous character in His dealings with humanity. This judgment will also separate true believers from those who falsely claim to be ones.

The biblical basis of the investigative judgment teaching was challenged in 1980 by ex-Adventist professor Desmond Ford. (See Glacier View controversy.) While the church has officially reaffirmed its basic position on the doctrine since 1980, many of those within the church's progressive wing continue to be critical of the teaching. According to a 2002 worldwide survey, local church leaders the majority estimated at 86% of church members accept the doctrine.

=== Eschatology ===
==== The Remnant Church ====
The Seventh-day Adventist church regards itself as the "remnant" of Revelation 12:17 (KJV). The Remnant church "announces the arrival of the judgment hour, proclaims salvation through Christ, and heralds the approach of His second advent" (Fundamental Belief no. 13). The duty of the Remnant is summed up in the "Three Angels' Messages" of Revelation 14:6–12, and its two distinguishing marks are seventh-day Sabbath observance and the Spirit of Prophecy (see below).

At baptism, Adventists may be asked the following question: "Do you accept and believe that the Seventh-day Adventist Church is the remnant church of Bible prophecy and that people of every nation, race, and language are invited and accepted into its fellowship?" (NB. In 2005 an alternative set of baptismal vows was created, which does not contain a reference to the Adventist church as the remnant. Candidates may now choose whether to take the original vow or the new one.)

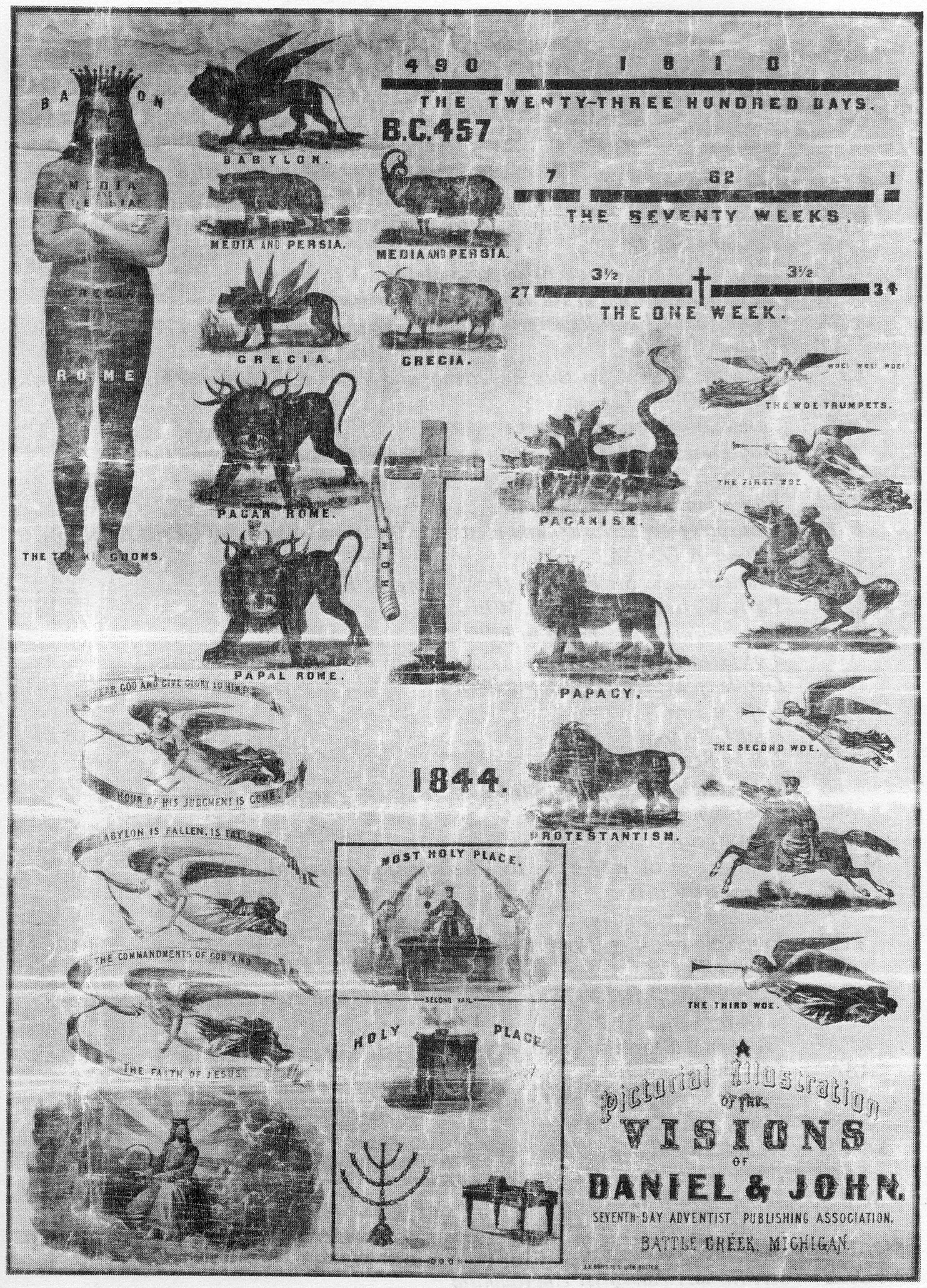
Seventh-day Adventist prophetic time chart from 1863, about the prophecies of Daniel and Revelation

==== Second coming of Christ ====
Seventh-day Adventists believe in an imminent, universally visible Second Coming of Christ, which will be preceded by a "time of trouble". The teaching that Christ will be universally visible is based on Revelation 1:7 which states that "every eye will see him." The second coming will coincide with the resurrection and translation of the righteous, as described in 1 Thessalonians 4:16. Adventists believe that the unrighteous, or wicked, will be raised after the millennium.

As compared to other Christian views of eschatology, the Seventh-day Adventist view is closest to Historic (or post-tribulational) Premillennialism. Conditions on earth are expected to steadily deteriorate until the "time of trouble" The Great Controversy (which is similar to the Great Tribulation of classic premillennialist teaching), when civil and religious authorities will combine to unleash intense persecution upon God's people, particularly those who keep the seventh-day Sabbath. The time of trouble will be ended by the glorious appearing of Christ, which will also mark the commencement of the millennium.

Adventists reject dispensationalist theology and the pretribulation rapture, believing that the church will remain on earth throughout the end-time crisis. A further difference is that the millennial reign of Christ will take place in heaven, not on earth, and will involve all of the redeemed people of God, not just national Israel (See Fundamental Beliefs, no. 26 & 27.)

Seventh-day Adventism interprets the book of Revelation using the historicist method, but also holds that some of the events it predicts are still future (see: interpretations of the Book of Revelation).

==== Hell and the state of the dead ====
Seventh-day Adventists believe that death is a state of unconscious sleep until the resurrection. They base this belief on biblical texts such as Ecclesiastes 9:5 which states "the dead know nothing", and 1 Thessalonians 4:13–18 which contains a description of the dead being raised from the grave at the second coming. These verses, it is argued, indicate that death is only a period or form of slumber.

Adventists teach that the resurrection of the righteous will take place at the second coming of Jesus, while the resurrection of the wicked will occur after the millennium of Revelation 20. They reject the traditional doctrine of hell as a state of everlasting conscious torment, believing instead that the wicked will be permanently destroyed after the millennium. The theological term for this teaching is Annihilationism.

The Adventist views about death and hell reflect an underlying belief in: (a) conditional immortality (or conditionalism), as opposed to the immortality of the soul; and (b) the holistic (or monistic) Christian anthropology or nature of human beings, as opposed to bipartite or tripartite views. Adventist education hence strives to be holistic in nature, involving not just the mind but all aspects of a person.

This belief in conditional immortality has been one of the doctrines used by critics (particularly in the past) to claim that the church is not a mainstream Christian denomination. However, this view is becoming more mainstream within evangelicalism, as evidenced by the British Evangelical Alliance ACUTE report, which states the doctrine is a "significant minority evangelical view" which has "grown within evangelicalism in recent years". Evangelical theologian and conditionalist Clark Pinnock suggests Adventist Le Roy Edwin Froom's The Conditionalist Faith of our Fathers, 2 vols., is "a classic defense on conditionalism".

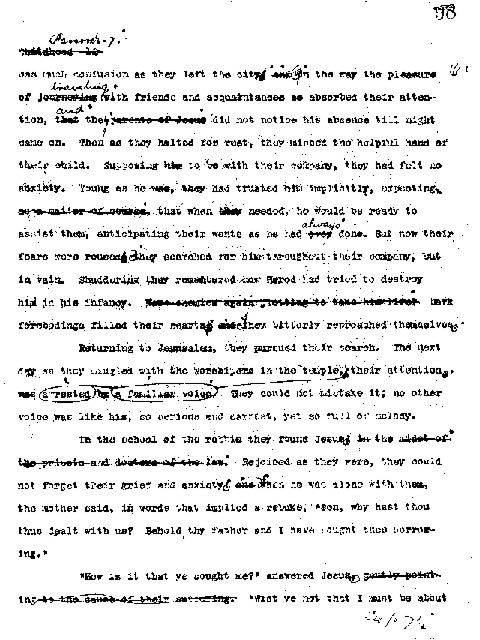
Portion of working pages 80–81 of Desire of Ages, with editorial handwriting from one of Ellen White's literary assistants

Adventists believe there is a reward of the wicked and sinners, the lake of fire, that will eternally destroy them and they along with all evil will cease to exist, and is the hell we are shown by scripture.

=== Spirit of Prophecy ===
The church believes the spiritual gift of prophecy was manifested in the ministry of Ellen White, whose writings are sometimes referred to as the "Spirit of Prophecy". The church's 28 Fundamental Beliefs state:

"her writings are a continuing and authoritative source of truth which provide for the church comfort, guidance, instruction, and correction. They also make clear that the Bible is the standard by which all teaching and experience must be tested."

Two other official statements regarding the prophetic ministry of Ellen White have recently been voted at General Conference Sessions. The June 1995 document A Statement of Confidence in the Spirit of Prophecy states that White "did the work of a prophet, and more", and that her writings "carry divine authority, both for godly living and for doctrine"; and recommended that "as a church we seek the power of the Holy Spirit to apply to our lives more fully the inspired counsel contained in the writings of Ellen G White." The 2005 document Resolution on the Spirit of Prophecy called upon "Seventh-day Adventists throughout the world to prayerfully study her writings, in order to understand more fully God's purpose for His remnant people", describing her writings as "theological stimulus".

There has been an increasing tendency in the church to view White in more human terms, although still inspired. Whatever the prominence assigned to her writings for doctrinal authority, Adventists are agreed that the Bible takes precedence as the final authority.

"In many ways the philosophical assumptions and presuppositions of our worldview are different from traditional Christianity and bring different perspectives on some of these old issues. We do not accept the traditional Platonic dualistic worldview and metaphysics that were foundational to the church fathers' theology of the Trinity, one of these being the concept of the immortality of the soul."

One Adventist sociology professor has described the Adventist view as follows:

"In spite of its clear monotheistic ring, the biblical account seems uncompromised on the idea of God as a group. While God has been declared to be one God (Deut. 6:4,1 Tim. 2:5), He has also been presented as a plurality of beings (1 John 5:7; Matthew 28:19; Ephesians 4:5)....What the notion of a triune (group) God seems to suggest is that the three members of the Godhead become joined in their relationship with each other, on the basis of their common purpose, values and interests."

Not all Seventh-day Adventist Trinitarian teachers are agreed on this subject. Max Hatton is a Seventh-day Adventist minister who has authored "Understanding the Trinity" and "The Trinity Doctrine for Seventh-day Adventists. He disagrees with the view of God as a plurality of beings.

Church Pioneer leadership taught that the Trinity is an Early Christian Church error: "This doctrine of the trinity was brought into the church about the same time with image worship, and keeping the day of the sun, and is but Persian doctrine remodeled. It occupied about three hundred years from its introduction to bring the doctrine to what it is now. It was commenced about 325 A. D., and was not completed till 681. See Milman's Gibbon's Rome, vol. iv, p.422. It was adopted in Spain in 589, in England in 596, in Africa in 534. - Gib. vol. iv, pp.114,345; Milner, vol. i, p.519.” {J. N. Loughborough, Review & Herald, November 5, 1861} Also, their contemporary, Ellen White, the Pioneer founder held to be an inspired Prophet by the present-day Church never disagreed with this position, and was never shown to be trinitarian from any of her published writings.

Despite their problematic history with this evangelical doctrine, the denomination has been "officially" Trinitarian for several decades, since 1980. However, there is a growing resurgence of individuals within the church who argue that the authentic, historical Adventist position is non-trinitarian.

=== Jesus Christ, the Son of God ===
Seventh-day Adventists now believe that Jesus Christ, the Son of God, "became incarnate in Jesus Christ. Through Him all things were created, the character of God is revealed, the salvation of humanity is accomplished, and the world is judged. Forever truly God, He became also truly human, Jesus the Christ. He was conceived of the Holy Spirit and born of the virgin Mary. He lived and experienced temptation as a human being, but perfectly exemplified the righteousness and love of God. By His miracles He manifested God's power and was attested as God's promised Messiah. He suffered and died voluntarily on the cross for our sins and in our place, was raised from the dead, and ascended to heaven to minister in the heavenly sanctuary on our behalf. He will come again in glory for the final deliverance of His people and the restoration of all things (Isa. 53:4–6; Dan. 9:25–27; Luke 1:35; John 1:1–3, 14; 5:22; 10:30; 14:1–3, 9, 13; Rom. 6:23; 1 Cor. 15:3, 4; 2 Cor. 3:18; 5:17–19; Phil. 2:5–11; Col. 1:15–19; Heb. 2:9–18; 8:1, 2). (Taken from "Seventh-day Adventists BELIEVE—An exposition of the fundamental beliefs of the Seventh-day Adventist Church".) Ellen White wrote: “Who is Christ?--He is the only begotten Son of the living God. He is to the Father as a word that expresses the thought,--as a thought made audible. Christ is the word of God.” {E. G. White, The Youth’s Instructor, June 28, 1894 par. 9}

=== Holy Spirit ===
As the early Adventists came from many different traditions, there was diversity in their views of the Holy Spirit. Few held an impersonal view of the Spirit, as emanating from God, or only a "power" or "influence". However, the main emphasis at this time was on Adventist distinctives, not on topics such as the Holy Spirit.

J. H. Waggoner called it "that awful and mysterious power which proceeds from the throne of the universe". Uriah Smith similarly described it as "a mysterious influence emanating from the Father and the Son, their representative and the medium of their power" and a "divine afflatus".

In repeatedly identifying the Holy Spirit with Jesus Christ Ellen White wrote: "“The Holy Spirit is the Spirit of Christ,” — (E.G. White, 14MR 84.3) And, “We want the Holy Spirit, which is Jesus Christ.” — (E.G. White, Lt66, April 10, 1894) Some scholars have denied that Ellen White was a major influence in the Adventist shift toward Trinitarian doctrine.

=== The human nature of Jesus Christ ===
Since the middle of the 20th century, there has been ongoing debate within Adventism concerning the nature of Jesus Christ, specifically whether Jesus Christ took on a fallen or an unfallen nature in the Incarnation. This was precipitated by the publication of Questions on Doctrine in 1957 which some Adventists felt did not agree with what the church held.

The debate revolves around the interpretation of several biblical texts:

"For God has done what the law, weakened by the flesh, could not do. By sending his own Son in the likeness of sinful flesh and for sin, he condemned sin in the flesh." Romans 8:3 (ESV)

"For we have not an high priest which cannot be touched with the feeling of our infirmities; but was in all points tempted like as we are, yet without sin." Hebrews 4:15 (KJV)

"...concerning his Son (Jesus), who was descended from David according to the flesh..." Romans 1:3 (ESV)

"Therefore, in all things He had to be made like His brethren, that He might be a merciful and faithful High Priest in things pertaining to God, to make propitiation for the sins of the people." Hebrews 2:17 NKJV

According to Adventist historian George Knight, most early Adventists (until 1950) believed that Jesus Christ was born with a human nature that was not only physically frail and subject to temptation, but that he also had sinful inclinations and desires. Since 1950, the "historic" wing of the church continues to hold this fallen view of Christ's human nature.

Adventists since 1950 believe that Jesus was made in the "likeness of sinful flesh," as He inherited the fallen Sinful human nature of Adam, This in no way indicates that Jesus Christ was a sinner, or participated in sinful acts or thoughts. Though being in human nature sinful - as Man is, He remained sinless in life and His sinlessness is beyond questioning. He took our nature with its physical and mental weaknesses and was tempted on all points as we are. Christ was tested by temptation, but did not have ungodly desires and resultant sinful inclinations.

Ellen White states: "Those who claim that it was not possible for Christ to sin, cannot believe that He really took upon Himself human nature. But was not Christ actually tempted, not only by Satan in the wilderness, but all through His life, from childhood to manhood? In all points He was tempted as we are, and because He successfully resisted temptation under every form, He gave man the perfect example, and through the ample provision Christ has made, we may become partakers of the divine nature, having escaped the corruption which is in the world through lust."

The controversy within Adventism over Christ's human nature is linked to the debate over whether it is possible for a "last generation" of Christian believers to achieve a state of sinless perfection. These matters were discussed at the Questions on Doctrine 50th Anniversary Conference. Both points of view are currently represented at the Biblical Research Institute.

According to Woodrow W. Whidden II (himself a supporter of the "unfallen" position), proponents of the view that Christ possessed a "fallen" nature include M. L. Andreasen, Joe Crews, Herbert Douglass, Robert J. Wieland, Thomas Davis, C. Mervyn Maxwell, Dennis Priebe, Bobby Gordon and Ralph Larson. Proponents of the view that Christ's nature was "unfallen" include Edward Heppenstall, Hans K. LaRondelle, Raoul Dederen, Norman Gulley, R. A. Anderson, Leroy E. Froom and W. E. Read.

== Other doctrinal issues ==
=== Soteriology ===
==== Original sin ====
Seventh-day Adventists have historically preached a doctrine of inherited weakness, but not a doctrine of inherited guilt. Adventists believe that humans are sinful primarily due to the fall of Adam, but they do not accept the Augustinian/Calvinistic understanding of original sin, taught in terms of original guilt. According to Augustine and Calvin, humanity inherits not only Adam's depraved nature but also the actual guilt of his transgression, and Adventists look more toward the Wesleyan model.

In part, the Adventist position on original sin reads:

"The nature of the penalty for original sin, i.e., Adam's sin, is to be seen as literal, physical, temporal, or actual death – the opposite of life, i.e., the cessation of being. By no stretch of the scriptural facts can death be spiritualised as depravity. God did not punish Adam by making him a sinner. That was Adam’s own doing. All die the first death because of Adam’s sin regardless of their moral character – children included."

The early Adventists (such as George Storrs and Uriah Smith) wrote articles that de-emphasise the morally corrupt nature inherited from Adam, while stressing the importance of actual, personal sins committed by the individual. They thought of the "sinful nature" in terms of physical mortality rather than moral depravity. Traditionally, Adventists look at sin in terms of willful transgressions. They base their belief on texts such as "Whosoever committeth sin transgresseth also the law: for sin is the transgression of the law." (1 John 3:4)

==== Soteriology and free will ====
The Seventh-day Adventist church stands in the Wesleyan tradition (which in turn is an expression of Arminianism) in regard to its soteriological teachings. Wesley's views are opposed to the Augustinian/Tridentine version of justification which understood divine acquittal and forgiveness as the fruit of an infused righteousness.

This is significant in two respects. Firstly, there is a strong emphasis in Adventist teaching on sanctification as a necessary and inevitable consequence of salvation in Christ. Such an emphasis on obedience is not considered to detract from the reformation principle of sola fide ("faith alone"), but rather to provide an important balance to the doctrine of justification by faith, and to guard against antinomianism. While asserting that Christians are saved entirely by the grace of God, Adventists also stress obedience to the law of God as the proper response to salvation.

Secondly, Adventist teaching strongly emphasises free will; each individual is free either to accept or reject God's offer of salvation. Adventists therefore oppose the Calvinistic/Reformed doctrines of predestination (or unconditional election), limited atonement and perseverance of the saints ("once saved always saved"). Questions on Doctrine stated that Adventists believe "That man is free to choose or reject the offer of salvation through Christ; we do not believe that God has predetermined that some men shall be saved and others lost." The freedom of each individual to accept or reject God is integral to the Great Controversy theme.

"God could have prevented sin by creating a universe of robots that would do only what they were programmed to do. But God's love demanded that He create beings who could respond freely to His love—and such a response is possible only from beings who have the power of choice."

Assurance of salvation in Christ is part of the official beliefs, and an estimated 69% of Adventists "Have assurance of salvation", according to a 2002 worldwide survey of local church leaders.

==== Sinless perfection ====
The question of whether Christians can overcome sin and achieve a state of sinless perfection is a controversial topic for Seventh-day Adventists, as it is among the holiness movement and Pentecostalism. Mainstream Adventists hold that Christ is our example and shows mankind the path to overcome sin, and to manifest Christ's perfect and righteous character. They hold to the 28 Fundamental Beliefs of Seventh-day Adventists which in #10 states 'we are given the power to live a holy life' and right before that 'we are born again and sanctified' through the Holy Spirit. Ellen White wrote that the saints through faith in Christ would reach a state such as Adam before the Fall, and refers in many of her writings that through Christ, He made it possible to overcome sin.

In his book The Sanctuary Service (1947), M. L. Andreasen taught that sinless perfection can be achieved; his theology continues to be influential among Adventists. Some Adventists insist that a final generation of believers, who will live through the "time of trouble" (between the close of probation and second coming of Christ), who receive the seal of God mentioned in Revelation 7:3, must and will attain a state of sinlessness comparable to the pre-fall condition of Adam and Eve. They believe that historically this is the authentic Adventist position on the issue as taught by Ellen White, and that denominational leaders along with Progressive Adventists, have erred in moving away from it. Larry Kirkpatrick and the "Last Generation" movement www.LastGenerationTheology.org—The Final Atonement is Now Underway are representative of this stream of teaching. Such quote various texts such as

Now, while our great High Priest is making the atonement for us, we should seek to be-come perfect in Christ. Not even by a thought could our Saviour be brought to yield to the power of temptation. Satan finds in human hearts some point where he can gain a foot-hold; some sinful desire is cherished, by means of which his temptations assert their power. But Christ declared of Himself: ‘The prince of this world cometh, and hath nothing in Me.’ John 14:30. Satan could find nothing in the Son of God that would enable him to gain the victory. He had kept His Father’s commandments, and there was no sin in Him that Satan could use to his advantage. This is the condition in which those must be found who shall stand in the time of trouble.

— The Great Controversy, Ellen White, p. 623

The ideal of Christian character is Christlikeness. As the Son of man was perfect in His life, so His followers are to be perfect in their life. Jesus was in all things made like unto His brethren. He became flesh, even as we are. He was hungry and thirsty and weary. He was sustained by food and refreshed by sleep. He shared the lot of man; yet He was the blameless Son of God. He was God in the flesh. His character is to be ours. The Lord says of those who believe in Him, "I will dwell in them, and walk in them; and I will be their God, and they shall be My people." 2 Cor. 6:16.

Christ is the ladder that Jacob saw, the base resting on the earth, and the topmost round reaching to the gate of heaven, to the very threshold of glory. If that ladder had failed by a single step of reaching the earth, we should have been lost. But Christ reaches us where we are. He took our nature and overcame, that we through taking His nature might overcome. Made "in the likeness of sinful flesh" (Rom. 8:3), He lived a sinless life. Now by His divinity He lays hold upon the throne of heaven, while by His humanity He reaches us. He bids us by faith in Him attain to the glory of the character of God. Therefore are we to be perfect, even as our "Father which is in heaven is perfect."

— The Desire of Ages. Ellen White, Page 311-312

Are we striving with all our God-given powers to reach the measure of the stature of men and women in Christ? Are we seeking for His fullness, ever reaching higher and higher, trying to attain to the perfection of His character? When God’s servants reach this point, they will be sealed in their foreheads. The recording angel will declare, “It is done.” They will be complete in Him whose they are by creation and by redemption.

— "Selected Messages 3", Ellen White, p. 427

However, some Adventist theologians such as Edward Heppenstall have argued the view that this state of absolute sinlessness or perfection is not possible in this life, and that Christians will always rely on forgiving grace—even after the "close of probation". It is argued that "perfection" in the Bible refers to spiritual maturity, having "the continual counteracting presence of the Holy Spirit" to be "victorious over sin and the sinful nature within us", as opposed to absolute sinlessness.

=== Ministry and worship ===
==== Ordination of women ====
The Adventist Church world church does not support the ordination of women to ministry within its standard procedures. Instead women pastors in the denomination hold the title of "commissioned" rather than "ordained," which allows them to perform almost all of the pastoral functions their male colleagues perform but with a lesser title. This compromise was reached during the 1990s, with disagreement primarily occurring along cultural lines. Although the Seventh-day Adventist Church has no written policy forbidding the ordination of women, it has traditionally ordained only men. From its formation, Adventists traditionally held to the view that no precedent for the practice of ordaining women can be found in Scripture or in the writings of Ellen G. White and the early Seventh-day Adventist Church. However, in recent years the ordination of women has been the subject of heated debate, especially in North America and Europe. In the Adventist church, candidates for ordination are chosen by local conferences (which usually administer about 50–150 local congregations) and approved by unions (which serve about 6–12 conferences). The world headquarters—the General Conference—says that the GC has the right to set the worldwide qualifications for ordination, including gender requirements. GC leaders have never taken the position that ordination of women is contrary to the Bible, but they have insisted that no one ordain women until it is acceptable to all parts of the world church.

In 1990 the General Conference in world session voted not to establish a worldwide policy permitting the ordination of women, but they did not vote a policy forbidding such either. In 1995 GC delegates voted not to authorize each of the 13 world divisions to establish ordination policies specific to its part of the world. In 2010, the North American Division of the church voted to allow commissioned pastors to lead a Conference or Mission, as well as ordained ones. In 2011, the North American Division, without GC approval, voted to permit women to serve as conference presidents. In early 2012, the GC responded to the NAD action with an analysis of church history and policy, demonstrating that divisions do not have the authority to establish policy different from GC policy. The NAD immediately rescinded their action. But in their analysis the GC reminded the world membership that the “final responsibility and authority” for deciding who is ordained resides at the union level. This led to decisions by several unions to approve ordinations without regard to gender. In March 2012, several unions and conferences voted to support the ordination of women. These are the Mid America Union, the Pacific Union Conference, the Southeastern California conference, the Columbia Union, and the Potomac Conference.

On April 23, 2012, the North German Union voted to ordain women as ministers, but by late 2013 had not yet ordained a woman. On July 29, 2012, the Columbia Union Conference voted to "authorize ordination without respect to gender." On August 19, 2012, the Pacific Union Conference also voted to ordain without regard to gender. Both unions began immediately approving ordinations of women. By mid-2013, about 25 women had been ordained to the ministry in the Pacific Union Conference, plus several in the Columbia Union. On May 12, 2013, the Danish Union voted to treat men and women ministers the same, and to suspend all ordinations until after the topic is considered at the next GC session in 2015. On May 30, 2013, the Netherlands Union voted to ordain female pastors, recognizing them as equal to their male colleagues. On September 1, 2013, a woman was ordained in the Netherlands Union.

In 2012–2013 the General Conference assembled several committees to study the issue and make a recommendation to be voted at the 2015 world General Conference session.

On October 27, 2013, Sandra Roberts became the first woman to lead a Seventh-day Adventist conference when she was elected as president of the Southeastern California Conference. However, the worldwide Seventh-day Adventist church did not recognize this because presidents of conferences must be ordained pastors and the worldwide church did not recognize the ordination of women.

As Protestant Christians who accept the Bible as their only rule of faith and practice, Seventh-day Adventists on both sides of the issue employ the same Bible texts and arguments used by other Protestants (e.g. 1 Tim. 2:12 and Gal. 3:28), but the fact that the most prominent and authoritative co-founder of the church—Ellen White—was a woman, also affects the discussion. Proponents of ordaining women point out that Adventists believe that Ellen White was chosen by God as a leader, preacher and teacher; that she remains the highest authority, outside the Bible, in the Seventh-day Adventist Church today; that she was regularly issued ordination credentials, which she carried without objection; and that she supported the ordination of women to at least some ministry roles. Opponents argue that because she was a prophet her example does not count, and that although she said she was ordained by God, she was never ordained in the ordinary way, by church leaders.

On July 8, 2015, delegates to the General Conference Business Session, in San Antonio, Texas, voted 1,381–977 against allowing divisions the authority to ordain women. Ted N. C. Wilson, President of the General Conference, appealed to the world church to accept the decision, and also stated that "the vote means we maintain the current policy" (commissioning women, ordaining men as pastors).

In 2022, the Rocky Mountain Conference (RMC) approved ordaining women pastors.

==== Baptism ====
Seventh-day Adventists practice believer's baptism by full immersion in a similar manner to the Baptists. They argue that baptism requires knowing consent and moral responsibility. Hence, they do not baptize infants or children who do not demonstrate knowing consent and moral responsibility, but instead dedicate them, which is symbolic of the parents', the community's, and the church's gratefulness to God for the child, and their commitment to raising the child to love Jesus. Seventh-day Adventists believe that baptism is a public statement to commit one's life to Jesus and is a prerequisite for church membership. Baptism is only practiced after the candidate has gone through Bible lessons. According to the Bible, the act of baptism shows that the person has repented of sin and wishes to live a life in Christ (Acts 8:36–37).

==== Communion ====
Seventh-day Adventists believe that the bread and wine (grape juice) of the Communion Service are "symbols" of the body and blood of Jesus; however, Christ is also "present to meet and strengthen His people" in the experience of communion. Adventists practice "the ordinance of footwashing" prior to each celebration of the Lord's Supper, on account of the gospel account of John 13:1–16.

==== Spiritual gifts ====
The 17th fundamental belief of the church affirms that the spiritual gifts continue into the present.

Adventists generally believe the legitimate gift of tongues is of speaking unlearned human languages only, and are generally critical of the gift as practiced by charismatic and Pentecostal Christians today.

=== Creationism ===
The Seventh-day Adventist doctrine of creationism is based on believing that the opening chapters of Genesis should be interpreted as literal history. Adventist belief holds that all Earthly life originated during a six-day period some 6000 years ago, and a global flood destroyed all land based animals and humans except for those saved on Noah's Ark. Traditional Adventists oppose theories which propose interpreting the days of creation symbolically. Adventists reject the naturalistic views of abiogenesis and evolution.

Although Adventists hold that creation week was a recent event, they believe the Bible speaks of other worlds populated by intelligent beings elsewhere in the universe, which pre-existed the Earth's creation. The Seventh-day Adventist Ministerial Association's Seventh-day Adventists Believe (2005), explains that the opening chapters of Genesis describe a limited creation:

'The "heavens" of Genesis 1 and 2 probably refer to our sun and its system of planets. Indeed, the earth, instead of being Christ's first creation, was most likely His last one. The Bible pictures the sons of God, probably the Adams of all the unfallen worlds, meeting with God in some distant corner of the universe (Job 1:6–12). So far, space probes have discovered no other inhabited planets. They apparently are situated in the vastness of space—well beyond the reach of our sin-polluted solar system quarantined against the infection of sin.'

While the majority of Adventists believe that all biological life was originally created recently during a literal week, there is a range of positions amongst Adventists regarding when the inorganic material of the universe and planet Earth was created.

Some Adventists hold that the entire physical universe was created at the commencement of the literal Creation week, though it is generally recognised that the creation of angels and the conflict between Lucifer and God would need to have occurred prior to the Creation event described in Genesis 1. Other Adventists hold that the universe was created prior to the Creation week, but that planet Earth and its immediate surroundings were created de novo at the commencement of that week.

Another mainstream Adventist position is that the inorganic matter of planet Earth was created prior to the Creation week and was reshaped into its present inhabitable form during that week. All of these Adventist positions agree that the computed radiometric dates of standard geology are largely irrelevant to dating the creation of life on Earth. Clyde Webster calls radiometric dating an "interpretive science" with uncertainties. He stated that "it would seem logical, almost compelling to seriously consider other sources of data for determining the time of Creation" concluding that for a Christian scientist "such a primary source is the Holy Scripture."

Adventists were influential in the redevelopment of creationism in the 20th century. Seventh-day Adventist geologist George McCready Price was responsible for reviving flood geology in the early 20th century. He was quoted heavily by William Jennings Bryan in the Scopes Monkey Trial. His ideas were later borrowed by Henry Morris and John Whitcomb for their landmark 1961 creationist text The Genesis Flood. The Morris and Whitcomb position is distinct from Seventh-day Adventism because they postulate both a young earth and a young universe.

About the time that The Genesis Flood was having a large impact in the evangelical world, a number of progressive Adventist scholars educated in secular universities began promoting Theistic Evolution. Some Progressive Adventists no longer hold the literal view of Genesis 1. Other Adventist scholars have identified the consequences of moving away from understanding that the Creation week involved a recent literal week.

In 2009, the Seventh-day Adventist Church held an international creation emphasis day as part of a "worldwide denominational celebration of the biblical account of creation." The event was part of a church initiative to underscore its commitment to a literal creation model. In 2010, the World Seventh-day Adventist Church's highest ecclesiastical body, the World General Conference Session, officially reaffirmed the Church's position in support of a literal six-day creation week.

=== The scapegoat ===
Adventists teach that the scapegoat, or Azazel, is a symbol for Satan. They believe that Satan will finally have to bear the responsibility for the sins of the believers of all ages, and that this was foreshadowed on the Day of Atonement when the high priest confessed the sins of Israel over the head of the scapegoat (Leviticus 16:21).

This belief has drawn criticism from some Christians, who feel this gives Satan the status of sin-bearer alongside Jesus Christ. Adventists have responded by insisting that Satan is not a saviour, nor does he provide atonement for sin; Christ alone is the substitutionary sacrifice for sin, but holds no responsibility for it. In the final judgment, responsibility for sin is passed back to Satan who first caused mankind to sin. As the responsible party, Satan receives the wages for his sin and the sins of all the saved—namely, death. Thus, the unsaved are held responsible for their own sin, while the saved are no longer held responsible for theirs.

=== Sunday law ===
Traditionally, Adventists have taught there will be a time before the Second Advent in which the message of the Ten Commandments and in particular the keeping of the seventh day of the week, Saturday, as Sabbath will be conveyed to the whole world. Protestants and Catholics will unite to enforce legislation requiring the observance of Sunday worship. In reference to the creation of an Image to the Beast Revelation 13-17, Ellen G. White stated:

"When the leading churches of the United States, uniting on such points of doctrines as are held by them in common, shall influence the state to enforce their decrees and to sustain their institutions; then Protestant America will have formed an image of the Roman hierarchy, and the infliction of civil penalties upon dissenters will inevitably result." –Great Controversy p. 445

Jon Paulien maintains that the central issue of the "final crisis of earth’s history has to do with the Sabbath", based on the strong allusion of Revelation 14:7 to Exodus 20:11 (the Sabbath commandment of the Ten Commandments), and also other verses and themes in Revelation.

=== Three Angels’ Messages ===
From the time of the Second Great Awakening, the Millerite movement proclaimed the soon return of Jesus. Adventists have traditionally interpreted this as the initial proclamation of the three angels' messages. The "three angels' messages" is an interpretation of the messages given by three angels in Revelation 14:6–12. The Seventh-day Adventist church teaches that these messages are given to prepare the world for the second coming of Jesus Christ, and sees them as a central part of its own mission.

The Seventh-day Adventist Church has traditionally believed that it is the remnant church of Bible prophecy, and that its mission is to proclaim the three angels' messages.

"The universal church is composed of all who truly believe in Christ, but in the last days, a time of widespread apostasy, a remnant has been called out to keep the commandments of God and the faith of Jesus. This remnant announces the arrival of the judgment hour, proclaims salvation through Christ, and heralds the approach of His second advent. This proclamation is symbolized by the three angels of Revelation 14; it coincides with the work of judgment in heaven and results in a work of repentance and reform on earth. Every believer is called to have a personal part in this worldwide witness."
Fundamental Beliefs of the Seventh-day Adventist Church

"In accordance with God's uniform dealing with mankind, warning them of coming events that will vitally affect their destiny, He has sent forth a proclamation of the approaching return of Christ. This preparatory message is symbolized by the three angels’ messages of Revelation 14, and meets its fulfillment in the great Second Advent Movement today. This has brought forth the remnant, or Seventh-day Adventist Church, keeping the commandments of God and the faith of Jesus."
Seventh-day Adventist Church Manual

The Mission Statement of the church declares:

"The mission of the Seventh-day Adventist Church is to proclaim to all peoples the everlasting gospel of God's love in the context of the three angels' messages of Revelation 14:6–12, and as revealed in the life, death, resurrection, and high priestly ministry of Jesus Christ, leading them to accept Jesus as personal Saviour and Lord and to unite with His remnant church; and to nurture believers as disciples in preparation for His soon return."

Some critics and Progressive Adventists, typically reject the claim that the three angels' messages find unique fulfillment in the Seventh-day Adventist Church. Mainstream Adventists believe that God has led the Christian movements in history, but progressives tend to deny putting Adventism on that level.

== See also ==
- 28 Fundamental Beliefs (Adventist)
- Millerites
- List of Seventh-day Adventist hospitals
- List of Seventh-day Adventist medical schools
- List of Seventh-day Adventist secondary schools
- List of Seventh-day Adventist colleges and universities
