= Desmond Ford =

Australian theologian (1929–2019)

Personal details
- Born: 2 February 1929 Townsville, Queensland, Australia
- Died: 11 March 2019 (aged 90) Sunshine Coast, Queensland
- Spouse: Gwen Booth; Gillian ("Gill") Wastell
- Children: 3
- Occupation: Theologian
- Education: Australasian Missionary College

Desmond Ford (2 February 1929 – 11 March 2019) was an Australian theologian who studied evangelicalism.

Within the Seventh-day Adventist Church he was a controversial figure. He was dismissed from ministry in the Adventist church in 1980, following his critique of the church's investigative judgment teaching. He had since worked through the non-denominational evangelical ministry Good News Unlimited. Ford disagreed with some aspects of traditional Adventist end-time beliefs. However, he still defended a conservative view of scripture, the Seventh-day Sabbath, and a vegetarian lifestyle. He viewed the writings of Ellen G. White as useful devotionally, but not at the level of authority held by the Church.

Ford shared the sermon time at the Good News Unlimited congregation, which meets on Saturdays in the Brisbane suburb of Milton, and in periodic seminars on the eastern seaboard of Australia.

== Biography ==
=== Early life and conversion ===
Desmond Ford was born in Townsville, Queensland, Australia on 2 February 1929, to Wilfred Ford and Lillian Simpson. He had one brother, Val, who was three and a half years older. The Ford lineage consisted of farmers and cattlemen of English and Australian descent. The Simpson lineage derived from England, Ireland and China. Desmond's parents were nominal Anglican Christians, with his father almost an atheist in practice, and his mother presenting "a religious façade". Wilfred encouraged his son to read, beginning a lifelong obsession for the "unusually gifted" boy.

When Lillian was pregnant with Desmond, an Adventist book salesman shared insights on nutrition with the family, sparking a chain of events affecting Desmond's life. At an Adventist camp meeting in 1939 Desmond was given a Bible, whose reading he would complete three years later, around the time he finished primary school. However his parents divorced when he was nine; Wilfred moved to Canberra, and Lillian and the boys later moved to Sydney, New South Wales (NSW). He passed his Intermediate Certificate in 1943. However, due to the family's poverty and Australia's involvement in World War II, Desmond had to drop out of school. He became officially employed with Associated Newspapers at the age of 15, although he had started working there months earlier, and was promoted from copy boy to an editorial position, because of his published work. Meanwhile, Desmond took night classes for high school. All along, Desmond was being influenced by encounters with Adventists and other Christians, and steadily collected books on Christian theology, and the creation–evolution controversy.

Ford was challenged by the strict lifestyle standards presented in Ellen G. White's Messages to Young People, and gave up the cinema and reading fiction. Reading novels had been his main childhood hobby, and became replaced with reading theology. White's book The Great Controversy was a key influence on his conversion. In winter 1946 he publicly responded to a call for commitment to God's service. Ford was impressed by the Christian character of many of the Adventists who had nurtured him. In September he was officially baptised into the church. This was despite strong opposition from his brother; and his mother was also originally resistant to his conversion, having become disenchanted with the Adventist church herself. Ford resigned from his job, and returned briefly to Townsville with his family. He then left in 1947 for the Australasian Missionary College in the Lake Macquarie region of NSW, to train for the ministry.

=== Seminary ===
Ford found his time at Avondale exciting for spiritual growth. He was an active participant in class discussions, and occasionally taught classes to fill in for the lecturers. He was particularly inspired by Dr. William Murdoch, and carried out research for him. Ford gave talks in nearby churches, and published around a dozen articles for church magazines during this time. He also led students in Bible study. He struggled financially, and worked on Avondale's farm and elsewhere, and also selling Adventist books.

He graduated from the Ministerial Course in Avondale in 1950, with high marks.

=== Early ministry ===
Ford lived in a caravan (trailer) with his mother, who insisted on accompanying him, while canvassing (selling Christian books). Ford was sent to help build a new church in the coastal town of Coffs Harbour, NSW. In 1951, still in his first year of service as a pastor, he was sent to Newcastle, NSW, then an industrial city, to assist evangelist George Burnside. While Burnside was a dynamic presenter, Ford's biographer Milton Hook describes him as a fundamentalist (see: historic Adventism), and draws an analogy with a rugged, gung-ho cowboy, like a John Wayne character. Ford questioned him on some end-times interpretations, resulting in conflict between the pair – a sign of further things to come. Later he sold books in the Lake Macquarie and nearby Upper Hunter regions, which he found challenging work.

He worked as a pastor in various churches and as an evangelist for about 7 years in NSW, in Australian rural towns.

In 1952 Ford pastored the Coffs Harbour area, under a supervisor. His mother returned to Queensland. In December he married Gwen Booth, with whom he had shared a budding friendship and romance since their meeting at Avondale, where she studied teaching. Gwen had been raised in humble circumstances in Yass, and was a quiet achiever who cared about others, and had a deep faith in Jesus. The following year they moved to the country town of Quirindi, where Ford pastored the church. From 1954 to mid-1955, Ford pastored in the Gunnedah area, then moved north to Inverell. There a public debate with Burgin, a Church of Christ minister and a "formidable opponent" of Adventists, brought Ford respect. The topic was the Sabbath, with the specific title "Is the Seventh Day or the First Day Binding on Christians?" Arguably Ford won the debate. He later baptised some of Burgin's church members.

=== Return to Avondale ===
The South Pacific Division called him back to Avondale, to complete his ministry course. He completed a BA in 1958, and went on to complete a Master's degree in systematic theology at the SDA Washington Seminary in 1959. Ford subsequently received a PhD in the rhetorical analysis of Paul's letters from Michigan State University in 1961. In the same year he returned to Australia and became head of the Religion Department at Avondale College, where he would remain until 1977. At Avondale, Ford taught many classes, including public speaking, homiletics, and evangelism. He was a member of the Biblical Research Committee in Australia and the United States.

He completed his second PhD in 1972 from the University of Manchester, while on leave from teaching at Avondale. His supervisor was the renowned Protestant theologian F. F. Bruce. His field was New Testament studies, specifically eschatology (end times). Ford entitled his thesis, The Abomination of Desolation in Biblical Eschatology. His main expertise was biblical apocalyptic literature, such as Daniel and Revelation, and eschatology.

=== Tension over theology ===
Ford was a primary opponent of the perfectionism within the SDA church, especially its form as taught by fellow Australian Robert Brinsmead, a former classmate of Ford's at Avondale.

Ford believed that victory over the guilt of sin (justification) was provided at the cross, victory over the power of sin (sanctification) is the work of a lifetime and victory over the presence of sin (glorification) occurs at the return of Christ Jesus. Ford disagreed with the belief of sinless perfection, and did not hold to the belief that the saints are sealed at the end time, but held that the final removal of sin occurred when mortality changes to immortality at the return of Jesus Christ. Ford held that victory over the presence of sin does not occur during this lifetime, so sin continues among the saints up to the return of Jesus Christ.

Ford held that justification precedes sanctification, because victory over the guilt of sin, precedes victory over the power of sin. Ford taught that while justification is distinct from sanctification, the two concepts are always found together, in the same manner as two railway lines are distinct but never separate. Adventist belief places an equal emphasis on sanctification compared to justification, while still believing both are necessary for salvation.

Ford disagreed strongly with the belief of "eschatological perfectionism", which is the teaching that a final generation of believers must achieve a state of complete sinlessness (or Christlikeness) in the final period just before the second coming of Jesus, when the saints are sealed (see Last Generation Theology). Mainstream Adventists consider the life and character of Christ as a perfect example, that all must imitate.

Ford stepped into the debate within Adventism concerning the nature of Jesus Christ, specifically whether Jesus Christ took on a fallen or an unfallen human nature in the Incarnation. This was precipitated by the publication of Questions on Doctrine in 1957, which some Adventists felt did not agree with what the church held.

The debate revolves around the interpretation of several biblical texts:

"For God has done what the law, weakened by the flesh, could not do. By sending his own Son in the likeness of sinful flesh and for sin, he condemned sin in the flesh." Romans 8:3 (ESV)

"For we have not an High Priest which cannot be touched with the feelings of our infirmities, but was in all points tempted like as we are, yet without sin." Hebrews 4:15

"...concerning his Son (Jesus), who was descended from David according to the flesh..." Romans 1:3 (ESV)

"Therefore, in all things He had to be made like His brethren, that He might be a merciful and faithful High Priest in things pertaining to God, to make propitiation for the sins of the people." Hebrews 2:17 NKJV

and statements made by Ellen White:

"Notwithstanding that the sins of a guilty world were laid upon Christ, notwithstanding the humiliation of taking upon Himself our fallen nature, the voice from heaven declared Him to be the Son of the Eternal." The Desire of Ages, p. 112.

"He assumed human nature, with its infirmities, its liabilities, its temptations." Manuscript Releases, Vol. 17, p. 337.

"But Jesus Christ was the only begotten Son of God. He took upon Himself human nature, and was tempted in all points as human nature is tempted. He could have sinned; He could have fallen, but not for one moment was there in Him an evil propensity." Letter 8, 1895 in Manuscript Releases, Vol. 13, p. 18.

"Christ did not possess the same sinful, corrupt, fallen disloyalty we possess, for then He could not be a perfect offering." Review & Herald, 25 April 1893

According to Adventist historian George Knight, most early Adventists (until 1950) believed that Jesus Christ was born with a human nature that was not only physically frail and subject to temptation, but that he also had the fallen predisposition and inclination to sin. Since 1950, the "historic" wing of the church continues to hold this fallen view of Christ's human nature. Mainstream Adventists hold to the belief taught by Ellen White that He came with the effects of Adam's sin deep within his nature, that Christ took on the fallen nature but not the sinfulness of man.

In contrast to the "historic" view, Ford believed that Ellen White was clear that Christ took our infirmities and with the weaknesses of fallen man, the sinful nature in the sense of that he had a lessened capacity with respect to the fallen physical nature that he inherited from Adam, including physical weaknesses, frailties and mental, and moral degeneracy and deterioration. While Christ was tempted as all other human beings are, Ford noted that the lessened capacity of his human nature did not ever include giving in to temptation or having any evil desires or propensity or predisposition towards sin in his spiritual nature, a position with which Ellen White taught and mainstream Adventists agree.

=== Original sin ===
According to Anglican Geoffrey Paxton, during the 1960s scholars such as Ford and Edward Heppenstall began to try to highlight a shift in the concept of original sin within the SDA church, away from its foundational belief that Seventh-day Adventists do not believe in original sin.

Seventh-day Adventists have historically preached a doctrine of inherited weakness, but not a doctrine of inherited guilt. Ellen White and others such as George Storrs, and Uriah Smith were disposed to de-emphasise the corrupt nature inherited from Adam, instead stressing the importance of actual, personal sins committed by the individual. Adventists traditionally understand sins of commission as the transgression of God's law, either wilfully or in ignorance. They base their belief on texts such as "Whosoever committeth sin transgresseth also the law: for sin is the transgression of the law." (1 John 3:4) Progressive Adventists add to this with some form of original sin.

=== Robert Brinsmead and debate ===
Ford in turning Brinsmead from his belief in sinless perfection, urged Brinsmead to study the Reformers. As a result, Brinsmead ultimately rejected perfectionism. Around 1970, there was a major controversy amongst Australian Adventists over whether "righteousness by faith" included both justification and sanctification. This had been sparked by Brinsmead, and Ford became caught up in it. Tensions over Ford and the theology teaching at Avondale more generally, led to a meeting of Australian church leaders on 3–4 February 1976 to hear accusations by a group of "Concerned Brethren". Ford's understanding of righteousness by faith was the main issue, while the report mentions "the Sanctuary, the Age of the Earth and Inspiration." In April a group of church leaders and theologians, including Ford met in Palmdale, California, to discuss the meaning of righteousness by faith. Ford was the "center of attention". The resulting document was titled the "Palmdale Statement".

=== Move to United States ===
In response to criticisms of his theology, in 1977 the church moved him to the United States, where he taught religion at Pacific Union College for three years. The classes he taught included the life and teachings of Christ, the Pauline epistles, Christian apologetics, Daniel and Revelation, the major and minor prophets of the Old Testament, introduction to theology, and biblical theology.

=== Increasing tensions with church leadership ===
In October 1979 Ford was invited to address a chapter meeting of the Association of Adventist Forums (now Adventist Forums) held at the college, on the topic of Hebrews 9 and its implications for the Adventist investigative judgment teaching. The talk was titled, "The Investigative Judgment: Theological Milestone or Historical Necessity?" The talk criticised aspects of the traditional understanding and Ford instead suggested an "apotelesmatic" understanding, arguing that Ellen White had such an understanding. Already a controversial figure, Ford's talk appeared to many to be an attack upon fundamental church beliefs. Ford was summoned to the General Conference headquarters in Washington, D.C. He was given six months to write up his views. Late in 1979, he stopped lecturing and moved to Takoma Park, Maryland to research and produce the 991-page manuscript, Daniel 8:14, the Day of Atonement, and the Investigative Judgment. While Ford was in basic agreement with the position of the Adventist Church and the majority of Christendom on the atonement, which declares Christ's "sacrifice in behalf of man was full and complete" and "On the cross the penalty for human sin was fully paid" and with other Adventists as seeing Christ's work in the heavenly sanctuary as the application of the benefits of His already completed work on the cross, Ford directly challenged traditional Adventist views of how to interpret prophecy and how to view the fulfillment of the Day of Atonement by Christ in a way that appeared to completely undermine the denomination's historical reason for existence. Nevertheless, Ford insisted at the start of his manuscript "The present writer has as his intent the defense of the church."

=== Expulsion from teaching and ministry ===
In August 1980, a group of Adventist theologians and administrators convened at Glacier View Ranch in Colorado to examine Ford's views. According to Time magazine, he "made the case that White's 'sanctuary' explication of 1844 no longer stood up, and that 'investigative judgment' undercut the belief in salvation by God's grace apart from good works." The culmination of this event was Ford losing his employment with the denomination as a minister and theology professor. After counsel from the General Conference, the Australasian Division withdrew "Ford's ministerial credentials".

Ford's mentor, Edward Heppenstall, saw him as moving in some theological areas that his mentor could not agree with. Heppenstall was disappointed when he failed to dissuade Ford from his position at Glacier View, subsequently writing to him that he "was shocked at how far" he "had swung to the left Biblically and doctrinally".

To commemorate the 30th anniversary of Glacier View, the Sydney Adventist Forum held a pretend courtroom trial to assess the accuracy of Ford's claim that the Consensus Document has been largely in agreement with him. They concluded, "Ford was found to be substantially correct in claiming that the 114-member Sanctuary Review Committee (SRC) Consensus Document was in agreement with his twelve propositions—while Ministry was judged to have considerably over-stated its case." It concluded, "In retrospect, it is clear that the SRC made—in five days—more progress in understanding this biblical doctrine than the church has typically made in any fifty years of its history."

== Reaction to dismissal ==
In 1980, following Ford's dismissal from the Adventist ministry and professorship, a group of Pacific Union College students along with others at Andrews University founded a sympathetic unofficial journal, entitled Evangelica, in 1980. A group of professors at the college also expressed their displeasure with the General Conference and its then president, Neal C. Wilson, by writing parodies of certain Adventist hymns, an event which became notorious in conservative Adventist circles as the "singing incident". All participants in the unofficial journal Evangelica were fired.

After being dismissed from the ministry, Desmond Ford chose to remain a member of the Seventh-day Adventist church. He founded an interdenominational Christian ministry named Good News Unlimited, which gave him a platform to continue preaching. In 2000, he retired and moved back to Australia from America; in retirement, he continued his association with both Good News Unlimited and the Seventh-day Adventist Church.

== Personal life ==
Ford married Gwen Booth, with whom he had three children – Elènne Gwen Ford (born 29 October 1955), Paul Wesley Ford (born 20 December 1957), and Luke Carey Ford (born 28 May 1966). Gwen died of breast cancer in April 1970. Ford married Gillian ("Gill") Wastell in November of that year.

Desmond Ford died on 11 March 2019 in Sunshine Coast, Queensland.

== Publications ==
Ford has written around 30 books and numerous articles.

- Unlocking God's Treasury, 1964
- Discovering God's Treasures, 1972. Same book as Unlocking God's Treasury.
- Answers on the Way: Scriptural Answers to Your Questions, (Mountain View, CA: Pacific Press Publishing Association, 1976)
- Daniel, (Nashville, TN: Southern Publishing Association, 1978) Anvil Biblical Studies series. ISBN 978-0-8127-0174-6. Scholarly commentary on Daniel with foreword by F. F. Bruce.
- The Abomination of Desolation in Biblical Eschatology (published version of second doctoral dissertation), (Washington, DC: University Press of America, 1979) ISBN 978-0-8191-0757-2.
- Daniel 8:14, The Day of Atonement, and the Investigative Judgment, (Casselberry, FL: Euangelion Press, 1980) ISBN 978-1-883619-08-4. Also known as the "Glacier View Manuscript".
- Physicians of the Soul, God's Prophets Through the Ages, (Nashville, TN: Southern Publishing Association, 1980) ISBN 0-8127-0262-X. Includes Ford's views on Ellen G. White as a prophetess. It also traces Ford's childhood encounters with Adventists and the influence of Ellen G. White's books on helping him find Christ and becoming an Adventist.
- The Forgotten Day, 1981, about the seventh-day Sabbath
- Crisis, 2 vols., 1982. A commentary on Revelation.
- The Adventist Crisis of Spiritual Identity, 1982
- Coping Successfully with Stress, 1984
- Will there be a Nuclear World Holocaust? 1984
- How to Survive Personal Tragedy, 1984
- A Kaleidoscope of Diamonds: The Jewelled Glories of the Cross Revealed, 2 vols, 1986
- Worth More Than a Million, 1987
- Daniel and the Coming King, 1996
- Right With God Right Now: How God Saves People as Shown in the Bible's Book of Romans, 1998
- The End of Terrorism, 2004
- Eating Right for Type 2 Diabetes, 2004
- God's Odds, 2006
- For the Sake of the Gospel: Throw Out the Bathwater, But Keep the Baby, 2008
- Jesus Only, 2008
- The Time is at Hand, 2009
- The Coming Worldwide Calvary, 2009
- The Final Roller-Coaster, 2010
- How Long, O Lord, 2010
- Jesus Only (abridged), 2013. Abridged by Ritchie Way.
- For more publications see Hook, p. 394, 395

Also:

- Inside Story (written by Gillian Ford)
- Why Believe? Source Book
