= Seventh-day Adventist interfaith relations =

Relationship between SDA and other denominations

This article describes the relationship between the Seventh-day Adventist Church and other Christian denominations and movements, and other religions. Adventists resist the movement that advocates their full ecumenical integration into other churches because they believe such a transition would force them to renounce their foundational beliefs and endanger the distinctiveness of their religious message. According to one church document,

"The ecumenical movement as an agency of cooperation has acceptable aspects; as an agency for the organic unity of churches, it is much more suspect."

== History ==
Adventists have often been skeptical of other faiths. The Millerite movement, which gave birth to Seventh-day Adventism, was rejected and treated with hostility by the majority of the North American Christian churches which existed at that time. The early Adventists were treated with hostility because they had unique views about the Sabbath. They consequently came to see themselves as an obedient remnant which was encountering the wrath of the dragon, as it was prophesied in Revelation 12:17. Subsequent developments in Adventist eschatology saw the Sunday-keeping churches identified with Babylon the Great (Revelation 17–18). A central aspect of the Adventist mission was to call people out of Babylon, and into the remnant church, as signified by the second of the three angels' messages.

The Review and Herald (now Adventist Review) October 12, 1876 contains an "amazing" article on cordiality between the Adventist pioneers and the Seventh Day Baptists. James White pointed out that the two bodies agreed on the two great tests of the Christian life, i.e. the divine law and redemption from its transgression through the Son. The main difference between them, White observed, was the question of immortality. Even though differences existed between the two groups, White recommended, "that there be no controversy between the two bodies." He continued, "we further recommend that Seventh-day Adventists in their aggressive [sic] work avoid laboring to build up Seventh-day Adventist churches where Seventh-day Baptist churches are already established..." He said it is much better to seek union with Seventh Day Baptists on the points they agree than to sacrifice that union by urging on them peculiar Adventist sentiments.

While the Adventist church matured and institutionalized itself in the 20th century, opposition from other churches also declined. By the 1950s, Adventists and American conservative Christians were ready to begin a dialogue. A series of discussions between Adventist and conservative leaders led to greater understanding and acceptance on both sides. Even after these milestone events, however, Adventists continued to resist full ecumenical cooperation with other churches, because they believed that such cooperation would endanger the distinctiveness of their religious message.

Bert Beach was the main Adventist who was involved in interreligious dialogue.

On January 22, 2007, church leaders voted to rename the Council on Inter-church/Inter-faith Relations the Council on Inter-church/Inter-religion Affairs. This involved more than a change of name, representing a desire for increased dialogue with other religions.

== Religious liberty ==
"Seventh-day Adventists believe that freedom of religion is a basic human right." For over 100 years, the Adventist church has actively advocated freedom of religion for all people, regardless of faith. In 1893, its leaders founded the International Religious Liberty Association, which is universal and non-sectarian. The Seventh-day Adventist Church State Council serves to protect religious groups from legislation which may affect their religious practices.

The church publishes the magazine Liberty.

== Theological conferences ==
The church has two professional organizations for Adventist theologians who are affiliated with the denomination. The Adventist Society for Religious Studies (ASRS) was formed to foster community among Adventist theologians who attend the Society of Biblical Literature (SBL) and the American Academy of Religion. In 2006 ASRS voted to continue their meetings in the future in conjunction with SBL. During the 1980s the Adventist Theological Society was formed by Jack Blanco to provide a forum for more conservative theologians to meet and is held in conjunction with the Evangelical Theological Society.

== Adventists and ecumenism ==
The Adventist church generally opposes the ecumenical movement, but it supports some of the goals of ecumenism. The General Conference has released an official statement concerning the Adventist position with respect to the ecumenical movement, which contains the following paragraph:

"Should Adventists cooperate ecumenically? Adventists should cooperate insofar as the authentic gospel is proclaimed and crying human needs are being met. The Seventh-day Adventist Church wants no entangling memberships and refuses any compromising relationships that might tend to water down her distinct witness. However, Adventists wish to be "conscientious cooperators." The ecumenical movement as an agency of cooperation has acceptable aspects; as an agency for organic unity of churches, it is much more suspect."

"The New Testament presents a qualified church unity in truth, characterized by holiness, joy, faithfulness, and obedience (see John 17:6, 13, 17, 19, 23, 26). "Ecumenthusiasts" (to coin a word) seem to take for granted the eventual organic unity and communion of the great majority of the churches. They emphasize the "scandal of division," as if this were really the unpardonable sin. Heresy and apostasy are largely ignored. However, the New Testament shows the threat of anti-Christian penetration within "the temple of God" (2 Thess. 2:3, 4). The eschatological picture of God's church prior to the Second Coming is not one of a megachurch gathering all humankind together, but of a "remnant" of Christendom, those keeping the commandments of God and having the faith of Jesus (see Rev. 12:17)." :

"Adventists see the Bible as the infallible revelation of God's will, the authoritative revealer of doctrinal truth, and the trustworthy record of the mighty acts of God in salvation history (see Beliefs of Seventh-day Adventists: 1. The Holy Scriptures). Adventists see the Bible as a unity. For many WCC leaders the Bible is not normative and authoritative in itself. The emphasis is on Biblical diversity, including at times demythologization of the Gospels. For a large number of ecumenists, as is the case for liberal Christianity in general, inspiration lies not in the Biblical text but in the experience of the reader. Propositional revelation is out; experience is in." :

While it is not a member of the World Council of Churches, the Adventist church has participated in its assemblies in an observer capacity.

Three Adventist leaders (John Graz, John Kakembo and Bill Johnsson) attended the Global Christian Forum of 250 Christian leaders from more than 70 nations, held in Limuru (near Nairobi), Kenya in 2007.

== Interfaith dialogue ==
=== Relationship with Roman Catholicism ===
The official beliefs of the church (28 Fundamentals) do not mention the Papacy or Roman Catholicism. An official statement "How Seventh-day Adventists View Roman Catholicism" was released in 1997. Adventists are concerned about the institution of the papacy and the Roman Catholic Church, yet recognize many sincere individual Catholics.

Woodrow Whidden wrote, "we must forthrightly affirm that many positive things have taken place in Roman Catholicism". According to him, the papacy "is a mixed bag morally and ethically... All human organizations (including our own 'enfeebled and defective' denomination) are sadly sinful." He concludes, "the Roman Catholic religious system" or "papal Rome is still the great power envisioned in Daniel 7 and 8; 2 Thessalonians 2; and Revelation 13." See the companion article By Grace Alone? by Clifford Goldstein.

More moderate scholars... Progressive Adventists typically reject these traditional identifications. See Spectrum 27, issue 3 (Summer 1999): 30–52. A number of meetings were held between Seventh day Adventist and Catholic theologians, including Bishop (now Cardinal) Walter Kasper and Msgr John Radano. A short report was released by Ángel Manuel Rodríguez.

Adventist Samuele Bacchiocchi was the first non-Catholic to have graduated from the Pontifical Gregorian University.

See also Reinder Bruinsma, Seventh-day Adventist Attitudes Toward Roman Catholicism 1844–1965 (Berrien Springs, Michigan: Andrews University Press, 1994) ISBN 1-883925-04-5, and another article.

=== Relationship with the Lutheran World Federation ===
There was constructive theological dialogue between the Seventh-day Adventist Church and The Lutheran World Federation. Conversations started in 1994 and ended in 1998. The main issues discussed and described by the final report published in 2000 included Justification by Faith, Scripture and Authority in the Church and Eschatology.

Final report concluded that "Lutherans in their national and regional church contexts" should recognize the Seventh-day-Adventist Church no longer "as a sect but as a free church and a Christian world communion".

=== Relationship with the World Alliance of Reformed Churches ===
There is active theological dialogue between the Seventh-day Adventist Church and the World Alliance of Reformed Churches. In 2001 report on dialogue has been published as well, among other statements it declared that:

"We are happy to conclude that our conversation has been productive in a number of directions. We have affirmed the common doctrinal ground on which we stand, and we have specified some of the ways in which our teachings have developed over time. We have sought to dispel mutual misunderstandings concerning doctrine. We have eschewed the sectarian spirit, and have not questioned one another's status as Christians."

There were also informal meetings between Setri Nyomi, general secretary of the World Alliance of Reformed Churches and Adventist leaders, Nyomi told them that he has experienced the positive witness of the Adventist Church.

=== Relationship with the World Evangelical Alliance ===
The first meeting with the World Evangelical Alliance (WEA) was in 2006. "Although we come from different religious traditions, there was much that we shared in common and was useful to both parties" said Angel Rodriguez. "The meetings were designed to gain a clearer understanding of the theological positions of each body; clarify matters of misunderstanding; discuss frankly areas of agreement and disagreement on a Biblical basis; and explore possible areas of cooperation. The group also enjoyed a visit to several sites in Prague related to Protestant reformer Jan Hus."

Representatives from the WEA and the Adventist church met at Andrews University from August 5–10, 2007. While the Adventist participants agreed with the WEA Statement of Faith and the discussions were described as warm and cordial, there was disagreement over certain distinctive Adventist beliefs (see: Seventh-day Adventist theology). The "Joint Statement..." was released in September.

Clark Pinnock believes that Adventists are evangelicals.

=== Relationship with the French Protestant Federation (FPF) ===
Seventh-day Adventist church is a member of French Protestant Federation, now representing over 900,000 French Protestants and consisting of 17 churches.

"Now we can enjoy the same rights as traditional Protestant churches and we are considered theologically equal with other religious movements in our country," said Jean-Paul Barquon, secretary of the Seventh-day Adventist Church in France.

=== Relationship with the Presbyterian Church (U.S.A.) ===
There was a meeting between delegates from Seventh day Adventist Church and Presbyterian Church (U.S.A.) at the Presbyterian Church's national headquarters in Louisville, Kentucky August 22 to 24 (2007) to affirm common beliefs and dispel stereotypes.

“The Adventist church has a responsibility to clear up misconceptions other Christian denominations might have of us, and meetings such as this one give us an opportunity to do so,” said Ángel Manuel Rodríguez, director of the Biblical Research Institute.

=== Relationship with the Salvation Army ===
There is active dialogue and friendly relation between Salvation Army and Seventh day Adventist Church. Theologians from both denominations met several times .

"It was most important to see the very similar approaches to the Gospel message that we have; very compatible lifestyles and Christ-centeredness in The Salvation Army and the Seventh-day Adventist Church," Dr. Beach told ANN. "Adventists have always had considerable respect for the work of Salvationists, and I hope that in the future we would increase our knowledge of each other and our cooperation in meeting many of humanity's crying spiritual and material needs."

=== Relationship with the Serbian Orthodox Church ===
In 2003 there was meeting in Belgrade between Jan Paulsen (president of the Seventh-day Adventist world church), Patriarch Pavle and Stanislav Hočevar, Roman Catholic archbishop of Belgrade.

"Mutual respect must continue between the Adventist Church and the Orthodox Church in Serbia in order to protect religious liberty, Paulsen said. The conversation between the two leaders was informal, amicable and cordial, and covered brief exchanges on world affairs and also the Adventist position on health.

Paulsen also visited Stanislav Hocevar, Roman Catholic archbishop of Belgrade. The prelate's numerous questions about the faith and theology of the Seventh-day Adventist Church gave Paulsen an in-depth opportunity to explain the church's understanding of Bible teachings."

=== Relationship with the World Council of Churches ===
While not being a member church of the World Council of Churches, the Adventist Church has participated in its assemblies in an observer capacity.

World Council of Churches see Seventh-day Adventist Church as "a denomination of conservative evangelical Christians"Seventh-day Adventist Church | World Council of Churches.

=== Relationship with the Willow Creek Association ===
The Willow Creek Association is an international, evangelical Christian association which runs workshops and holds conferences, including a large annual conference. According to one article, "Seventh-day Adventist pastors and church members have been attending these conferences for years".

=== Relationship with other groups and individuals ===
Adventist theology is distinctly Protestant, and it has much in common with Evangelicalism in particular. However, in common with many restorationist groups, Adventists have traditionally taught the belief that the majority of Protestant churches have failed to "complete" the Reformation by overturning the errors of Roman Catholicism (see also Great Apostasy) and "restoring" the beliefs and practices of the primitive church—including Sabbath-keeping, adult baptism and conditional immortality. The Adventist church is thus classified as a Restorationist sect by some religion scholars. On the same basis it may be associated with the Anabaptists and other movements of the Radical Reformation.

Prominent Adventist evangelist George Vandeman affirmed other churches in What I Like About... The Lutherans, The Baptists, The Methodists, The Charismatics, The Catholics, Our Jewish Friends, The Adventists.

Adventists typically do not associate themselves with Fundamentalist Christianity:

"Theologically, Seventh-day Adventists have a number of beliefs in common with Fundamentalists, but for various reasons have never been identified with the movement... On their part, Adventists reject as unbiblical a number of teachings held by many (though not all) Fundamentalists..."

However one stream of Adventist thought–Historic Adventism–is often considered fundamentalist.

Baptist scholar Clark Pinnock gave very favourable reviews of Alden Thompson's Inspiration, and Richard Rice's theology textbook Reign of God. Pinnock was earlier impressed by Richard Rice's book The Openness of God, and later was the editor for another work of the same name, contributed by authors Rice, John E. Sanders and others. Ray Roennfeldt wrote his PhD on Pinnock's view of biblical inspiration. Pinnock also wrote the foreword to Immortality or Resurrection? by Samuele Bacchiocchi.

Baptist Wayne Grudem wrote the foreword to Samuele Bacchiocchi's book Women in the Church.

At an Adventist conference, Methodist scholar Donald Dayton described himself as a "sympathetic outsider". He affirmed Adventists for being ahead of their time on certain beliefs, although not necessarily entirely correct.

Anglican minister Geoffrey Paxton had significant interaction with Adventists, particularly with Robert Brinsmead. He lost his job as principal of the Queensland Bible Institute (now Crossway College) because of his association with Adventists.

Defrocked Adventist minister Desmond Ford has presented sermons to a wide variety of Christian denominations.

Evangelical Tony Campolo has written about his positive experiences speaking on numerous Adventist university campuses in the forward to Adventism for a New Generation by Steve Daily. He presented at the first International Conference on Adventists in the Community, in 2004.

Evangelical author Philip Yancey gave a presentation at Avondale College Church on October 20, 2001, which was broadcast throughout the South Pacific Division. He returned to speak again at Avondale College in 2007.

Historian Martin E. Marty describes Adventism as trans-modern, as opposed to counter-modern fundamentalists.

== Relationship with other religions ==
This section describes the interaction between the Adventist church and other religions beside Christianity.

The General Conference body Global Mission started in 1990 after a decision was made at the General Conference Session. The [Office of] Adventist Mission was formed in 2005, as a merger of Global Mission and the Office of Mission Awareness.

Global Mission has centers specializing in the study of Buddhism, Hinduism, Judaism, secularism/postmodernism and Islam.

Long before that, the church had acquired one house, in 1949: the first Hebrew Adventist congregation in the world. Then, some members from church go through a form of "separation" from the organization, or "sect" (note: this church is considered to be the same religion as Judaism, only with the difference of the Christian Messiah, according to some, in the Jerusalem Post).

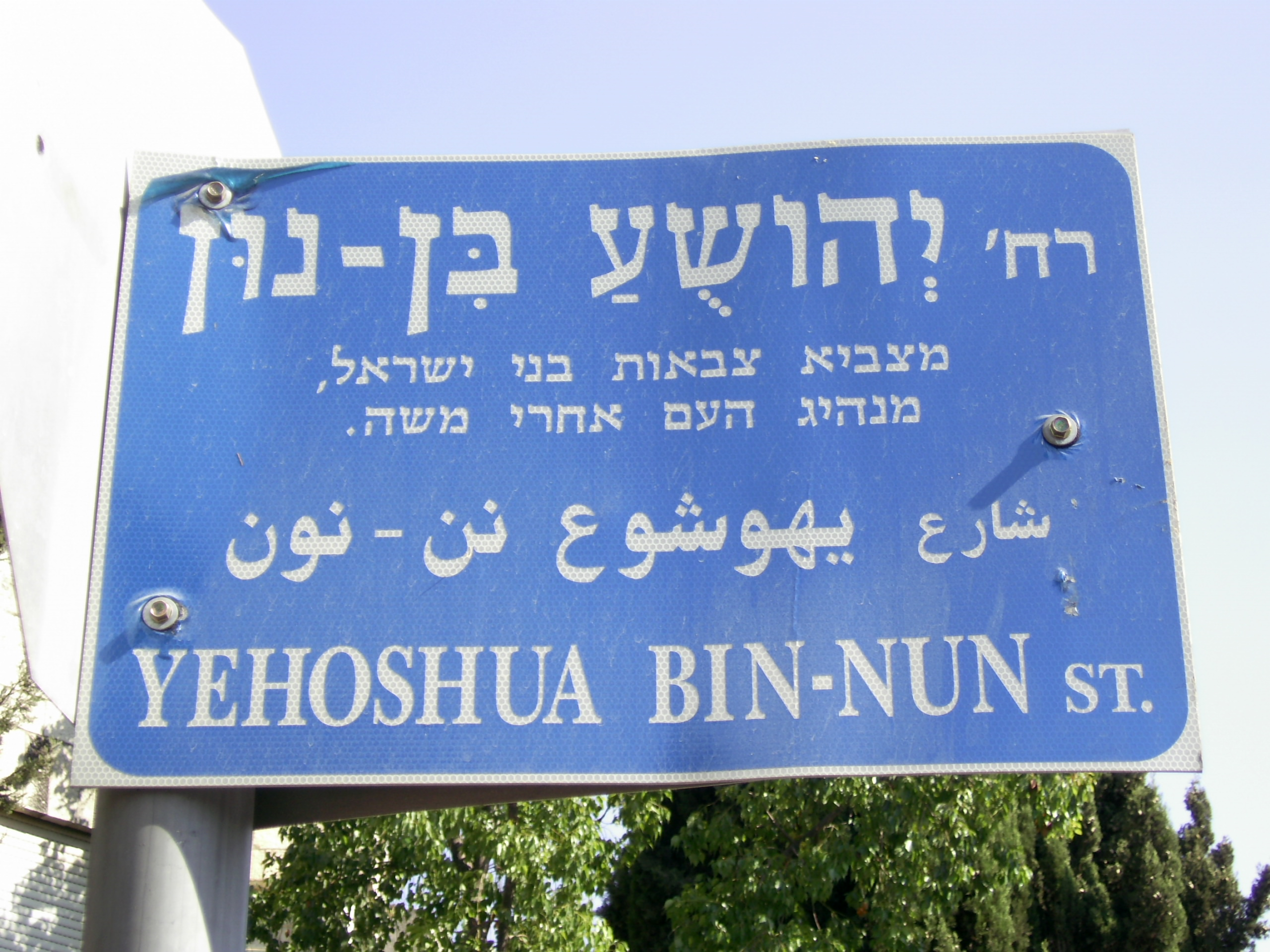
Jerusalem – Street Sign – "יְהושֻעַ" (Joshua)

They adhere to the official emblem, but without the cross, among other characteristics, with emphasis on presentations without mentioning the "Trinity," following the historical teachings of the church. And see also about James White: "[...] Trinity which does away the personality of God, and his Son [...]" (1855). The "Part of a series on Adventism" also shows regarding non-following of the Trinity ("[...] the very first manifested act of YHWH was the creation of his son Yehoshua [...]" etc.; furthermore, these same believers demonstrate this:" '[...] God was manifest in the flesh, [...]' 1Ti 3:16."; and they explain the Adventist view on this). At this point it is necessary to say that one name was being confirmed by the president of UPASD and by the SALT rector, now WJAFC director, they having remained as witnesses of Yehoshua/Yehôšûa‘, focusing on Hebrew/Yehoshua's witnesses; this is in addition to what was seen with Andrews University, including "יְהוֹשֻׁ֧עַ"/"Y'hoshua", and Jehoshua with SDA, including "Yehoshua‘" too (this even agrees with Hebrew manuscript, about "יְהוֹשֻׁ֨עַ", and with indication of the old pronunciation "Yahōshû", by Anchor Bible Series, when speaking of the word Jesus; Talshir shows: "יהושוע", "yəhōšuʿ", among others; observed in cuneiform: "ia-ḫu-ú-šu-ú = Yāḫû-šūˁ"/"𒄿𒀀 𒄷 𒌑 𒋗 𒌑" – and one publication from The Times of Israel shows on Notes, by writer of an etymological dictionary of Biblical Hebrew: "71 – Joshua (יהושע – Y’HoShu\a)[...]. From: Ya [...] + HoShu\a (הושוע) [...]"). This is the Seventh-day Adventist Messianic synagogue – later named "בית בני ציון"/"Beth B’nei Tsion" (BBT) and others names (see also: Adventist food factory has certification from rabbis from the american Orthodox Union – in addition to the well-known acceptance of Messianic synagogues by a Reform Jewish wing).

=== Relationship with Islam ===
See "New Directions in Adventist—Muslim Relations", a Spectrum interview with Global Center for Adventist-Muslim Relations director Jerald Whitehouse. See also.

Samir Selmanovic, the pastor of Church of the Advent Hope in New York City, was honored by the group Muslims Against Terrorism for his assistance following the September 11, 2001 attacks, including holding a Christian-Muslim discussion at the peak of tensions.

== Relationship with non-religious organizations ==
As of 2009, the Adventist church was exploring the possibility of forming a partnership with the World Health Organization (WHO). According to one report, "While the WHO has previously partnered with other faith-based organisations, this would be the first time it could extend its official relations to a church denomination."

== Publications ==
Ministry magazine is sent to over twice as many non-Adventists as Adventists.

Shabbat Shalom calls itself "The Journal of Jewish-Christian Reconciliation".

== See also ==
- Ecumenism
- Seventh-day Adventist theology
- Seventh-day Adventist Church
- History of the Seventh-day Adventist Church
- Questions on Doctrine
- Biblical Research Institute
