= Gerhard Hasel =

American theologian

Dr. Gerhard Hasel

Personal details
- Born: Gerhard Franz Hasel; July 27, 1935 Vienna, Austria
- Died: August 11, 1994 (aged 59) Ogden, Utah, US
- Spouse: Hilde (Schafer) Hasel
- Children: 3
- Occupation: Theologian
- Education: Andrews University; Vanderbilt University

Gerhard Franz Hasel (July 27, 1935 – August 11, 1994) was a Seventh-day Adventist theologian, and Professor of Old Testament and Biblical Theology as well as Dean of the Seventh-day Adventist Theological Seminary at Andrews University.

== Biography ==
Hasel was born on July 27, 1935 in Vienna, Austria, and emigrated to the United States in 1958. He received his bachelor of arts degree in theology and German from Atlantic Union College in 1959. He earned a master of arts in systemic theology in 1960 from Andrews University, and in 1962, he received his master of divinity degree from Andrews. In 1964, he was naturalized as a U.S. citizen. In 1970, he received his PhD in Biblical Studies from Vanderbilt University. In 1977, he was a guest speaker at Newbold College of Higher Education in Binfield, England. He served as an assistant professor of religion at Southern Missionary College from 1963 to 1964, and was a pastor with the Southern New England Conference of Seventh-Day Adventists. Hasel was a member of the Society of Biblical Literature, American Academy of Religion, American Schools of Oriental Research, Chicago Society of Biblical Research, International Organization for the Study of the Old Testament and Michigan Academy of Science, Arts and Letters. He also served as president of the Adventist Theological Society from 1990-1992.

Hasel's childhood experiences with his father in Nazi Germany are recounted in the book A Thousand Shall Fall, written by his younger sister, Susi Hasel Mundy. He married Hilde Schafer, who also survived the war. Gerhard and Hilde had 3 children: Michael, Melissa, and Marlena. Hasel died in a car accident in Utah in 1994.

== Theology and research interests ==
Hasel had a research interest in the theme of the remnant. He wrote the "Remnant" article for the International Standard Bible Encyclopedia. His book on the subject is one of just four references listed in the Anchor Bible Dictionary article on the remnant. Hasel also had an interest in both biblical archaeology and biblical theology. Hasel argued that "the Biblical theologian draws his categories, themes, motifs, and concepts from the Biblical text itself," as compared to the systematic theologian who "endeavors to use current philosophies as the basis for his primary categories or themes."

Hasel was also known for his conservative views. Hasel espoused a "high view" of inspiration and was opposed to the use of the "purely" historical-critical method of Biblical scholarship. Hasel took over the Old Testament Department and taught the first course at the SDA Theological Seminary in hermeneutics, in which he opposed most critical methods and supported an "historical-literal" interpretation of Genesis as a literal seven-day week.

== Works ==
He authored Old Testament Theology: Basic Issues in the Current Debate and New Testament Theology: Basic Issues in the Current Debate where he suggests there are ten different methodologies at use in the history of Old Testament Theology. He also wrote a commentary on the book of Amos published by Baker Book House, and authored Understanding the Book of Amos ISBN 0-8010-4353-0.

He wrote several non-scholarly books, published by Seventh-day Adventist church publishing houses, on the biblical theology of the Remnant.

== See also ==
- Seventh-day Adventist eschatology
- History of the Seventh-day Adventist Church
- 28 Fundamental Beliefs
- Questions on Doctrine
- Biblical Research Institute
- Prophecy in the Seventh-day Adventist Church
- Investigative judgment
- The Pillars of Adventism
- Second Coming
- Conditional Immortality
- Historicism
- Three Angels' Messages
- Sabbath in Seventh-day Adventism
- Ellen G. White
- Seventh-day Adventist Church Pioneers
- Last Generation Theology

Preceded by Jack Blanco	President of the Adventist Theological Society; 1990–1992	Succeeded by C. Raymond Holmes
