= Jon Paulien =

Seventh-day Adventist theologian

Personal details
- Born: Jonathan K. Paulien; 1949 (age 76–77) New York City, NY
- Occupation: Professor, writer Seventh-day Adventist theologian
- Education: Atlantic Union College; Andrews University

Jonathan K. Paulien (born 1949) is a Seventh-day Adventist theologian.

== Biography ==
Paulien has a BA from Atlantic Union College, and an M.Div. and Ph.D. from Andrews University. His doctoral thesis, Decoding Revelation’s Trumpets: Literary Allusions and Interpretation of Revelation 8:7–12 was completed in 1987. Prior to his Ph.D., he worked as a Seventh-day Adventist church pastor for several years in New York City.

He was professor of New Testament Interpretation at the Seventh-day Adventist Theological Seminary at Andrews University. He spent over two decades at Andrews. In 2007, he became dean of the Faculty of Religion at Loma Linda University, a position he held until 2019.

He and his wife Pamella have three children.

== Theology ==
Paulien stated he has found material on the "stages of faith" to be "the most life-changing material I have ever learned or shared."

== Publications ==
Paulien writes primarily for a Seventh-day Adventist audience. The majority of his books and articles have been published by non-academic publishing houses and magazines owned by the Seventh-day Adventist church. His scholarly articles also have been largely published by Seventh-day Adventist journals.

=== Non-Academic Books ===
- 2008. Armageddon at the Door: An Insider's Guide to the Book of Revelation
- 2008. Everlasting Gospel, Ever-Changing World
- 2004. The Deep Things of God: An Insider's Guide to the Book of Revelation
- 2003. John: The Beloved Gospel
- 2002. The Day That Changed the World: Seeking God After September 11
- 2001. Everyday Faith: How to Have an Authentic Relationship With God in the Real World
- 1999. The Millennium Bug: Is This the End of the World As We Know It
- 1995. John: Jesus Gives Life to a New Generation (The Abundant life Bible amplifier) with George R. Knight
- 1994. End Time (full title (As speculation builds, let's keep our eyes focused on) What the Bible says about the end-time)
- 1993. Present Truth in the Real World: The Adventist Struggle to Keep and Share Faith in a Secular Society

=== Articles ===
- "The End of Historicism? Reflections on the Adventist Approach to Biblical Apocalyptic" - "part 1". Archived from the original on 26 November 2010. Journal of the Adventist Theological Society 14:2 (Fall 2003), p15–43; "part 2". Archived from the original on 26 November 2010. JATS 17:1 (Spring 2006), p180–208
- ""Revisiting the Sabbath in the Book of Revelation". Archived from the original on 18 March 2007.". Journal of the Adventist Theological Society 9:1–2 (1998), p179–186
- "Armageddon" entry in Anchor Bible Dictionary I:394-5

== See also ==
- Seventh-day Adventist Church
- Seventh-day Adventist theology
- Seventh-day Adventist eschatology
- History of the Seventh-day Adventist Church
- 28 Fundamental Beliefs
- Questions on Doctrine
- Teachings of Ellen G. White
- Inspiration of Ellen G. White
- Prophecy in the Seventh-day Adventist Church
- Investigative judgment
- Pillars of Adventism
- Second Coming
- Conditional Immortality
- Historicism
- Three Angels' Messages
- Sabbath in seventh-day churches
- Ellen G. White
- Adventism
- Seventh-day Adventist Church Pioneers
- Seventh-day Adventist worship
- Ellen G. White Estate
- Loma Linda University

| Preceded by Ivan Blazen | President of the Adventist Society for Religious Studies; 2004 | Succeeded by Jean Sheldon |
