= Samuele Bacchiocchi =

Seventh-day Adventist minister and author

- Born: 29 January 1938; Rome, Italy
- Died: 20 December 2008 (aged 70)
- Education: Pontifical Gregorian University
- Alma mater: Newbold College
- Occupations: Author and theologian
- Spouse: Anna
- Children: 3
- Writing career
- Subject: Sabbath in Christianity
- Notable work: From Sabbath to Sunday
- Notable awards: Pope's Gold Medal
- Literary movement: Seventh-day Adventist

Samuele R. Bacchiocchi (29 January 1938 – 20 December 2008) was a Seventh-day Adventist author and theologian, best known for his work on the Sabbath in Christianity, particularly in the historical work From Sabbath to Sunday, based on his doctoral thesis from the Pontifical Gregorian University. Bacchiocchi defended the validity of the Feasts of the Lord, situated in Leviticus 23, he wrote two books on the subject. He was also known within the Seventh-day Adventist church for his opposition to rock and contemporary Christian music, jewelry, the celebration of Christmas and Easter, certain dress standards and alcohol.

== Biography ==
Bacchiocchi was born in Rome, Italy on 29 January 1938.

He later earned a Bachelor of Arts degree in theology from Newbold College in England, which was followed by a Master of Arts and Bachelor of Divinity at Andrews University in Michigan, United States; finishing in 1964. Bacchiocchi moved with his wife Anna to Kuyera, Shashamene, Ethiopia, where he lectured in Bible and history at Ethiopian Adventist College.

In 1969 they returned to Rome where Bacchiocchi studied at the Pontifical Gregorian University. He was the first non-Catholic to be admitted since its establishment in the 16th century. He completed a Doctoratus in Church History in 1974 on the subject of the decline of Sabbath observance in the Early Christian church, based on his research in the Vatican libraries.

Bacchiocchi taught in the religion department of Andrews University from 1974 till his retirement in 2000. He taught theology and church history. He regularly presented seminars worldwide, and wrote many self-published books and articles on biblical topics. He was married to Anna Gandin Bacchiocchi. They had three children.

In May 2007, Bacchiocchi announced that he had developed liver and colon cancer. He ultimately succumbed to 4th stage liver cancer, shortly after midnight, Saturday 20 December 2008, the day before what would have been his 47th wedding anniversary. He was with his three children and his wife.

== Impact ==
In 1977 Bacchiocchi published From Sabbath to Sunday, documenting the historical transition from the Saturday Sabbath to Sunday in the early Christian church due to social, pagan and political factors, and also the decline of standards for the day. The book made an impact on the wider academic community outside Adventism, as well as within Adventism. Prior to his work, Seventh-day Adventists had focused on the role played by either the Pope, or by Roman Emperor Constantine I in the transition from Sabbath to Sunday, with Constantine's law declaring Sunday as a day of rest for those not involved in farming work. Subsequent to Bacchiocchi's work, Adventists have emphasized that the shift from Sabbath to Sunday was a more gradual process.

Bacchiocchi has also been influential in the Worldwide Church of God (and its offshoots), which supported Sabbath-keeping until 1995, and also other Sabbath keeping groups.

== Beliefs ==
Bacchiocchi supported the conservative lifestyle habits of Seventh-day Adventists, such as a vegetarian diet; abstinence from alcohol, coffee, and tea; and avoidance of rock music in church worship services.

In one newsletter he submitted an hypothesis, expanding upon the Adventist (and historical Protestant) teaching that the antichrist is the papacy, to also include Islam, which he reported "generated a lot of hate mail".

== Controversy over academic awards ==
There was some controversy in the 2000s over Bacchiocchi's claim to have received the awards summa cum laude (Latin for "with highest honors"), the Pope's gold medal, and an official Roman Catholic imprimatur (Latin for "let it be printed") for his doctorate at the Pontifical Gregorian University. An official letter claimed Bacchiocchi did not receive these awards. By 2007, both parties agreed he had received a summa cum laude and the Pope's gold medal, for the Licentia [a phase of the doctoral program]; and only a magna cum laude for the Doctoratus itself. Bacchiocchi defended his actions by claiming the difference between the Licentia and the Doctoratus is small and would not be understood by most English speakers.

== Allegations of Jesuit Influence ==
Bacchiocchi was the target of speculation that he was a covert Jesuit infiltrating the Adventist Church on behalf of the Vatican.

On Bacchiocchi's website BiblicalPerspectives.com, he responds to Five Major Allegations:

- Being a Jesuit Spy
- Rejecting the Adventist interpretation of the Number 666 as Pope's title Vicarius Filii Dei
- Believing that EG White had human limitations and there were inaccuracies in the Great Controversy
- Questioning the legitimacy of the dates (538 to 1798) in the 1260 year prophecy
- Promoting the ceremonial observance of Old Testament Festivals

In an interview by Adventist Historian, James Arrabito, an allegation was made by Alberto Rivera (who claimed to himself have been a Jesuit which has been disputed by Catholic sources) that Bacchiocchi's book From Sabbath to Sunday was given as a ploy to win over Adventists.

In 2009 a book was released by AB Publishing written by Adventist evangelist Danny Vierra titled The Final Inquisition, Vierra questions what the impact of five years of doctoral studies at a Papal University founded by Ignatius of Loyola had on his theology.

== Publications ==
Bacchiocchi owned a small non-academic publishing house called Biblical Perspectives, through which he self-published 16 books of his own, and also a book by Graeme Bradford. He was the primary author of the Endtime Issues email newsletter.

Sabbath:

- From Sabbath to Sunday: A Historical Investigation of the Rise of Sunday Observance in Early Christianity (4 of 11 chapters online)
- Divine Rest for Human Restlessness: A Theological Study of the Good News of the Sabbath for Today (4 of 8 chapters online)
- The Sabbath in the New Testament: Answers to Questions (4 of 13 chapters online)
- The Sabbath Under Crossfire: A Biblical analysis of Recent Sabbath/Sunday Developments (4 chapters, plus chapter 7; of 7)

Other:

- Immortality or Resurrection? A Biblical Study on Human Nature and Destiny
- The Advent Hope for Human Hopelessness. A Theological Study of the Meaning of the Second Advent for Today
- Wine in the Bible: A Biblical Study on the Use of Alcoholic Beverages
- The Christian & Rock Music: A Study on Biblical Principles of Music
- Women in the Church: A Biblical Study on the Role of Women in the Church
- Christian Dress and Adornment
- The Passion of Christ: In Scripture and History
- The Marriage Covenant: A Biblical Study on Marriage, Divorce, and Remarriage
- Hal Lindsey’s Prophetic Jigsaw Puzzle: Five Predictions that Failed!
- God’s Festivals in Scripture and History. Volume I: The Spring Festivals
- God’s Festivals in Scripture and History. Volume 2: The Fall Festivals
- The Time of the Crucifixion and the Resurrection
- Popular Beliefs, Are They Biblical?

Other authors:

- Biblical Perspectives also published More Than A Prophet by Graeme Bradford, which is fully and freely available online at SDAnet

== See also ==
- Seventh-day Adventist Church
- Ellen G. White
- Adventism
- Adventist Health Studies
- Seventh-day Adventist eschatology
- Seventh-day Adventist theology
- Seventh-day Adventist worship
- Sabbath in seventh-day churches
- Sabbath in Christianity
- History of the Seventh-day Adventist Church
- 28 Fundamental Beliefs
- Questions on Doctrine
- Biblical Research Institute
- Teachings of Ellen G. White
- Inspiration of Ellen G. White
- Prophecy in the Seventh-day Adventist Church
- Investigative judgment
- The Pillars of Adventism
- Second Coming
- Conditional Immortality
- Historicism
- Three Angels' Messages
- Sabbath in seventh-day churches
- Inspiration of Ellen White
- Ellen G. White
