= Dwight Nelson =

Seventh-Day Adventist evangelist

Dwight K. Nelson is a Seventh-day Adventist evangelist and author.

He was the senior pastor of Pioneer Memorial Church on the campus of Andrews University from 1983 until June 1, 2023. Before coming to Andrews University he served as a pastor in Oregon for ten years. He was the preacher for the Adventist satellite evangelistic series The NeXt Millennium Seminar in 1998. In 2004 he, along with former BBC News presenter Gillian Joseph presented a discussion-style series called Evidence: Through My Experience held at Newbold College, Berkshire. Later that same year he hosted another discussion series at Newbold College called Mind The Gap. He hosted the television program The Evidence Nelson serves as adjunct teacher of homiletics at the Seventh-day Adventist Theological Seminary at Andrews. He is the currently the speaker for a weekly television program, New Perceptions.

== Background and family ==
Born in Tokyo, Japan, of missionary parents, Nelson can converse in Japanese. He attended the now-defunct Far Eastern Academy in Singapore and graduated from Southern Missionary College (now Southern Adventist University), Collegedale, Tennessee, where he received a bachelor's degree in 1973. He attended Andrews University where he received a master of divinity (M.Div.) degree in 1976 and a doctor of ministry (D.Min.) degree in 1986 from the Seventh-day Adventist Theological Seminary. His books include Outrageous Grace, Countdown to the Showdown and Built to Last. In 1994, the Pioneer Memorial Church hosted ABC Television's National Christmas Eve service.

Nelson is married to Karen Oswald Nelson. They have two children.

== Net 98 ==
Nelson was the speaker for the Adventist church's Net '98 evangelistic series. It was broadcast live October 9 to November 14, 1998, from Pioneer Memorial Church on the campus of Andrews University. It was broadcast in 38 languages and reached people in more than 100 countries at 7,600 sites, 2000 of which were in North America. He began preparing for the series nearly two years in advance. On opening night officials estimated that attendance around the world totalled 161,000 people. While Nelson preached upstairs in the main sanctuary of the church, downstairs in 38 cubicles, translators repeated his message in the various languages broadcast live around the world.

Adventists usually present last day events and the prophecies of Daniel and Revelation in their evangelistic campaigns. Nelson says he intentionally chose to shift the focus from the apocalyptic to the relational because so many people lead lives of broken relationships. He chose the theme "Finding a forever friendship with God."

== Books ==
Nelson writes predominantly for a Seventh-day Adventist church member audience and publishes with non-academic, Seventh-day Adventist church owned publishing houses.

- Pursuing the Passion of Jesus: How "Loving the Least" Helps You Fulfill God's Purpose for Your Life, Pacific Press, 2005
- The Eleventh Commandment: A Fresh Look at Loving Your Neighbor As Yourself, Pacific Press, 2001
- Outrageous Grace: Finding a Forever Friendship With God, Pacific Press, 1998
- Built to Last: Creation and Evolution : A Thoughtful Look at the Evidence That a Master Designer Created Our Planet, Pacific Press, 1998
- The Claim: Nine Radical Claims of Jesus That Can Revolutionize Your Life, Pacific Press, 1996
- "The Jesus Generation: Shaping Up for the Showdown," Hart Research Center, 1993
- "Countdown to the Showdown," Hart Research Center, 1992

== See also ==
- Seventh-day Adventist Church
- Seventh-day Adventist theology
- Seventh-day Adventist eschatology
- History of the Seventh-day Adventist Church
- Teachings of Ellen G. White
- Inspiration of Ellen G. White
- Prophecy in the Seventh-day Adventist Church
- Pillars of Adventism
- Second Coming
- Conditional Immortality
- Historicism
- Three Angels' Messages
- Sabbath in seventh-day churches
- Ellen G. White
- Adventism
- Seventh-day Adventist worship
- Andrews University
