= Remnant (Seventh-day Adventist belief) =

End time remnant of believers who are faithful to God

In Seventh-day Adventist theology, there will be an end time remnant of believers who are faithful to God. The remnant church is a visible, historical, organized body characterized by obedience to the commandments of God and the possession of a unique end-time gospel proclamation. Adventists have traditionally equated this "remnant church" with the Seventh-day Adventist denomination.

A distinct but related concept is the eschatological remnant, which will manifest shortly prior to the second coming of Jesus. The "remnant church" is understood to act as a catalyst for the formation of this group. The eschatological remnant will consist of some (but not all) constituents of the present "remnant church", together with a cohort of believers from other (that is, non-Adventist) churches. Only members of the eschatological remnant will be saved through the end-times.

Traditionally, Adventists have also applied the symbol of "Laodicea" to themselves, a self-criticism as being "lukewarm" in the faith (Revelation 3:15–16).

The Adventist doctrine of the end-time remnant is based primarily upon Revelation 12:17, which states:

And the dragon was wroth with the woman, and went to make war with the remnant of her seed, which keep the commandments of God, and have the testimony of Jesus Christ. (King James Version, emphasis added)

An estimated 90% of Adventists believe "The Adventist Church has a special mission to proclaim God’s last message to the world", according to estimates of local church leaders in a 2002 worldwide survey.

== Official statements ==
The doctrine of the remnant is outlined in the 28 fundamental beliefs of the Adventist church, as follows.

13. Remnant and Its Mission:
The universal church is composed of all who truly believe in Christ, but in the last days, a time of widespread apostasy, a remnant has been called out to keep the commandments of God and the faith of Jesus. This remnant announces the arrival of the judgment hour, proclaims salvation through Christ, and heralds the approach of His second advent. This proclamation is symbolized by the three angels of Revelation 14; it coincides with the work of judgment in heaven and results in a work of repentance and reform on earth. Every believer is called to have a personal part in this worldwide witness. (Dan. 7:9-14; Isa. 1:9; 11:11; Jer. 23:3; Mic. 2:12; 2 Cor. 5:10; 1 Peter 1:16-19; 4:17; 2 Peter 3:10-14; Jude 3, 14; Rev. 12:17; 14:6-12; 18:1-4.)

"18. The Gift of Prophecy: One of the gifts of the Holy Spirit is prophecy. This gift is an identifying mark of the remnant church and was manifested in the ministry of Ellen. G. White[...] (Joel 2:28, 29; Acts 2:14–21; Heb. 1:1–3; Rev. 12:17; 19:10.)

=== Mission statement ===
The Mission Statement of the church declares:

The mission of the Seventh-day Adventist Church is to proclaim to all peoples the everlasting gospel of God’s love in the context of the three angels' messages of Revelation 14:6–12, and as revealed in the life, death, resurrection, and Godly ministry of Jesus Christ (Isaiah 9:6,7), leading them to accept Jesus as personal Saviour and Lord and to unite with His remnant church; and to nurture believers as disciples in preparation for His soon return."

=== Church manual and baptismal vow ===
The Seventh-day Adventist Church Manual contains a "summary of doctrinal beliefs" in its appendix that is designed especially for use in the instruction of candidates for baptism. The final point identifies the Adventist church with the "remnant":

28. In accordance with God’s uniform dealing with mankind, warning them of coming events that will vitally affect their destiny, He has sent forth a proclamation of the approaching return of Christ. This preparatory message is symbolized by the three angels’ messages of Revelation 14, and meets its fulfillment in the great Second Advent Movement today. This has brought forth the remnant, or Seventh-day Adventist Church, keeping the commandments of God and the faith of Jesus.

The church manual also outlines two alternative baptismal vows for candidates who are entering into church membership. The final question of the traditional longer vow (question 13) asks the candidate:

Do you accept and believe that the Seventh-day Adventist Church is the remnant church of Bible prophecy and that people of every nation, race and language are invited and accepted into its fellowship? Do you desire to be a member of this local congregation of the world church?

Following baptism, the new member is presented with a "certificate of baptism and commitment" which contains a similarly worded statement, but expressed as an affirmation rather than a question.

In 2005, an alternative baptismal vow was approved at the General Conference Session. This alternative vow contains three statements of belief, and does not mention the remnant. However, it does still require acceptance of the Fundamental Beliefs. Which version to use is up to the discretion of the parties involved.

== History ==
In 1849, Joseph Bates asserted the Adventists were the remnant.

Gerhard Hasel was a recognized remnant scholar within Christian circles at large, and wrote on the theme of the remnant throughout the Old Testament.

== Traditional position ==
The Seventh-day Adventist Church has traditionally identified itself as the end-time "remnant church" described in Revelation 12:17. Two of the identifying marks of the remnant listed in this verse are that they "keep the commandments of God" and have the "testimony of Jesus". It is held that the "commandments of God" refer to the Ten Commandments, which includes the fourth commandment regarding the seventh-day Sabbath. In addition, Revelation 19:10 equates "the testimony of Jesus" to the "Spirit of prophecy", which Adventists believe is a reference to the ministry and writings of Ellen G. White. The Adventist church therefore sees itself as unique in possessing these two identifying marks of the remnant church.

According to the historicist interpretation of Revelation traditionally employed by Adventists, the remnant church emerges after a period of 1,260 years (Revelation 12:6) during which the Papacy reigns over Christendom. This period ended in 1798. The Seventh-day Adventist Church formed shortly afterwards, in the period 1844–1863.

The remnant church has a divine mission which is symbolised in the three angels' messages. This mission is to proclaim the "everlasting gospel" to humanity, to call true believers out of false religion (represented by Babylon) and to prepare the world for the final end-time crisis. Even so, at the present time, the remnant church is a visible institution that is made up of both saved and unsaved individuals (in other words, membership in the Adventist church is not a guarantee of salvation).

Ellen White wrote,

"Notwithstanding the spiritual darkness, and alienation from God, that exist in the churches which constitute Babylon, the great body of Christ's true followers are still to be found in their communion."

At a time, known technically as the "close of probation", shortly before the second coming of Jesus, humanity will be polarized into two distinct groups. Adventists traditionally have taught that this polarization will occur over the Sabbath commandment. Those who are obedient to God in this final era will make up the "eschatological remnant" which will be saved through the final crisis. The eschatological remnant will have some continuity with the remnant church, in that there will be some Adventists who remain faithful in the crisis. However, it is understood that numerous Adventists will succumb to apostasy, thus departing from the remnant. At the same time, there will be numerous Christian believers from non-Adventist churches who will join the eschatological remnant and receive salvation.

== Alternative interpretations ==
Adventist scholar Ángel Manuel Rodríguez, who himself supports the traditional Adventist interpretation, has stated: "it is with great concern that some observe a tendency to de-emphasize or ignore this fundamental self-definition". Rodríguez identifies a number of different interpretations of the "remnant" that have gained popularity within contemporary Adventism. He proposes several reasons for the increasing redefinition of the concept, including increased contact with other Christians, the delay of the Parousia, theological education in non-Adventist universities, exposure to post-modern world views, and perceived apostasy in the Adventist church.

Similarly, in 2008, Roy Adams wrote in the Adventist Review, "Today we hesitate to claim we’re the remnant".

In The Shaking of Adventism, Anglican Geoffrey Paxton described the mainstream belief as follows:

[The Seventh-day Adventist] believes that God has called him to carry forward the message of the Reformation in such a way as no other Christian or Christian body is able to do. In his opinion the Seventh-day Adventist is God's special heir of the Reformers. Only through the Adventist Church can the work of the Reformation be carried to its God-designed end.

=== Wider remnant/remnant message ===
In modern times some Adventists have broadened the "remnant" concept to include sincere Christians in other denominations. Such a broadening occurred as early as the publication of Questions on Doctrine.

Many Adventists who hold a "wider" concept of the remnant nevertheless consider that the Adventist church has a unique place in God's purpose for the end times. Questions on Doctrine acknowledged the Adventist church as "the visible organization through which God is proclaiming this last special message to the world". Adventists such as Ross Cole speak of Adventists as possessing the "remnant message". These views focus more on the message of the remnant, and not on the Adventist church as an institution.

According to Ron Corson, many "progressive" Adventists believe in "An inclusion of other Christians into the category termed the 'Remnant.'"

=== Liberal views ===
Some Adventists have re-interpreted the remnant concept significantly. Steve Daily rejects the identification of the "remnant" with any institution or denomination, and instead considers it to be an invisible entity. He argues for a "move from an ethnocentric remnant theology to a spirit of religious affirmation which acknowledges that the 'kingdom of God on earth' transcends every religious movement of mankind". Ángel Manuel Rodríguez criticizes Daily's position, claiming that "The level of discontinuity with traditional Adventism is so drastic that it is difficult to incorporate it into any meaningful dialogue."

Others have interpreted the remnant concept along sociological and political lines, for example Remnant and Republic: Adventist Themes for Personal and Social Ethics, edited by Charles W. Teel Jr. It is argued that the remnant has a duty to work towards social and political reform. Some who espouse these views deny that the remnant is a religious body to be identified with any particular church. Rodriguez again rejects such interpretations, asserting that they set aside "the biblical understanding of the remnant as fundamentally a religious entity".

== Criticism of the remnant doctrine ==
=== Progressive Adventist criticism ===
The progressive Adventist journals Spectrum and Adventist Today commonly publish articles and letters which deny this doctrine, instead claiming that the remnant is much wider than the Adventist church. Rodríguez believes that a tendency to reject the remnant concept is related to a tendency to reject the historicist method of interpreting prophecy.

Raymond Cottrell, writing about the challenges of producing the Seventh-day Adventist Bible Commentary, claimed that the remnant doctrine is not supported by the traditional prooftexts.

What should an editor do with 'proof texts' that inherently do not prove what is traditionally attributed to them—as, for example...Revelation 12:17 and 19:10... In most of these and a number of other passages, pastoral concern led us to conclude that the Commentary was not the place to make an issue of the Bible versus the traditional interpretation, much as this disappointed us as Bible scholars and would be a disappointment to our scholarly friends who know better."

Nathan Brown, then Record editor, has written in that magazine, "For many Adventists, the topic of the 'remnant'—and particularly various statements that have sounded like claims to be "the remnant church"—has been a source of discomfort, feeling a bit too much like arrogance or at best claims we would all struggle to live up to."

=== Non-Adventist criticism ===
Non-Adventists scholars have disputed the Adventist understanding of the remnant. Calvinist theologian Anthony Hoekema argued that the doctrine of the remnant church is indefensible on both exegetical and theological grounds. Exegetically, the Greek word "remnant" (leimma) is not found in Revelation 12:17 and thus it is not possible to read a "church within a church" into the verse. The translation "remnant" is an inaccuracy of the KJV upon which the doctrine was originally based. Theologically, Adventists insist that the remnant is merely a visible body within the wider "invisible church;" however there is no biblical or theological warrant for believing in the existence of an ecclesiola in ecclesia, or "little church within the church". The concept of "remnant" in the New Testament, according to Hoekema, applies only to Jewish believers. Hoekema alleges that the Adventist concept of the remnant resembles the error of schismatic movements such as Montanism, Novatianism and Donatism.

Hoekema finally concludes that the "remnant church" concept places Adventism among the cults, since it implies that the Adventist church is "the last true church left on earth, and all other groups which claim to be churches are not true but false churches." That is, it implies the existence of an "exclusive community", which Hoekema believes is a distinctive trait of the cults. However, because Adventists acknowledge that it is possible for non-Adventist Christians to be saved, Hoekema concedes they manifest the "cultist trait" in a "somewhat ambivalent manner" when compared to religions who teach that salvation cannot be found outside their organisations.

== Remnant concept in breakaway groups from Adventism ==
The Seventh Day Adventist Reform Movement, which schismed from the Seventh-day Adventist Church in the 1920s, sees itself as the "remnant", the Adventist church represented by the "seed", and other Protestants as the "woman" in Revelation 12:17.

== See also ==
- History of the Seventh-day Adventist Church
- Criticism of the Seventh-day Adventist Church#Remnant church status
- Prophecy in the Seventh-day Adventist Church
- Millerites
- The Pillars of Adventism
- Seventh-day Adventist interfaith relations
- Three Angels' Messages
- Teachings of Ellen G. White
