= Present Truth =

"Present Truth" may refer to any of the following:

In the Seventh-day Adventist Church:

- Present truth, a belief in truth as 'appropriate and vital' to any given time
- The Present Truth, the original title of the Adventist Review, the official church newsmagazine, begun by Seventh-day Adventist Pioneer James Springer White.
- Present Truth Magazine, started by former Adventist Robert Brinsmead
- Present Truth in the Real World, a book by Adventist theologian Jon Paulien

In other Adventist groups:

- The Present Truth, or Meat in Due Season, a booklet by Jonas Wendell
- The Present Truth, a quarterly publication by the Laymen's Home Missionary Movement
