= Seventh-day Adventist eschatology =

Religious belief

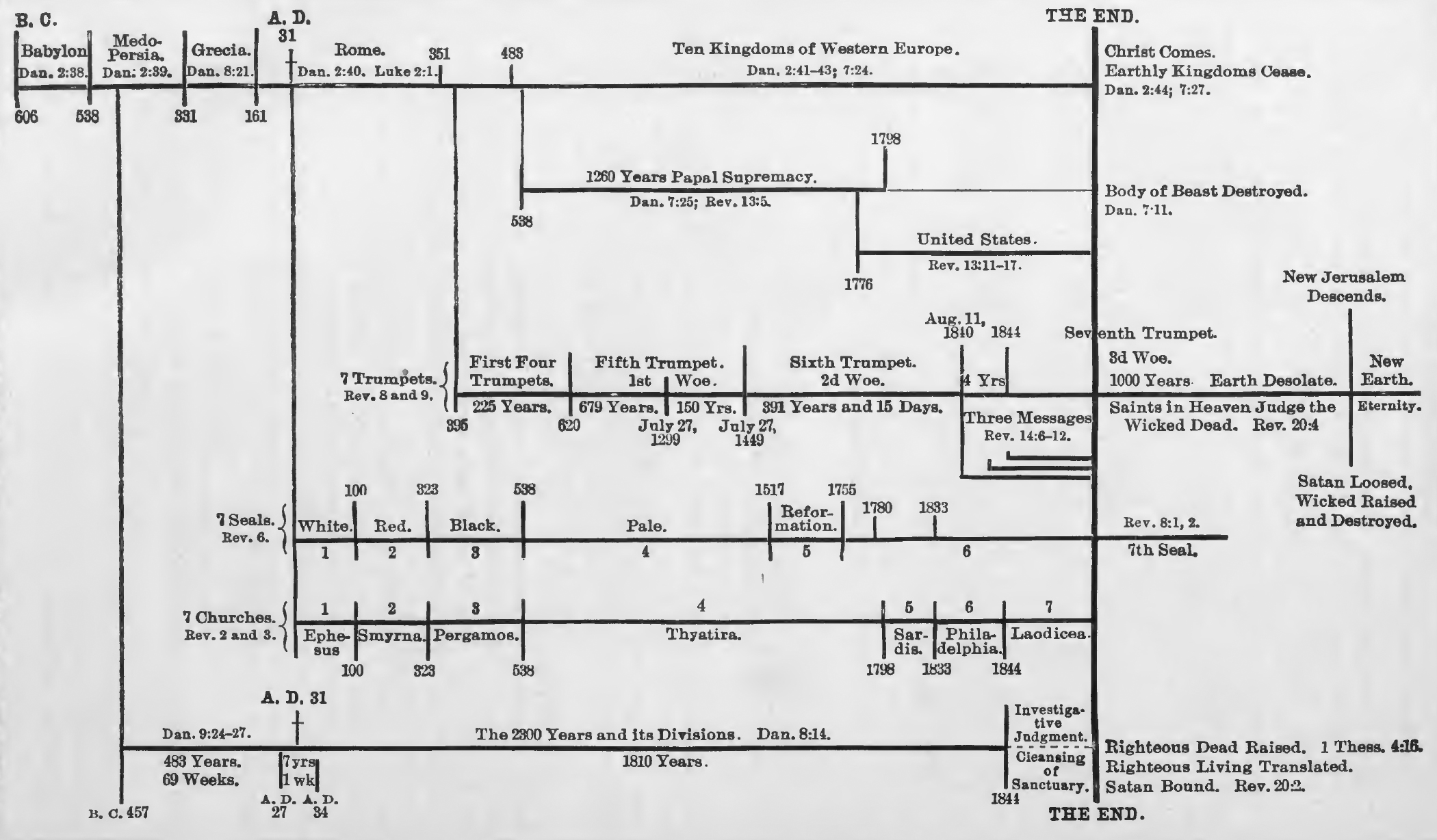
Diagram of Adventist eschatology in the book Bible Readings for the Home Circle (1888).

The Seventh-day Adventist Church holds a unique system of eschatological (or end-times) beliefs. Adventist eschatology, which is based on a historicist interpretation of prophecy, is characterised principally by the premillennial Second Coming of Christ. Traditionally, the church has taught that the Second Coming will be preceded by a global crisis with the Sabbath as a central issue. At Jesus' return, the righteous will be taken to heaven for one thousand years. After the millennium the unsaved cease to exist as they will be punished by annihilation while the saved will live on a recreated Earth for eternity.

The foremost sources are the biblical books of Daniel and Revelation. Jesus' statements in Matthew 24 for instance, as well as multiple other Bible verses are also used. The classic Adventist commentary on the end-times was Uriah Smith's Daniel and the Revelation. The writings of Ellen G. White have also been highly influential, particularly the last part of her book The Great Controversy. "Prophecy seminars", developed since the mid-20th century, have been a key popular source.

== Basis ==
=== Fundamental beliefs ===
The eschatological teachings of the Seventh-day Adventist Church are summarized in the final five of the denomination's 28 fundamental beliefs:

24. Christ's Ministry in the Heavenly Sanctuary
25. Second Coming of Christ
26. Death and Resurrection
27. Millennium and the End of Sin
28. New Earth

According to a 1985 survey, 29% of North American Adventist lecturers nominated eschatology as the area of greatest contribution by Adventists to then-current theology. This ranked second only to wholism.

=== Biblical basis and perspectives ===
Seventh-day Adventism derives its eschatological teachings in large part from its interpretation of the apocalyptic Bible books of Daniel and Revelation, as well as Jesus' end-times sermon found in Matthew 24, Mark 13, and Luke 21. Mainstream Adventism interprets biblical prophecies using the historicist method, which utilises the day-year principle; some of the prophecies of Revelation are yet to be fulfilled.

A 2004 official statement remarks: Adventists' "sense of identity and calling grows from an understanding of Bible prophecies, especially those concerning the time immediately preceding the return of Jesus."

=== Hermeneutics ===
Adventists believe the Christian church is the historical continuation of the Old Testament Israel as God's people, centered around Jesus, and that Old Testament end-time prophecies about Israel will be fulfilled more broadly. (This stands in contrast to dispensationalism, a popular conservative Christian view, which sees a prominent place for the nation of Israel in the end-times). Adventist hermeneutics categorically rejects preterism, futurism and idealism as proper hermeneutical systems of interpretation of Bible prophecy.

=== Ellen White and SDA pioneers ===
The writings of Ellen G. White have been highly influential in the formation of Seventh-day Adventist eschatology, particularly the final chapters of her book The Great Controversy.

The classic interpretation was Uriah Smith's book, known by its abbreviated title as Daniel and the Revelation. It was affirmed by Ellen White, "and had an unrivaled influence on [Adventist] prophetic teaching." It was based on his earlier works Thoughts, Critical and Practical, on the Book of Revelation (1867), and Thoughts, Critical and Practical, on the Book of Daniel (1873). The book was revised several times during Smith's life and afterwards. The Seventh-day Adventist Encyclopedia states, "Although a creative writer, he also borrowed from contemporary and early expositors for his materials, especially in his interpretations of prophecy."

== Historicist interpretation of prophecy ==
=== Prophecies of Daniel ===
Adventists teach that Historicism (including the day-year principle) is the correct viewpoint in interpretation, as well as the traditional belief of the almost all Protestant Reformers. Historicism as a method of interpreting prophecy has been challenged by some interpreters.

==== Image of Daniel 2 ====
The background to Adventist eschatology is found in the book of Daniel, which has strong thematic and literary links to Revelation. A key passage is the interpretation of king Nebuchadnezzar's vision of a statue in Daniel 2. The sequence of world kingdoms is interpreted by Adventists as representing in turn Babylonia, Medo-Persia, Greece, and Rome (pagan Rome and later papal Rome). The feet of iron and clay in the vision are understood to represent the nations of Europe subsequent to the breakup of the Roman empire. The Seventh-day Adventists follow the Historicist interpretation of the statue.

Chapter	Parallel sequence of prophetic elements as understood by SDA Historicists					
	Past				Present	Future
Daniel 2	Head; Gold (Babylon)	Chest & 2 arms Silver (Media-Persia)	Belly and thighs Bronze (Greece)	2 Legs; Iron (Pagan Rome & Papal Rome)	Feet & Toes; Clay & Iron (Present Global Power)	Rock; God's unending kingdom left to no other people

This interpretation is not unique to Adventists and was held by multiple expositors in the 18th and 19th centuries.

Since iron and clay are materials that cannot form a durable structure, Adventist scholars interpret this as the multiple short-lived attempts throughout European history to form an empire such as the Holy Roman Empire, Napoleonic France, Nazi Germany, The European Union.

==== Chapter 7 – The 4 beasts and Judgement ====
Paraphrase of the prophecy of Daniel 7 by arranging prophecy phrases parallel to given interpretation.

Survey of prophecy

This survey section consists of paraphrases and quotations of the significant texts. During the reign of Belshazzar, the last king of Babylon, Daniel experiences a dream or vision. It has been fifty years since the vision of chapter 2.

==== Comparison of Daniel 2, 7 and 8 ====
Chapter	Parallel sequence of prophetic elements as understood by Historicists					
	Past				Present	Future
Daniel 2	Head; Gold (Babylon)	Chest & 2 arms Silver	Belly and thighs Bronze	2 Legs; Iron	2 Feet with toes Clay & Iron	Rock; God's unending kingdom left to no other people
Daniel 7	Winged Lion	Lopsided Bear	4 Headed / 4 Winged; Leopard	Iron toothed beast w/Little Horn	Judgment scene Beast slain	A son of man comes in clouds Given everlasting dominion He gives it to the saints.
Daniel 8		2-horned Ram (Media-Persia)	Uni- / 4-horned Goat; 4 Winds (Greece)	Little Horn; A Master of Intrigue	Cleansing of Sanctuary; Leads to:	(Kingdom of God)

== Eschatological events ==
In traditional mainstream Adventist teaching, the end times consists of four distinct episodes:

- The Investigative Judgment, beginning in 1844 and ending at the close of probation
- The "time of trouble", beginning at the close of probation and ending at the second coming of Jesus
- The millennium
- The destruction of sinners and new earth

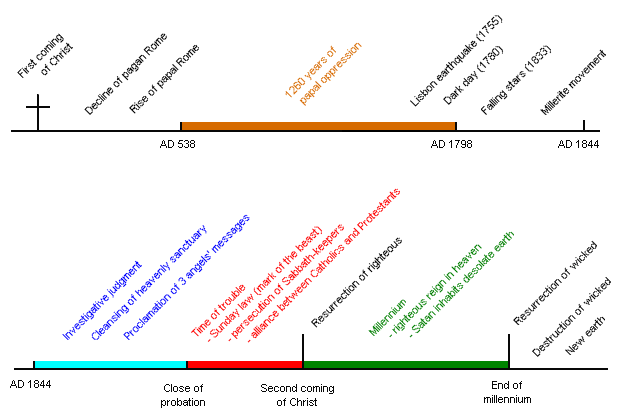
Timeline of eschatological events in traditional Seventh-day Adventist teaching.

=== Events prior to 1844 ===
The Roman Empire was a world power active during the ministry of Jesus. Adventists believe the destruction of Jerusalem in AD 70 was a partial fulfillment of Jesus' end-times discourse in Matthew 24.

The empire continued several centuries into the Christian era, when it was ultimately replaced by the papacy. The papacy is identified with the "man of sin" of 2 Thessalonians, the "Antichrist" of 1 John and the "little horn" of Daniel chapters 7 and 8. It is believed that the Roman Catholic religion grew into a corruption of original, authentic Christianity. Among other things, it is considered to have changed the church's day of worship from Saturday to Sunday.

The "1,260 days", "42 months" or "time, times and dividing of time" of apocalyptic prophecy are equated, and are interpreted as 1260 years, based on the day-year principle. This has traditionally been held to be the period AD 538 to 1798, as the era of papal supremacy and oppression as prophesied in Revelation 12:6, 14–16. This period began with the defeat of the Ostrogoths by the Roman General Belisarius. In Adventist belief, this was the last of three Germanic tribes (including also the Heruli and the Vandals) to be defeated by Rome (see Daniel 7:20, Daniel 7:24 and other passages). The period ended with the successes of Napoleon of France; specifically, the capture of Pope Pius VI by General Louis Alexandre Berthier in 1798, which was a blow to the papacy. This capture of the pope by the French army was understood as the "deadly wound" of Revelation 13:3. Today a number of Adventist scholars believe the end-points cannot be given precisely, because the history was more of a gradual rise and fall; however the mainstream view does support a period of 1260 years. A minority view by Samuele Bacchiocchi is that the rise to "supremacy" and the "downfall" of the papacy are events spanning a larger time, and cannot be pinned to such points in time.

After the end of the 1260 days, and prior to 1844, several significant events took place. In 1755 a massive earthquake hit Lisbon. On May 19, 1780, northeastern America experienced a day of extraordinary darkness followed by a blood-red moon that night. On November 13, 1833, a spectacular Leonids meteor shower occurred. These three events were thought to be a fulfillment of Revelation 6:12, paving the way for the final events of history.

==== Three Angels' Messages ====
During the 1830s and 1840s the Millerite movement proclaimed the soon return of Jesus. Adventists have traditionally interpreted this as the initial proclamation of the three angels' messages.

=== The Investigative judgment ===
The investigative judgment commenced in 1844 "at the end of the prophetic period of 2300 days". During this time, Jesus Christ is believed to be ministering in the Most Holy Place of the heavenly sanctuary, "blotting out" the sins of all who are found to truly believe in him. Meanwhile, on earth, the remnant church proclaims the "three angels' messages" of Revelation 14; it "announces the arrival of the judgment hour, proclaims salvation through Christ, and heralds the approach of His second advent." As a result, there is "a work of repentance and reform on earth."

The completion of the investigative judgment marks the "close of probation". In Adventist teaching, this is a crucial moment when sinners will no longer be able to repent and be forgiven, because Christ will have ceased his intercessory ministry.

Then Jesus ceases His intercession in the sanctuary above. He lifts His hands and with a loud voice says, "It is done;" and all the angelic host lay off their crowns as He makes the solemn announcement: "He that is unjust, let him be unjust still: and he which is filthy, let him be filthy still: and he that is righteous, let him be righteous still: and he that is holy, let him be holy still." Revelation 22:11. Every case has been decided for life or death."

— Ellen G. White, The Great Controversy

=== The time of trouble ===
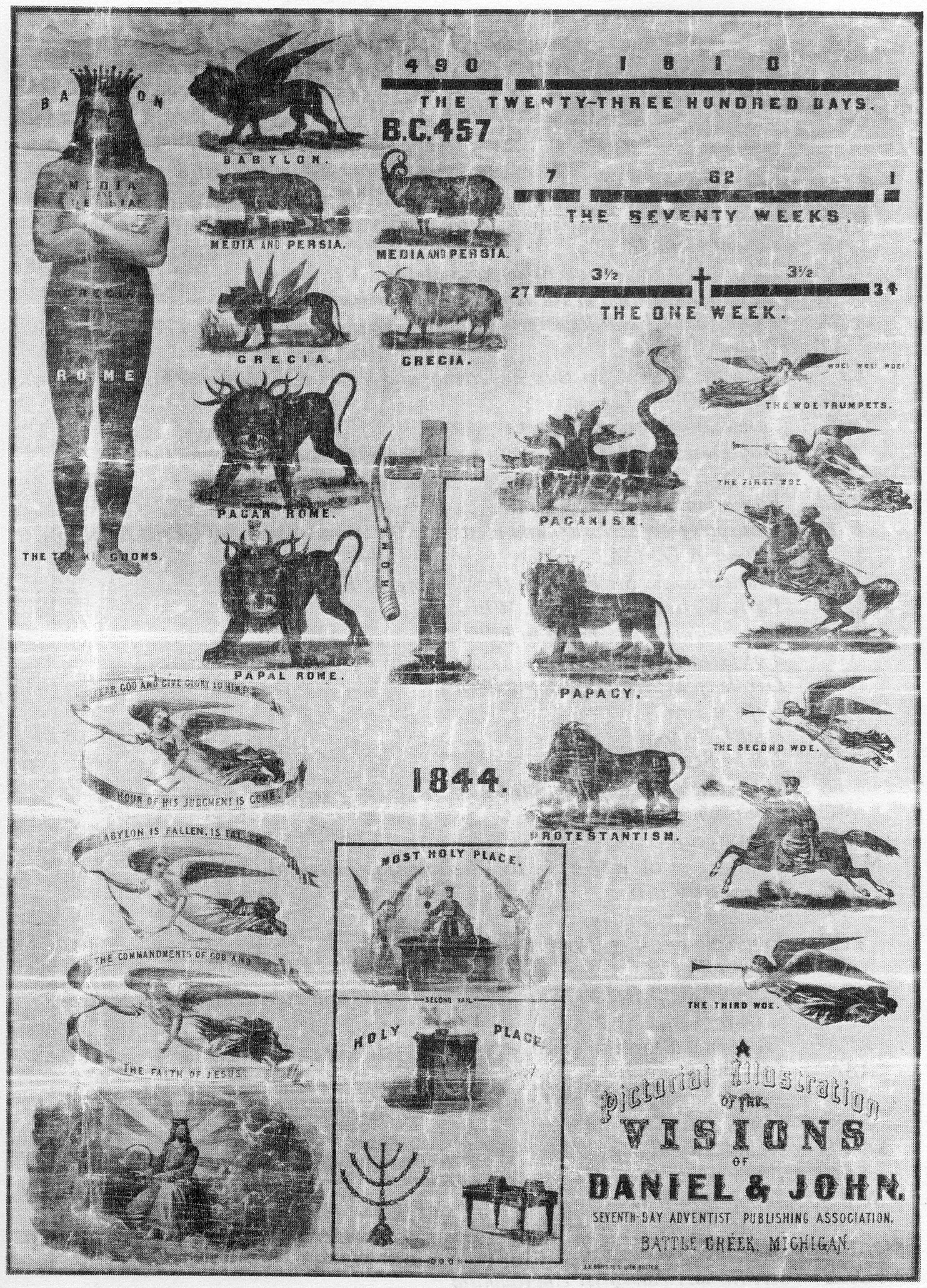
1863 prophetic chart including the beasts of Revelation interpreted as paganism, the papacy and Protestantism

Note: This section describes the traditional view of the church.

Following the close of probation will be a "time of trouble," a brief but intense period of time immediately preceding the Second Coming of Jesus Christ. Adventists believe the Roman Catholic Church will return to prominence during the end times, fulfilling the prophecy of the first beast of Revelation 13 (the leopard-like beast from the sea) whose "deadly wound" (i.e. the deposal of the Pope in 1798) will be healed. The United States of America, meanwhile, will establish ties with the Papacy, in fulfilment of the second beast of Revelation 13 (the lamb-like beast from the earth). Some of the more liberal Adventists do not share these convictions about the Roman Catholic Church, or are more cautious. (J. N. Andrews was the first Adventist to identify America in prophecy, in 1851).

Ultimately, the Protestant churches of America will join the confederation between the beasts, forming the "image to the beast" (Revelation 13:14–15). At this time, a conflict will ensue that will "involve the whole world," and in which "the central issue will be obedience to God's law and the observance of the Sabbath." Religious and civil authorities will combine to enact a "Sunday law" which requires all people to observe Sunday as a sacred day. The "Sunday law" is interpreted as the meaning of the "mark of the beast" described in Revelation 13:16–17.

In contrast to those who choose to obey the "Sunday law," and therefore receive the "mark of the beast," people who observe the seventh-day Sabbath will receive the "Seal of God" (mentioned in Revelation 7:2ff.). Sabbath keepers will experience fierce persecution from world governments, which will include economic coercion and ultimately the death penalty.

As the Sabbath has become the special point of controversy throughout Christendom, and religious and secular authorities have combined to enforce the observance of the Sunday, the persistent refusal of a small minority to yield to the popular demand will make them objects of universal execration. It will be urged that the few who stand in opposition to an institution of the church and a law of the state ought not to be tolerated; that it is better for them to suffer than for whole nations to be thrown into confusion and lawlessness. ... This argument will appear conclusive; and a decree will finally be issued against those who hallow the Sabbath of the fourth commandment, denouncing them as deserving of the severest punishment and giving the people liberty, after a certain time, to put them to death. Romanism in the Old World and apostate Protestantism in the New will pursue a similar course toward those who honor all the divine precepts.

— Ellen G. White, The Great Controversy

Despite being almost overwhelmed by persecution, the people of God will be delivered by the second coming of Jesus Christ, when he returns to earth in glory.

The "time of trouble" has also been known as the "Time of Jacob's Trouble," described as "a brief period of extreme tribulation" just before the Second Coming, and after the close of probation. It is contemporaneous with the seven last plagues. The term comes from Jeremiah 30:7, and is based on the narrative of Jacob's wrestling with God in Genesis 32:22–30, and Jeremiah's description of Israel's captivity in Babylonia prior to the predicted liberation in Jeremiah 30 verses 3, 7–9, 11.

Recent arguments claim an allusion from Revelation 14:7 in the three angels' messages to Exodus 20:11 in the fourth of the Ten Commandments. Thus in the end time, the battle over worship will include the Sabbath.

=== The Second Coming ===
Seventh-day Adventists believe the Second Coming of Jesus will be literal, personal, sudden and universally visible. The second coming coincides with the resurrection and translation of the righteous, as described in 1 Thessalonians 4:16. (See fundamental belief number 25.)

Adventists reject an intermediate state between death and resurrection, and hold that the soul sleeps until the resurrection of the body at Christ's coming. They also reject the doctrine of the pretribulational rapture. The Seventh-day Adventist Church holds neither the traditional view of the premillennial nor any of the postmillennial schools of end-time belief. Both of these schools believe that Christ will literally and physically be on the earth at his second coming. In contrast to this, Adventism teaches that the righteous will rise up and meet Christ in the air at His second coming and are taken with Him to Heaven.

=== The Millennium ===
The Second Coming of Jesus Christ marks the beginning of the Millennium, according to Adventist teaching. At the second coming, the righteous dead will be resurrected (the "first resurrection", Revelation 20:5), and both they and the righteous living will be taken to heaven to reign with Christ for 1000 years. The rest of mankind (the wicked, or unrighteous) will be killed at the second coming, leaving the earth devoid of human life.

During the millennium, Satan and his angels will occupy the desolate earth; this is how Adventists interpret the "binding" of Satan described in chapter 20 of the Book of Revelation. The millennium will be the time when the wicked will be judged. Satan and his angels will be loosed at the end of the millennium when the wicked, or unrighteous are brought back to life to face judgement.

=== The destruction of sinners and new earth ===
At the close of the Millennium, Adventists believe that Christ will again return to earth together with the righteous and the "Holy City" (the New Jerusalem, Revelation 21:10) to implement His judgment on the wicked. He will then raise the wicked (the "second resurrection"), who will surround the New Jerusalem along with Satan. At this point Satan, his angels, and wicked humanity will suffer annihilation in the Lake of Fire ("the second death", Revelation 20:8). Adventists disagree with the traditional doctrine of hell as a place of conscious eternal punishment.

Finally, God will create a new earth where the redeemed will enjoy eternal life free of sin and suffering.

== Additional interpretations ==
Ellen White's book (The Great Controversy) has been a frequent evangelistic handout. While much of it presents Christian and Adventist church history, the later chapters describe end-time events. Her views expressed in the book represent the mainstream opinion in Adventism. Some alternative views about eschatology have been proposed by individuals and groups in the Adventist church.

Critics have written on issues regarding the book The Great Controversy. One critic has stated "There can be little doubt that the Roman church courted much of the antagonism it received." [...] "incredibly arrogant and contemptuous of democratic principles" in the U.S. "The Roman Catholic Church of those days was a contemptuous and contemptible organization, rightly perceived as a threat to the nation and the world." "But those days are over. The world has changed. The United States has changed. And even the Roman Catholic church has changed, in the second half of our century, having reconciled itself with progress, liberalism and modern civilization. It is no longer the Bible-suppressing, science-resisting, liberty-opposing, Protestant-hating, culture-ignoring, Latin-mumbling, obscurantism-loving ecclesiastical organization of former years, intent on ruling the world from Rome. Vatican Council II transformed all that."

However Ellen White stated...

The Roman Church now presents a fair front to the world, covering with apologies her record of horrible cruelties. She has clothed herself in Christlike garments; but she is unchanged. Every principle of the papacy that existed in past ages exists today. The doctrines devised in the darkest ages are still held. Let none deceive themselves. The papacy that Protestants are now so ready to honor is the same that ruled the world in the days of the Reformation, when men of God stood up, at the peril of their lives, to expose her iniquity. She possesses the same pride and arrogant assumption that lorded it over kings and princes, and claimed the prerogatives of God. Her spirit is no less cruel and despotic now than when she crushed out human liberty and slew the saints of the Most High.

— The Great Controversy, Ellen White, p. 571

Opinions vary in regards to this topic.

=== Prophetic interpretation of Revelation ===
Traditionally, Adventists interpret the letters to the seven churches of Asia in Revelation 2 and 3 as fulfilled in consecutive periods of church history.

According to mainstream Adventist thought, prophecies usually have only a single fulfillment. For instance Gerhard Hasel argued apocalyptic prophecy has only "one fulfillment for each symbol." "General" or "classical" prophecy may have dual or multiple fulfillments only if Scripture itself points to this, for instance with the virgin birth (Isaiah 7:14 / Matthew 1:22–23), and the latter rain (Joel 2 / Acts 2). In contrast, a minority have argued for multiple fulfillments of other prophecies. Some Progressive Adventists advocate multiple diverse possible fulfillments of prophecy, and some try to include Antiochus IV Epiphanes, the Seleucid king who conquered Israel, as a preliminary fulfillment. Most Adventists disagree with this.

The themes of Revelation are heavily grounded in the Old Testament, so Adventist scholarship first looks to this background before attempting interpretation. The context and overall literary structure are important for interpretation. For instance Revelation is not always chronological (e.g. Jesus' death in Revelation 12:10,11 cannot follow 11:15 where He reigns; and Babylon's activities in chapter 17 cannot follow its destruction in chapter 16), but multiple visions are parallel, and progressively illuminate themes. In addition to parallels, there are contrasts such as the Lamb and the beast; and the seal of God and the mark of the beast. Revelation shows a typological connection between ancient Israel's history, and church history.

=== Cosmic signs ===
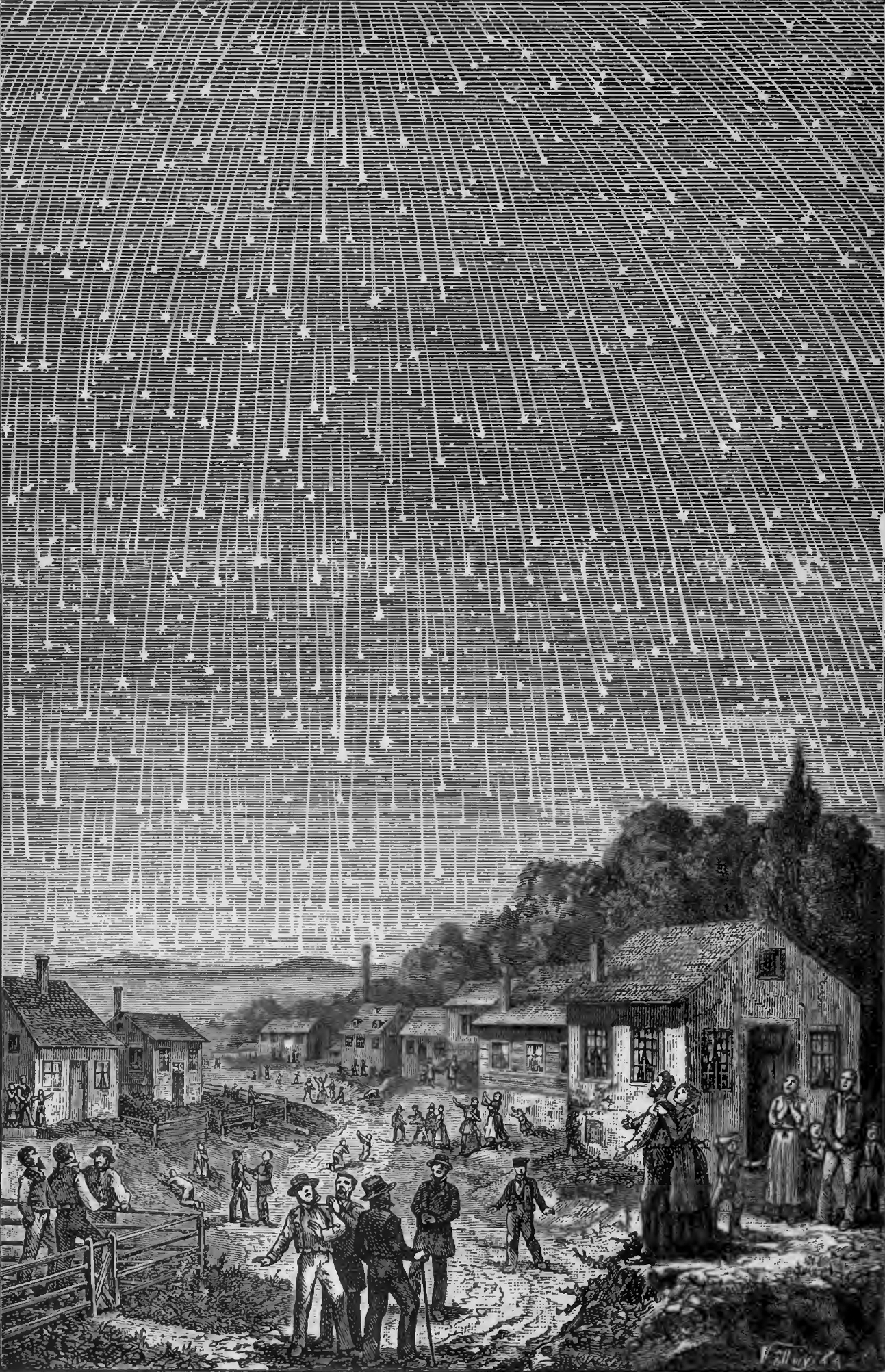
A famous depiction of the 1833 meteor storm, produced in 1889 for the Seventh-day Adventist book Bible Readings for the Home Circle

Great cosmic signs have traditionally been interpreted as the fulfillment of Bible prophecy and signs of the nearing Second Coming, such as the 1755 Lisbon earthquake in Portugal, New England's Dark Day of 1780, and a spectacular meteor shower in 1833. This is based on the sixth seal (Revelation 6:12–17) of the "seven seals", and Jesus' end-times sermon in Matthew 24:29 and Mark 13:24–25 (see also Luke 21). Adventists had argued the Dark Day was a supernatural sign. Critics claim that it occurred from natural causes due to forest fires. The interpretations are still commonly held by Adventist, although some have challenged the interpretations.

Some state there were bigger earthquakes before Lisbon. Still, they remain highly significant events in history. They believe people were led to God, and these are preliminary signs, but not the ultimate cosmic signs bring in the Second Coming.

Many believe their occurrence towards the end of papal supremacy (1798) is significant, and that the order of events matches the biblical prediction. Some believe the context of Jesus' end-times sermon indicates the period stretches from the destruction of Jerusalem (AD 70) to the seven last plagues prior to the Second Coming. Jon Paulien claims they are signs of the age, not signs of the end; they do instruct us to keep watch. The events are the "day of the Lord" foretold in Old Testament prophecy.

=== Spiritualism ===
Ellen White was critical of spiritualism (which she believed to be communication with evil spirits). Multiple Adventists see the spreading social acceptance of the belief in evil spirits and their powers such as in witchcraft, the occult, as evidenced in the prominent films, books, and society along with the spread of Spiritual Formation in modern-day churches, and the acceptance of communicating with spirits in modern-day churches in Montanism style movements which have emerged from the late 19th century as an indication of the fulfillment of the prediction.

=== World empires ===
The traditional teaching is that Rome was the last world empire prophesied in Daniel 2 and 7, which divides up into the nations of Europe. On the other hand, one historian claimed several subsequent empires which have been larger, including the Byzantine, Arab and Ottoman empires.

Adventists predicted that in WWII, Hitler's forces would not conquer Europe, based on Daniel 2:43 which states the toes of the statue [interpreted as the nations of Europe] would not remain united.

==== Ottoman Empire ====
In 1838, Millerite preacher Josiah Litch had predicted the fall of the Ottoman Empire in August 1840, based on Revelation 9. This was regarded as being fulfilled on August 11, 1840, when Turkey responded to an ultimatum by European powers, which affirmed the Millerites' beliefs. [Note: this occurred during the Millerite movement before the start of the Seventh-day Adventist Church, of which Litch did not become a member].

=== New World Order ===

Eschatological expectations have prompted some Adventists to closely observe current geopolitical events, in a manner similar to a number of Christian futurists and dispensationalists. Illinois pastor A. Jan Marcussen has predicted the imminent rise of a global church-state alliance with the Papacy and U.S. Government as key players, along with other bodies such as the United Nations and the International Monetary Fund. The resulting New World Order would precipitate the final events of history: the "sealing" of Sabbath-keepers, a universal Sunday-law, the seven last plagues and Armageddon.

"Not only does the Bible not predict one world government before the kingdom of God; it denies it. "Just as you saw that the feet and toes were partly of baked clay and partly of iron, so this will be a divided kingdom" (Daniel 2:41). The Bible does however warn of "an alliance between church and state (see Revelation 17:3ff)."

"The prophecy of Revelation 13 declares that the power represented by the beast with lamblike horns shall cause "the earth and them which dwell therein" to worship the papacy—there symbolised by the beast "like unto a leopard."

He was granted power to give breath to the image of the beast, that the image of the beast should both speak and cause as many as would not worship the image of the beast to be killed. He causes all, both small and great, rich and poor, free and slave, to receive a mark on their right hand or on their foreheads, and that no one may buy or sell except one who has the mark or the name of the beast, or the number of his name.

— Revelation 13:15-17 NKJV

The beast with two horns is also to say "to them that dwell on the earth, that they should make an image to the beast;" and, furthermore, it is to command all, "both small and great, rich and poor, free and bond," to receive the mark of the beast. Revelation 13:11–16. It has been shown that the United States is the power represented by the beast with lamblike horns, and that this prophecy will be fulfilled when the United States shall enforce Sunday observance, which Rome claims as the special acknowledgement of her supremacy. But in this homage to the papacy the United States will not be alone. The influence of Rome in the countries that once acknowledged her dominion is still far from being destroyed. And prophecy foretells a restoration of her power. "I saw one of his heads as it were wounded to death; and his deadly wound was healed: and all the world wondered after the beast." Verse 3. The infliction of the deadly wound points to the downfall of the papacy in 1798. After this, says the prophet, "his deadly wound was healed: and all the world wondered after the beast." Paul states plainly that the "man of sin" will continue until the second advent. 2 Thessalonians 2:3–8. To the very close of time he will carry forward the work of deception. And the revelator declares, also referring to the papacy: "All that dwell upon the earth shall worship him, whose names are not written in the book of life." Revelation 13:8. The papacy will receive homage in the honour paid to the Sunday institution, that rests solely upon the authority of the Roman Church."

=== Antichrist ===
A mainstream view is represented in Day of the Dragon by Clifford Goldstein.

Seventh-day Adventists teach that the office of the papacy is the Antichrist, a belief so widely held by Protestants that it became known as the "Protestant view" of prophetic interpretation. In 1798, the French General Berthier exiled the Pope and took away all his authority, which was later restored in 1929. This is taken as a fulfillment of the prophecy that the Beast of Revelation would receive a deadly wound but that the wound would be healed. Adventists have attributed the wounding and resurgence in Revelation 13:3 to the papacy, referring to General Louis Berthier's capture of Pope Pius VI in 1798 and the pope's subsequent death in 1799.

A minority view by Samuele Bacchiocchi has suggested expanding the Antichrist concept to include also Islam. However the majority Adventist view today disagrees and holds to the traditional Adventist view of the papacy as the Antichrist.

=== Roman Catholicism ===
Modern "mainstream" Adventist literature continues to express the traditional Adventist teaching that Roman Catholicism, in coalition with other churches, will perpetrate religious oppression during a final end-time crisis, and that the Sabbath will be a key issue.

Seventh-day Adventists are convinced of the validity of our prophetic views, according to which humanity now lives close to the end of time. Adventists believe, on the basis of biblical predictions, that just prior to the second coming of Christ this earth will experience a period of unprecedented turmoil, with the seventh-day Sabbath as a focal point. In that context, we expect that world religions--including the major Christian bodies as key players--will align themselves with the forces in opposition to God and to the Sabbath. Once again the union of church and state will result in widespread religious oppression.

— "How Seventh-day Adventists View Roman Catholicism" (official statement)

==== 666: Vicarius Filii Dei ====
Revelation 13:18. "Here is wisdom. Let him that hath understanding count the number of the beast; for it is the number of a man; and his number is Six hundred threescore and six." Some Adventists have interpreted the number of the beast, 666, as corresponding to the title Vicarius Filii Dei of the Pope. In 1866, Uriah Smith became the first to propose this interpretation to the Seventh-day Adventist Church. See Review and Herald 28:196, November 20, 1866. In The United States in the Light of Prophecy, he wrote,

The pope wears upon his pontifical crown in jeweled letters, this title: "Vicarius Filii Dei," "Viceregent of the Son of God;" the numerical value of which title is just six hundred and sixty-six The most plausible supposition we have ever seen on this point is that here we find the number in question. It is the number of the beast, the papacy; it is the number of his name, for he adopts it as his distinctive title; it is the number of a man, for he who bears it is the "man of sin."

Prominent Adventist scholar J. N. Andrews also adopted this view. Uriah Smith maintained his interpretation in the various editions of Thoughts on Daniel and the Revelation, which was influential in the church. The Seventh-day Adventist Bible Commentary states, "Whether the inscription Vicarius Filii Dei appears on the tiara or the mitre is really beside the point. The title is admittedly applied to the pope, and that is sufficient for the purposes of prophecy. Various documents from the Vatican contain wording such as "Adorandi Dei Filii Vicarius, et Procurator quibus numen aeternum summam Ecclesiae sanctae dedit", which translates as is "As the worshipful Son of God's Vicar and Caretaker, to whom the eternal divine will has given the highest rank of the holy Church".

Samuele Bacchiocchi an Adventist scholar, and only Adventist to be awarded a gold medal by Pope Paul VI for the distinction of summa cum laude (Latin for "with highest praise"). has documented the pope using such a title.

We noted that contrary to some Catholic sources who deny the use of Vicarius Filii Dei as a papal title, we have found this title to have been used in official Catholic documents to support the ecclesiastical authority and temporal sovereignty of the pope. Thus the charge that Adventists fabricated the title to support their prophetic interpretation of 666, is unfair and untrue.

— ' Samuele Bacchiocchi, slide 116

The Adult Sabbath School Lesson for April–June 2002, principally authored by Ángel Rodríguez, cast doubt on the early interpretation, instead advocating a symbolic interpretation of "intensified rebellion, six used three times, and total independence from God". see Adult Sabbath School Lesson for April–June 2002. See lesson 10 (June 1–7), "The Dragon Versus the Remnant Part 2"; particularly the studies for Thursday and Friday. The quarterly topic was "Great Apocalyptic Prophecies".

=== Sunday law ===
Traditionally, Adventists teach that right at the end times the message of the Ten Commandments and in particular the keeping of the seventh day of the week, Saturday, as Sabbath will be conveyed to the whole world and there will be a reaction from those who hold to Sunday as the day of worship. Adventists have taught that a persecuting "Sunday law" will be enacted at some stage in the future, as part of the final events of earth's history before Jesus returns, as stated in significant publications such as Questions on Doctrine (1957), Seventh-day Adventists Believe... (1988), and Ellen White's classic The Great Controversy. Jon Paulien has argued for a parallel between Revelation 14 and the fourth of the Ten Commandments (the Sabbath), in Exodus 20. He hence argues the Bible features Sabbath in the end-times.

Some progressive Adventists, including a few scholars, disagree with specific traditional views about the "time of trouble.".

=== Armageddon ===
Adventists believe in a future final battle prior to Jesus' return.

This battle is termed "Armageddon" in Revelation 16:16, a term which occurs only once in the Bible. It derives from the Hebrew for "Mountain of Megiddo", and occurs only in Revelation 16:16 in the Bible. Modern Adventist scholarship believes it refers not to a physical battle in the Middle East, but is a metaphor for a spiritual battle. There is no mountain called "Megiddo", but the city Megiddo, now ruined, lies in the Jezreel Valley, at the foot of Mount Carmel which was the site of Elijah's conflict with the prophets of Baal (1 Kings 18). Based in this imagery, Armageddon is understood as a worldwide 'spiritual' battle – a battle for the mind. Paulien believes it is not literal fire, and not literally on Carmel, but likely false prophets and false Christs performing miracles in the world (Matthew 24:24). The Euphrates river is equated with the "many waters" the prostitutes sits on, which the Bible identifies as peoples, multitudes, nations, and languages. Thus the drying of the river is the removal of the political powers supporting Babylon. (Earlier, Uriah Smith viewed the drying of the Euphrates river (Revelation 16:12) as the shrinking of Turkey, the nation occupying most of the river; however today this is Iraq. He saw Armageddon as a literal battle at Megiddo in Israel due to its strategic military location, and the three unclean spirits as spiritism.)

== Sources ==
=== Prophecy Seminars ===
A "prophecy seminar" is a common form of outreach used by Adventist ministers, in which Bible prophecies such as those in the books of Daniel and Revelation are presented.

In 1969 George Knowles developed a small group seminar. He joined It Is Written, and together with George Vandeman prepared a day-long seminar, which developed into the It Is Written Revelation Seminar by 1975. Soon others ran their own seminars. A resource center founded in Texas in 1980 was named Seminars Unlimited in 1986, and by the 1990s was distributing evangelistic materials to Adventists worldwide.

Some currently used seminars are:

- Prophecy Seminar. USA: Seminars Unlimited, 1989. 32 studies
- Revelation Seminar. Review and Herald / Revelation Seminars (by Seminars Unlimited of Keene, Texas), 1983. 24 studies
- Focus on Prophecy. Voice of Prophecy, 2000. 21 studies, consisting of Focus on Daniel (studies 1–7) and Focus on Revelation (studies 8–20); number 21 is a summary, The Prophecies of Daniel and Revelation
- Daniel. Ringwood, Victoria: Australian Union Conference Resource Centre, 2004. 16 studies

The seminar Revelation: Hope, Meaning, Purpose was written primarily by Jon Paulien and Graeme Bradford, and published under the guidance of the Biblical Research Committee of the South Pacific Division in 2010. It consists of 24 sessions, available as printed booklets and also on 12 DVDs.

=== Daniel and Revelation Committee Series ===
The Daniel and Revelation Committee Series (DARCOM) is one of the foremost Adventist sources, and consists of the following volumes:

- Vol. 1 Selected Studies on Prophetic Interpretation by William H. Shea
- Vol. 2 Symposium on Daniel, edited by Frank B. Holbrook
- Vol. 3 70 Weeks, Leviticus, and the Nature of Prophecy, edited by Frank B. Holbrook
- Vol. 4 Issues in the Book of Hebrews, edited by Frank B. Holbrook
- Vol. 5 Doctrine of the Sanctuary, edited by Frank B. Holbrook
- Vol. 6 Symposium on Revelation-Book I, edited by Frank B. Holbrook
- Vol. 7 Symposium on Revelation-Book II, edited by Frank B. Holbrook

=== Evangelists ===
Adventist evangelists such as Mark Finley, Doug Batchelor, Dwight Nelson, John Carter, John Bradshaw, and Joey Suarez form a major popular face of the church, through their ministries at a local level and/or their appearances in public and on Adventist television networks such as 3ABN, It Is Written, and the Hope Channel. 3ABN founder Danny Shelton is comparable.

Comparison of Christian millennial interpretations

== Comparison to other Christian views ==
The Seventh-day Adventist Church fits into the premillennial school of end-time belief, although it is taught that the millennial reign of Christ takes place in heaven instead of on Earth. There are several unique aspects of the denomination's teaching, such as the investigative judgment and the idea of a "Sunday law", which are shared by no other Christian denomination.

Seventh-day Adventism's eschatological teaching may be contrasted with:

- Dispensational Premillennialism, which teaches that a rapture of Christians will occur prior to a Great Tribulation of seven years' duration; this will be followed by a millennial reign of Christ on earth. Dispensational premillennialism is held by a number of evangelicals in the United States.
- Postmillennialism, which teaches that the second coming of Christ will occur after the millennium. Postmillennialism has declined in popularity in the twentieth century.
- Amillennialism, which teaches that the millennium of Revelation 20 is symbolic of the present age (between the first and second comings of Christ), when Christ rules his church from his seat at the right hand of God. Amillennialism is the view essentially held by the Roman Catholic Church, as well as by a number of conservative and liberal Protestant churches and by the Eastern Orthodox, Oriental Orthodox and the Assyrian Church of the East.

== See also ==
- Biblical Research Institute
- Christian eschatology
- Daniel's 70 Weeks prophecy
- William Miller (preacher)
- Millerites
- Pre-advent judgment
- Prophecy in the Seventh-day Adventist Church
- Seventh-day Adventist theology
- Teachings of Ellen White (End times)
- The Pillars of Adventism
