= Clifford Goldstein =

American author and editor (born 1955)

Clifford R. Goldstein (born in 1955) is an American author and editor. He is a leading figure in the Seventh-day Adventist denomination and espouses mainline Adventist beliefs.

== Biography ==
Goldstein was born in Albany, New York in the United States. He was raised a secular Jew, but became a Seventh-day Adventist in 1980. He studied at Southern College and at Outpost Centers International. He received a B.A. from the University of Florida.

He edited the journal Shabbat Shalom from 1984 till 1992. In the early 90s, Goldstein interpreted the end of the Cold War as a new sign of the end of the world, with the end of the Soviet Union as the end of "the most implacable barrier to Adventist eschatology." He was a popular apocalyptic writer in the church at this time.

In 1992 he received a M.A. in Ancient Northwest Semitic languages from Johns Hopkins University. He was the editor of Liberty magazine from 1992 till 1997. He became the editor of the Adventist Adult Sabbath School Lesson in 1999. He wrote the 2006 third quarter (July to September) edition, entitled The Gospel, 1844, and Judgment, which upheld the traditional views of the 1844 investigative judgment and heavenly sanctuary teachings.

Goldstein and his wife Kimberly have two children.

== Beliefs ==
According to Goldstein he has never been a member of the Adventist Theological Society (ATS). However he has been described as one of the two "effective spokesmen for the ATS perspective", and "the most visible and vocal exponent of the ATS agenda".

He is known to espouse the belief that one cannot be an Adventist and an Evolutionist, a claim that some disagree with.

== Publications ==
- 1844 Made Simple (1989) (publisher's page)
- Best Seller (1990), republished as The Clifford Goldstein Story (1996) (publisher's page), an autobiography
- How Dare You Judge Us, God (1991)
- False Balances (1992)
- A Pause for Peace: What God's Gift of the Sabbath Can Mean to You (1992)
- The Day of the Dragon (1993) (publisher's page). Excerpt "The Hypocrisy of the Adventist Left" reprinted in Adventist Today
- The Remnant: Biblical Reality or Wishful Thinking? (1994) (publisher's page)
- Between the Lamb and the Lion (1995)
- One Nation Under God? (1996)
- Children of the Promise (1997) (publisher's page)
- Like a Fire in My Bones (1998)
- By His Stripes (1999)
- The Day Evil Dies (1999) (publisher's page)
- The Great Compromise (2001) (publisher's page)
- God, Gödel, and Grace: A Philosophy of Faith (2003) (publisher's page)
- Graffiti in the Holy of Holies (2004) (publisher's page). Chapter 5: "The Gospel and the Judgment" and Chapter 7: "The Gift of Prophecy" reprinted on the Adventist Review website
- The Mules That Angels Ride (2005) (publisher's page)
- Life Without Limits (publisher's pages: normal version, deluxe version)
- Risen: Finding Hope in the Empty Tomb (2020) (publisher's page)

Touch Points tracts.

== See also ==
- Seventh-day Adventist Church
- Seventh-day Adventist theology
- Seventh-day Adventist eschatology
- History of the Seventh-day Adventist Church
- 28 fundamental beliefs
- Questions on Doctrine
- Teachings of Ellen White
- Inspiration of Ellen White
- Prophecy in the Seventh-day Adventist Church
- Investigative judgment
- The Pillars of Adventism
- Second Advent
- Baptism by Immersion
- Conditional Immortality
- Historicism
- End times
- Ellen G. White
