= Ángel Manuel Rodríguez =

American theologian

Ángel M. Rodríguez

Personal details
- Born: 1945 (age 80–81) Springfield, MA
- Occupation: Protestant, Seventh-day Adventist Theologian

Ángel Manuel Rodríguez (1945—) is a Seventh-day Adventist theologian and was the director of the Biblical Research Institute (BRI) before his retirement. His special research interests include Old Testament, Sanctuary and Atonement, and Old Testament Theology. He has written several books, and authors a monthly column in Adventist World.

== Biography ==
Rodríguez received a Doctor of Theology (Th.D.) in biblical theology from Andrews University.

He was the president of Antillean College, and the academic vice president of Southwestern Adventist University.

He has worked for the Biblical Research Institute since 1992, serving as director from 2001 until 2011.

Woodrow Whidden has said,

"I have the highest respect for the staff of the BRI and especially consider Angel Rodriguez, the current director, to be the most able defender of the Adventist faith in our time."

== See also ==
- Seventh-day Adventist Church
- Seventh-day Adventist theology
- Seventh-day Adventist eschatology
- History of the Seventh-day Adventist Church
- 28 Fundamental Beliefs
- Questions on Doctrine
- Teachings of Ellen G. White
- Inspiration of Ellen G. White
- Prophecy in the Seventh-day Adventist Church
- Investigative judgment
- Pillars of Adventism
- Second Coming
- Conditional Immortality
- Historicism
- Three Angels' Messages
- Sabbath in seventh-day churches
- Ellen G. White
- Adventist Review
- Adventism
- Seventh-day Adventist Church Pioneers
- Seventh-day Adventist worship
- Ellen G. White Estate
- Biblical Research Institute
- General Conference of Seventh-day Adventists
