= Geoffrey Paxton =

The Reverend Geoffrey J. Paxton has been an ordained minister in the Anglican Church of Australia. He is a graduate of Australian College of Theology and the University of Queensland. He tutored in the history of Christian thought at the University of Queensland, and in Greek and New Testament studies in the Brisbane College of Theology. Paxton traveled extensively in the United States, Britain, South Africa, the Philippines and New Zealand lecturing in Reformation theology. He has also held classes on homiletics (preaching) for over a decade.

== Biography ==
Paxton served as the first resident minister at The Gap Anglican Church in Brisbane, and was principal of the Queensland Bible Institute (now Brisbane School of Theology) in Brisbane, Australia for 7 years. The Maleny Anglican Parish Church bulletin for May 15, 2016 lists a Reverend Geoffrey Paxton as deceased that year; whether this is the same Paxton or not is uncertain.

=== Interaction with Adventists ===
Paxton has had significant interaction with the Seventh-day Adventist Church, and a "keen interest" in its theology. This began through his acquaintance with Robert Brinsmead, as both were critical of the charismatic movement. One source described the pair as "anti-Charismatic crusaders" after one meeting. They held public meetings supporting belief in justification by faith alone. Paxton contributed to Brinsmead's Present Truth Magazine.

He published The Shaking of Adventism in 1977, about the struggle within the Adventist church over what it means to be saved, and also over the nature of Christ. It evaluates the Adventist claim to being heirs of the Protestant Reformation. The title comes from the traditional concept in Adventism of a "shaking" time.

The Adventist magazine Spectrum devoted a special section to the book (see below). Also Adventist Richard Rice affirmed the book's review of past and then-present views of salvation in Adventism as "well informed and generally accurate", yet claims the standard by which Paxton compares Adventist views as "artificial". He says, "Paxton reads more into their claim to be heirs of the Reformation than most Adventists do," and "the Reformers themselves held that justification and sanctification are inseparable."

Paxton lost his job at the Bible school because of his association with Adventists, or as Desmond Ford puts it, "because of his refusal to lay aside his interest in the Adventist 'cult'."

== See also ==
- Seventh-day Adventist interfaith relations
