= Journal of the Adventist Theological Society =

- Discipline: Christian theology
- Language: English

Publication details
- History: Started 1990 (36 years ago)
- Publisher: Adventist Theological Society (Collegedale, Tennessee, United States)
- Frequency: Biannual

Standard abbreviations
- ISO 4: J. Advent. Theol. Soc.

Indexing
- ISSN: 1550-7378
- OCLC no.: 38543183

Links
- Journal homepage

The Journal of the Adventist Theological Society (JATS) is an American refereed scholarly Christian journal published by the Adventist Theological Society, an adventist group. It is issued twice a year from Collegedale, Tennessee.

== History and operations ==
The first issue was published in 1990.

In 1996, its circulation was around 10,000, the "great majority" of which were distributed freely.

As well as Adventist readership, copies are distributed to every member of the Evangelical Theological Society, nearly 2,000 in total.

== See also ==
- Andrews University Seminary Studies
- List of Seventh-day Adventist periodicals
- List of theology journals
