= Three Angels' Messages =

Interpretation of Revelation 14:6–12, regarding the second coming

The "three angels' messages" is an interpretation of the messages given by three angels in Revelation 14:6–12. The Seventh-day Adventist church teaches that these messages are given to prepare the world for the second coming of Jesus Christ, and sees them as a central part of its own mission.

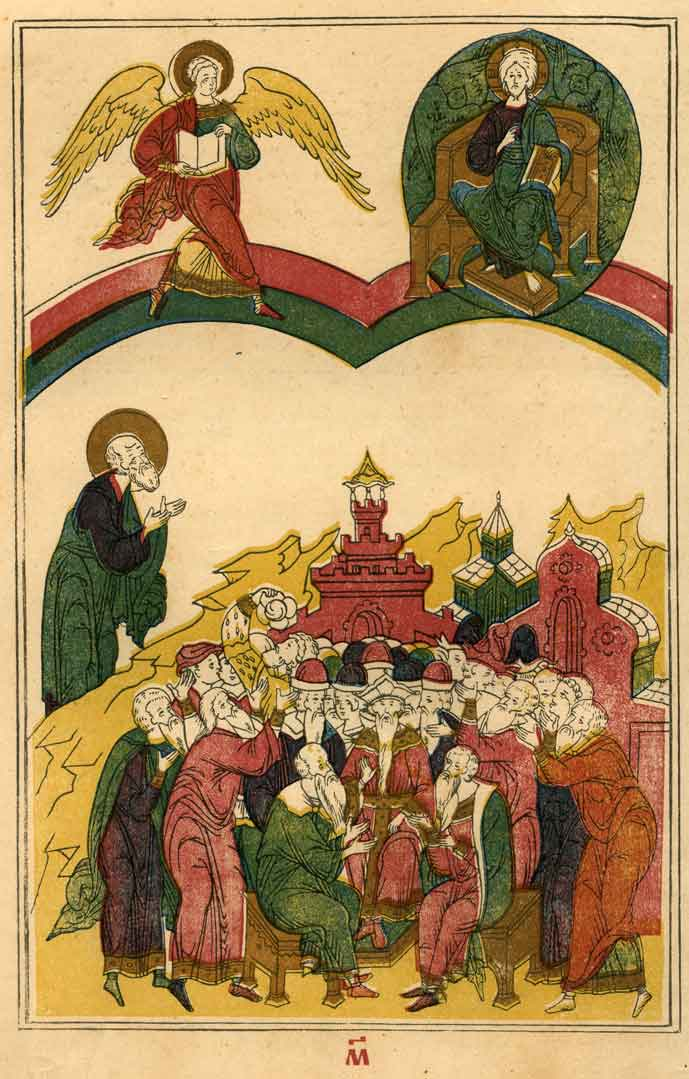
The first angel proclaims the judgment and calls on mankind to worship God. (Old Believer Apocalypse, 1909)

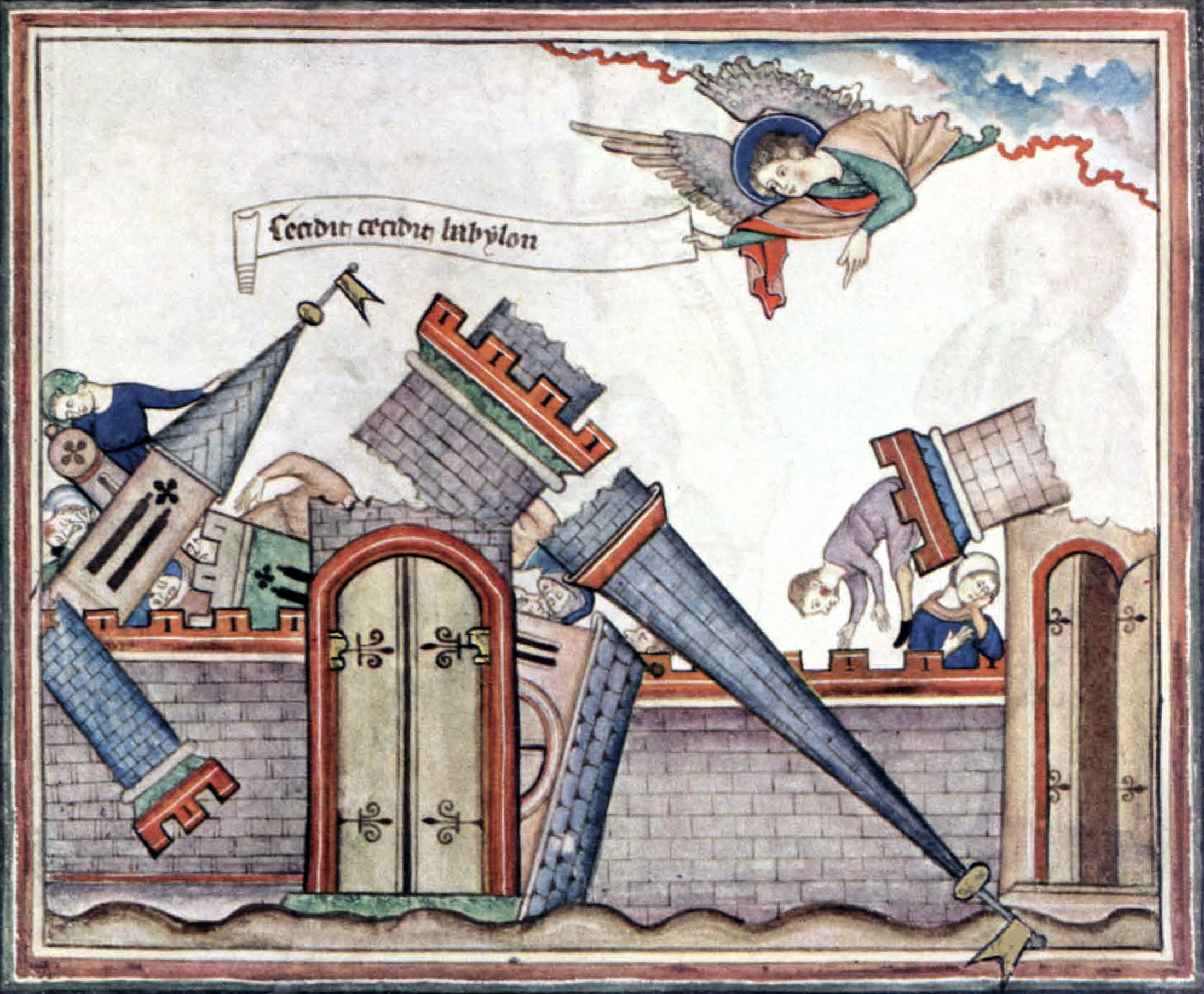
The second angel proclaims the fall of Babylon. (Cloisters Apocalypse, c. 1330)

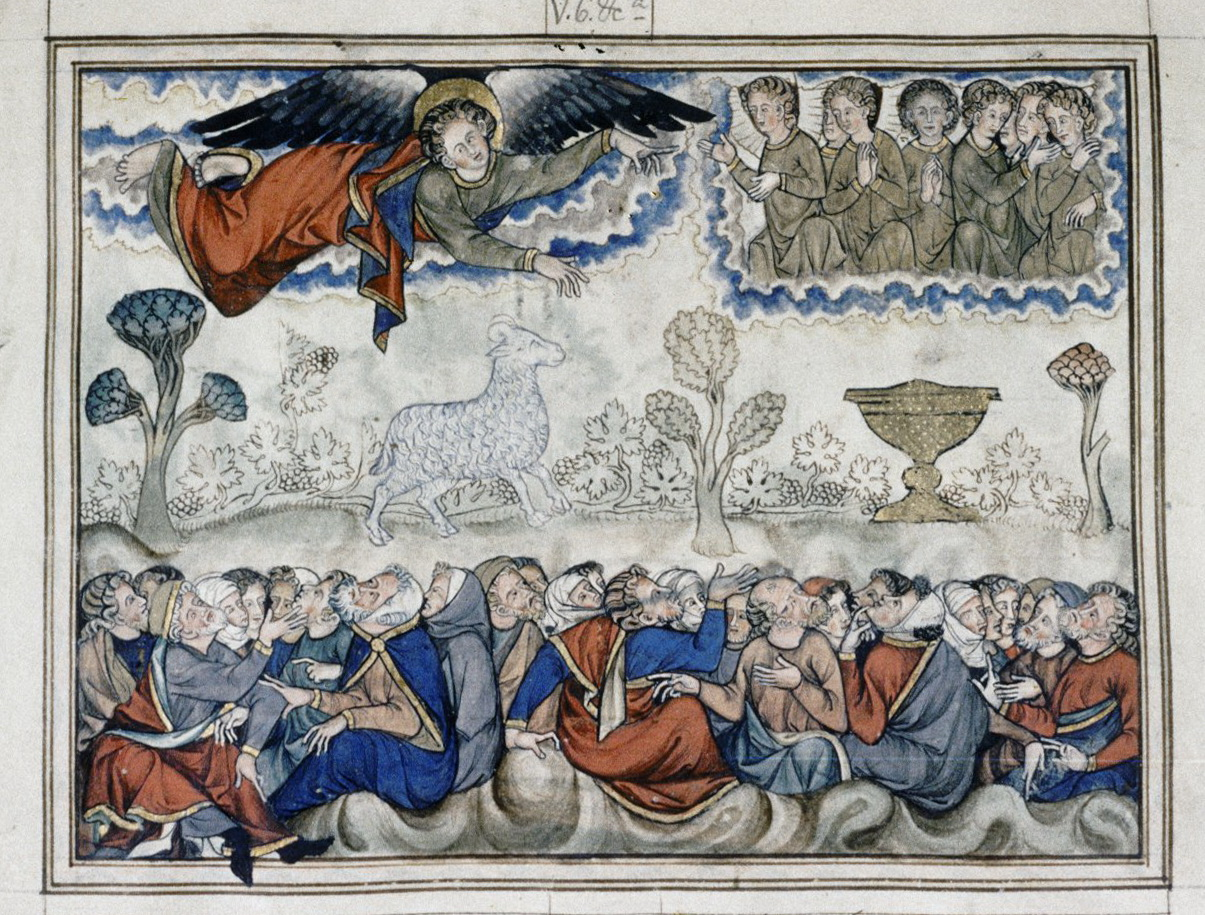
The third angel describes the punishments of those who continue to worship the Beast. (Douce Apocalypse, c. 1265–70)

The three angels depicted in art

== Messages ==
The three messages are as follows:

- Angel One (Rev 14:6–7): "Fear God and give him glory, because the hour of his judgment has come. Worship him who made the heavens, the earth, the sea and the springs of water."
- Angel Two (Rev 14:8): "Fallen! Fallen is Babylon the Great, which made all the nations drink the maddening wine of her adulteries."
- Angel Three (Rev 14:9–11): "If anyone worships the beast and its image and receives its mark on their forehead or on their hand, they, too, will drink the wine of God's fury, which has been poured full strength into the cup of his wrath. They will be tormented with burning sulfur in the presence of the holy angels and of the Lamb. And the smoke of their torment will rise for ever and ever. There will be no rest day or night for those who worship the beast and its image, or for anyone who receives the mark of its name." (all quotes are NIV)

The Three Angels' messages of Revelation 14 are highly significant to the Seventh-day Adventist Church. In the SDA Church's official mission statement, the Three Angels' Messages are prominent: The mission of the Seventh-day Adventist Church is to proclaim to all peoples the everlasting gospel in the context of the Three Angels' messages of Revelation 14:6–12.

== Adventist interpretations ==
The Seventh-day Adventist Church has traditionally believed that it is the remnant church of Bible prophecy, and that its mission is to proclaim the three angels' messages which it uses in its signs and logos.

=== Official views ===
"The universal church is composed of all who truly believe in Christ, but in the last days, a time of widespread apostasy, a remnant has been called out to keep the commandments of God and the faith of Jesus. This remnant announces the arrival of the judgment hour, proclaims salvation through Christ, and heralds the approach of His second advent. This proclamation is symbolized by the three angels of Revelation 14; it coincides with the work of judgment in heaven and results in a work of repentance and reform on earth. Every believer is called to have a personal part in this worldwide witness."
Fundamental Beliefs of the Seventh-day Adventist Church
"In accordance with God's uniform dealing with mankind, warning them of coming events that will vitally affect their destiny, He has sent forth a proclamation of the approaching return of Christ. This preparatory message is symbolized by the three angels' messages of Revelation 14, and meets its fulfillment in the great Second Advent Movement today. This has brought forth the remnant, or Seventh-day Adventist Church, keeping the commandments of God and the faith of Jesus."
Seventh-day Adventist Church Manual

The Mission Statement of the church declares:

"The mission of the Seventh-day Adventist Church is to proclaim to all peoples the everlasting gospel of God's love in the context of the three angels' messages of Revelation 14:6–12, and as revealed in the life, death, resurrection, and high priestly ministry of Jesus Christ, leading them to accept Jesus as personal Saviour and Lord and to unite with His remnant church; and to nurture believers as disciples in preparation for His soon return."

The image of three angels circling a globe is the church's former symbol. The current logo of the Seventh-day Adventist church has three flames encircling the globe, representing the Holy Spirit; the threefold flame is also a symbol of the three angels.

=== Millerite interpretations ===
According to the understanding of the Adventist pioneers, the first angel's message occurred during the two decades prior to the spring of 1844. The message of the imminent second coming of Jesus preached by the Millerite movement then fulfilled the prophecy of the first angel's message.

The second angel's message was then preached during the (northern-hemisphere) summer of 1844, which was preceded by a significant number of Millerites leaving the movement, and resulted in large numbers of Christians leaving their churches ("Babylon") and joining the Advent movement.

The third angel's message is based on the idea that the "Seal of God" (Revelation 7:2) is the Sabbath commandment of the decalogue. Therefore, the "mark of the beast" is the opposite, or the keeping of Sunday as the Sabbath. Hence the close of the message, "here are they that keep the commandments of God." It is a point of emphasis among Adventists that the mark of the beast has not yet been given out.

(The Millerites generally interpreted "Babylon" in the Book of Revelation as the papacy, up through summer 1843. This position aligned with that of most Protestants. Millerite preacher Charles Fitch expanded the idea of "Babylon" to include all Catholics and Protestants who rejected the Adventist teaching. His message was "Come out of her, my people" - based on Revelation 18:2,4 (see also 14:8). This had followed a shift in 1843 when the Millerites received more ridicule, and were increasingly disfellowshipped by their churches. The Millerites came to see themselves as a separate group, increasingly so as many of them experienced disfellowshipping.

Most of the eastern leaders did not initially accept Fitch's pronouncements, yet many laypeople did. Eventually and reluctantly Joshua V. Himes came to advocate Fitch's interpretation of the message in autumn 1844. William Miller himself never affirmed it, despite being disfellowshipped from his church.)

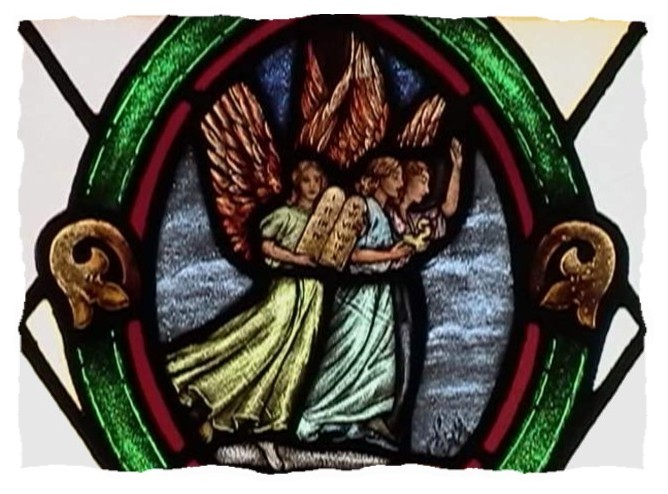
Stained-glass depiction of the Three Angels' Messages

=== Standard view ===
When Jesus did not return in 1844 as expected by the Millerite movement, the resulting Seventh-day Adventist movement came to see itself as the remnant of God and believed that their mission was to preach the three angels' messages again.

The first angel's message is the "everlasting gospel", namely the "good news of God's infinite love". It is also a warning that the investigative judgment has begun and a call to worship the Creator of the world, specifically in the keeping of the Sabbath commandment. "The first angel's message ... calls for the restoration of true worship by presenting before the world Christ the Creator and Lord of the Bible Sabbath [which is] the sign of God's Creation."

The second angel's message is a call to those in Babylon to "depart from her" (cf. Revelation 18:4). Adventists traditionally believe that Babylon represents the apostate church, which they identify as Roman Catholicism as well as Protestants who have rejected the truth. "This prophecy of Babylon's fall especially finds its fulfillment in the departure of Protestantism at large from the purity and simplicity of the everlasting gospel of righteousness by faith that once so powerfully impelled the Reformation." This explains why Adventists often aim their evangelism at Christians in other churches as well as non-Christians. "The message of the fall of Babylon ... calls on those of God's people who are still in the various religious bodies comprising Babylon to separate from them." However, Adventists have also made it clear that there are currently many true believers in "Babylon" who worship God sincerely, including Roman Catholics.

Theologian Ángel Manuel Rodríguez explains the mission of the remnant in terms of the second angel's message: "The end-time remnant is described in Revelation as having a God-given mission and a particular message to the whole world. They are to call the people of God to come out of Babylon, that is to say, to join the historical, faithful and visible end-time remnant of God.'

The third angel's message is a solemn warning against observance of Sunday as a sacred day, which Adventists have historically interpreted as the mark of the beast. "Those who reject God's memorial of creatorship—the Bible Sabbath—choosing to worship and honor Sunday in the full knowledge that it is not God's appointed day of worship, will receive the 'mark of the beast.'" Adventists believe that the mark of the beast will only be received at a future date, when every person on earth is made aware of their obligation to keep the Sabbath; in other words, Christians who currently worship on Sunday do not have the mark.

=== Alternate view ===
Some in the more liberal wing, Progressive Adventists, typically reject the claim that the three angels' messages find a fulfillment in the Seventh-day Adventist Church.

Mainstream Adventists believe that God has led the Christian movements in history, but progressives tend to not hold to that view or at all.

Progressive Adventists such as Steve Daily have challenged the traditional understanding of the Remnant, preferring to widen the concept to include Christians in non-Adventist churches.

== Culture ==
The concept appears in the title of the Three Angels Broadcasting Network (3ABN).

This illustration of the angel of Revelation 14:6 is from the title page of Luther's Bible.

== Lutheran interpretation ==
Siebert Becker of the Wisconsin Evangelical Lutheran Synod explained that some have held the angel in verse 6 to be Martin Luther. This is an example of historicism. Becker preferred the idealistic interpretation that the angel's work was not limited "to one specific time and one specific event." This is in contrast to P. E. Kretzmann, who wrote:

This passage has been understood by Lutheran commentators, to apply to Doctor Martin Luther and the Reformation. For he, as the angel of the Lord, different from the other angels spoken of in the previous chapters, brought back and preached the eternal Gospel of the justification of a poor sinner through the merits of Jesus Christ alone, by faith.

Kretzmann does not give a name to the other two angels.

== See also ==
- Seventh-day Adventist eschatology
- The Pillars of Adventism
- History of the Seventh-day Adventist Church
- List of angels in theology
- Prophecy in the Seventh-day Adventist Church
- Investigative judgment
- Revelation 14
