= Pillars of Adventism =

Landmark doctrines for Seventh-day Adventists

The Pillars of Adventism are landmark doctrines for Seventh-day Adventists. They are Bible doctrines that define who they are as a people of faith; doctrines that are "non-negotiables" in Adventist theology. The Seventh-day Adventist church teaches that these Pillars are needed to prepare the world for the second coming of Jesus Christ, and sees them as a central part of its own mission. Adventists teach that the Seventh-day Adventist Church doctrines were both a continuation of the reformation started in the 16th century and a movement of the end time rising from the Millerites, bringing God's final messages and warnings to the world.

== The Pillars of Adventism ==
The early Adventists emphasized the concept of "present truth"—see 2 Peter 1:12 (NKJV). James White explained, "The church [has] ever had a present truth. The present truth now, is that which shows present duty, and the right position for us..." "Present truth is present truth, and not future truth, and the Word as a lamp shines brightly where we stand, and not so plainly on the path in the distance." Ellen White pointed out that "present truth, which is a test to the people of this generation, was not a test to the people of generations far back." This view is echoed in the preamble to the 28 Fundamentals: "...Revision of these statements may be expected at a General Conference session when the church is led by the Holy Spirit to a fuller understanding of Bible truth or finds better language in which to express the teachings of God's Holy Word." The founders of the SDA church had a dynamic concept of what they called present truth, opposed to creedal rigidity, and had an openness to new theological understandings that built upon the landmark doctrines that had made them a people.

Yet, the possibilities of dynamic change in Seventh-day Adventist beliefs were not unlimited. Those landmark doctrines were non-negotiables in Adventist theology. Collectively they had provided the Seventh-day Adventists with an identity. In their eyes the pillars of their faith—the Bible doctrines that defined who they were as a people—had been thoroughly studied out in the Scripture and had been attested to by the convicting power of the Holy Spirit. As Ellen White put it, "When the power of God testifies as to what is truth, that truth is to stand forever as the truth. ... Men will arise with interpretations of Scripture which are to them truth, but which are not truth. The truth for this time, God has given us as a foundation for our faith. Robert Johnston noted, "Without repudiating the past leading of the Lord, it [the Seventh-day Adventist church] seeks even to understand better what that leading was. It is always open to better insights to learn—to seek for truth as for hid treasure. ... Adventists are still pilgrims on a doctrinal journey who do not repudiate the way marks, but neither do they remain stopped at any of them."

Out of the Millerite movement grew the Seventh-day Adventist Church. They adopted many core beliefs from the Protestant churches they came from, and not only brought new understanding as they unveiled many prophetic light that had been forgotten and continued reforms that had been lost since the Reformation. These doctrines were grounded on Scriptural teaching about some of the following concepts which underpinned the developing doctrines of the growing church:

- The Second Coming of Christ
- The binding claims of the Seventh-day Sabbath
- The Third Angel's Message in relation to the First and Second Angels' Messages
- The ministry of Christ in the heavenly sanctuary
- The non-immortality of the soul

== Seven Distinctive SDA Doctrines ==
Under the article "Landmarks" in The Seventh-day Adventist Encyclopedia (vol. 10, pp. 682, 683), mention is made of seven distinctive SDA pillars. Though similar reference does not appear under other intuitive headings such as Pillars, Waymarks, Special Points, Foundations, Pegs, Pins, or Platforms, all these terms are roughly synonymous with Landmarks. In Comprehensive Index to the Writings of Ellen G. White, vol. 2, the entry for Pillar(s) on p. 2061 is cross-referenced to Landmark, the only term among the eight named here with a corresponding entry in the Encyclopedia.

Ellen White wrote on these landmarks or pillars, "Let the truths that are the foundation of our faith be kept before the people. Some will depart from the faith, giving heed to seducing spirits and doctrines of devils. They talk science, and the enemy comes in and gives them an abundance of science; but it is not the science of salvation. It is not the science of humility, of consecration, or of the sanctification of the spirit. We are now to understand what the pillars of our faith are,-- the truths that have made us as a people what we are, leading us on step by step." (Review and Herald, May 25, 1905)

In her book Counsels to Writers and Editors, White was more descriptive. "The passing of the time in 1844 was a period of great events, opening to our astonished eyes the cleansing of the sanctuary transpiring in heaven, and having decided relation to God's people upon the earth, [also] the first and second angels' messages and the third, unfurling the banner on which was inscribed, "The commandments of God and the faith of Jesus [including Righteousness by Faith]." One of the landmarks under this message was the temple of God, seen by His truth-loving people in heaven, and the ark containing the law of God. The light of the Sabbath of the fourth commandment flashed its strong rays in the pathway of the transgressors of God's law. The nonimmortality of the wicked is an old landmark".

These foundations, pillars, and landmarks are:

- the Second Advent (Second Coming of Christ),
- the Sanctuary, the Investigative Judgment,
- the Sabbath of the Fourth Commandment
- the law of God,
- the State of the Dead (Conditional Immortality),
- the Three Angels' Messages of Revelation,
- the faith of Jesus, and
- the special Gift of Prophecy.

The foundation of Seventh-Day Adventism was being set between 1840 and 1844 and led to many of these landmarks being spread among the early believers. Seventh-Day Adventists believe they are repeating the history of the Jewish nation at Christ's first Advent. The Jews strayed so far from true doctrine that they did not recognize Him who was the very foundation of their system of worship. Their error and tradition led them to reject Christ and close their probation on the wrong side of the Great Controversy. Spiritual Israel is in a similar position now at the end of the world with many Protestant denominations drifting and forgetting the truths which they were built on. These early Adventists came to understand present truth and the Pillars prepare the church to stand through the coming end times and perform the work of restoring the true foundation given from scripture.

=== The faith of Jesus (Righteousness of Christ) ===
Early Adventists understood the "faith of Jesus" as something that needed to be kept. It was descriptive of Jesus' faith that Adventists wanted to emulate. It included "the New Testament requirements, such as repentance, faith, baptism, Lord's Supper, washing the saints' feet, etc." that Jesus practiced. This position countered those in the Protestant world who considered those requirements to be the "commandments of God." By identifying them as the "faith of Jesus," Adventists distinguished and preserved the perennial imperatives of the Ten Commandments and the Sabbath.

=== The Three Angels' Messages ===
The Seventh-day Adventist Church has traditionally believed that it is the remnant church of Bible prophecy, and that its mission is to proclaim the three angels' messages.

"The universal church is composed of all who truly believe in Christ, but in the last days, a time of widespread apostasy, a remnant has been called out to keep the commandments of God and the faith of Jesus. This remnant announces the arrival of the judgment hour, proclaims salvation through Christ, and heralds the approach of His second advent. This proclamation is symbolized by the three angels of Revelation 14; it coincides with the work of judgment in heaven and results in the act of repentance and reform on earth. Every believer is called to have a personal part in this worldwide witness."
Fundamental Beliefs of the Seventh-day Adventist Church

"In accordance with God's uniform dealing with mankind, warning them of coming events that will vitally affect their destiny, He has sent forth a proclamation of the approaching return of Christ. This preparatory message is symbolized by the three angels' messages of Revelation 14, and meets its fulfillment in the great Second Advent Movement today. This has brought forth the remnant, or Seventh-day Adventist Church, keeping the commandments of God and the faith of Jesus."
Seventh-day Adventist Church Manual

In Fundamental Belief #13:

"The universal church is composed of all who truly believe in Christ, but in the last days, a time of widespread apostasy, a remnant has been called out to keep the commandments of God and the faith of Jesus. This remnant announces:

"1. the arrival of the judgment hour, "2. proclaims salvation through Christ, and "3. heralds the approach of His second advent.

"This proclamation is symbolized by the three angels of Revelation 14; it coincides with the work of judgment in heaven and results in the act of repentance and reform on earth. Every believer is called to have a personal part in this worldwide witness.

=== The special Gift of Prophecy ===
Fundamental Belief #18:

"In the last days, as in biblical times, the Holy Spirit has blessed God's people with the gift of prophecy. One who demonstrated this gift was Ellen G. White, one of the founding pioneers of the Seventh-day Adventist church.

"The Scriptures testify that one of the gifts of the Holy Spirit is prophecy. This gift is an identifying mark of the remnant church and we believe it was manifested in the ministry of Ellen G. White. Her writings speak with prophetic authority and provide comfort, guidance, instruction, and correction to the church. They also make clear that the Bible is the standard by which all teaching and experience must be tested.

The church believes the spiritual gift of prophecy was manifested in the ministry of Ellen White, whose writings are sometimes referred to as the "Spirit of Prophecy". Two other official statements regarding the prophetic ministry of Ellen White have recently been voted at General Conference Sessions. The June 1995 document A Statement of Confidence in the Spirit of Prophecy states that White "did the work of a prophet, and more", and that her writings "carry divine authority, both for godly living and for doctrine"; and recommended that "as a church we seek the power of the Holy Spirit to apply to our lives more fully the inspired counsel contained in the writings of Ellen G White." The 2005 document Resolution on the Spirit of Prophecy called upon "Seventh-day Adventists throughout the world to prayerfully study her writings, in order to understand more fully God's purpose for His remnant people", describing her writings as "theological stimulus".

=== The law of God's love ===
In Fundamental Belief #19:

"The great principles of God's law are embodied in the Ten Commandments and exemplified in the life of Christ. They express God's love, will, and purposes concerning human conduct and relationships and are binding upon all people in every age.

"These precepts are the basis of God's covenant with His people and the standard in God's judgment. Through the agency of the Holy Spirit they point out sin and awaken a sense of need for a Saviour. Salvation is all of grace and not of works, but its fruitage is obedience to the Commandments. This obedience develops Christian character and results in a sense of well-being. It is an evidence of our love for the Lord and our concern for our fellow men. The obedience of faith demonstrates the power of Christ to transform lives, and therefore strengthens Christian witness.

Seventh-day Adventists believe that "the great principles of God's law are embodied in the Ten Commandments", and that these are "binding upon all people in every age" (Fundamental Belief no. 19). While the ceremonial and sacrificial laws of the Old Testament were fulfilled by the death of Jesus Christ, the 10 commandments are held to remain in force for Christian believers. The words of Jesus Christ in Matthew 5:17–20 are foundational to this conviction:

"Do not think that I have come to abolish the Law or the Prophets; I have not come to abolish them but to fulfill them. I tell you the truth, until heaven and earth disappear, not the smallest letter, not the least stroke of a pen, will by any means disappear from the Law until everything is accomplished. Anyone who breaks one of the least of these commandments and teaches others to do the same will be called least in the kingdom of heaven, but whoever practices and teaches these commands will be called great in the kingdom of heaven. For I tell you that unless your righteousness surpasses that of the Pharisees and the teachers of the law, you will certainly not enter the kingdom of heaven."

Adventist believe and teach that all humanity is obliged to keep God's Law, including the Sabbath, and that keeping all the commandments is a moral responsibility that honors, and shows love towards God as creator, sustainer, and redeemer.

=== The Sabbath ===
The seventh-day Sabbath, is observed from Friday sunset to Saturday sunset, and Adventist hold this time as what God blessed and hallowed at Creation. Adventist point to the biblical references such as the ancient Hebrew practice of beginning a day at sundown, and the Genesis creation narrative wherein an "evening and morning" established a day, predating the giving of the Ten Commandments (thus the command to "remember" the Sabbath). The seventh day of the week is recognized as Sabbath in many languages, calendars, and doctrines, including those of Catholic and Orthodox churches.

Adventist point out that the change of the Sabbath was part of a Great Apostasy in the Christian faith when the Bishop of Rome began to dominate the west and the other centers of Christianity. The Seventh-day Adventist has traditionally held that the apostate church formed and brought heathen corruption and allowed pagan idol worship and beliefs to come in under the Roman Catholic Church, which teaches other traditions over Scripture, and to rest from their work on Sunday, instead of Sabbath as written by the finger of God in the Commandments of God, including the Scriptures.

=== The investigative judgment and the sanctuary service ===
The investigative judgment is a unique Seventh-day Adventist doctrine, which asserts that the divine judgment of professed Christians has been in progress since 1844. This was what the Prophecy of the 2300-days prophecy timeline from Daniel 8:14 that spans 2300 years pointed to, that William Miller had seen, from 457 BC to AD 1844. It is intimately related to the history of the Seventh-day Adventist Church and was described by the church's prophet and pioneer Ellen G. White as one of the pillars of Adventist belief. It is a major component of the broader Adventist understanding of the "heavenly sanctuary", and the two are sometimes spoken of interchangeably.

Ellen White noted:

The scripture which above all others had been both the foundation and the central pillar of the advent faith was the declaration: "Unto two thousand and three hundred days; then shall the sanctuary be cleansed." Daniel 8:14. (The Great Controversy, p. 409)

=== The State of the Dead (and the Millennium) ===
Adventist believe that scripture reveals that the eternal God is immortal (1 Tim. 1:17). He is uncreated, self-existent, and has no beginning and no end. In fact, He "alone has immortality" (1 Tim. 6:16)

"The Scriptures nowhere describe immortality as a quality or state that man—or his 'soul' or 'spirit'—possesses inherently. The terms usually rendered 'soul' and 'spirit' ... in the Bible occur more than 1,600 times, but never in association with the words 'immortal' or 'immortality'". Adventist hold that scripture shows that human beings are mortal. Scripture compares their lives with "a vapor that appears for a little time and then vanishes away" (James 4:14). They are "but flesh, a breath that passes away and does not come again" (Ps. 78-39). Man "'comes forth like a flower and fades away; he flees like a shadow and does not continue'" (Job 14:2).

Adventist believe the Bible declares that God is infinite, human beings are finite. God is immortal, they are mortal. God is eternal, they are transitory.

The doctrine of the immortal soul caused much controversy in the early church and slowly was brought in from pagan sources. Origen was the first person to attempt to organize Christian doctrine into a systematic theology. He was an admirer of Plato and believed in the immortality of the soul and that it would depart to an everlasting reward or everlasting punishment at death. In De Principiis, Origen wrote: "... The soul, having a substance and life of its own, shall after its departure from the world, be rewarded according to its deserts, being destined to obtain either an inheritance of eternal life and blessedness, if its actions shall have procured this for it, or to be delivered up to eternal fire and punishments, if the guilt of its crimes shall have brought it down to this ..." (Ante-Nicene Fathers, Vol. 4, 1995, p. 240).

Later Augustine continued to expand the false pagan ideas of the immortality of the soul and death. For Augustine death meant the destruction of the body, but the conscious soul would continue to live in either a blissful state with God or an agonizing state of separation from God. The influences of pagan Platonic philosophy on Origen and Augustine was extensive. Centuries later Thomas Aquinas put their ideas together in the doctrine of the immortal soul in The Summa Theologica. He taught that the soul is a conscious intellect and will and cannot be destroyed.

Adventists teach that the resurrection of the righteous will take place at the second coming of Jesus, while the resurrection of the wicked will occur after the millennium of Revelation 20. They reject the traditional doctrine of hell as a state of everlasting conscious torment, believing instead that the wicked will be permanently destroyed after the millennium. The theological term for this teaching is Annihilationism.

The Adventist views about death and hell reflect an underlying belief in: (a) conditional immortality (or conditionalism), as opposed to the immortality of the soul; and (b) the holistic (or monistic) Christian anthropology or nature of human beings, as opposed to bipartite or tripartite views.

Adventist believe the Bible clearly teaches what the "spirit" that returns to God at death is. The body without the spirit ["breath,"] is dead." James 2:26. "The spirit of God ["the breath which God gave him,"] is in my nostrils." Job 27:3. They hold that the spirit that returns to God at death is the breath of life. Nowhere in all of God's book does the "spirit" have any life, wisdom, or feeling after a person dies. It is the "breath of life" and nothing more.

Adventist hold that what happens when a person dies is the body decays and only the "breath of life", the spirit goes back to God, who gave it. The breath of life of every person who dies—whether righteous or wicked—returns to God at death. Adventist believe they are restoring the true teachings of scripture when it comes to the state of the dead.

=== Overview ===
Shared Protestant doctrines which Seventh-day Adventists have are the central doctrines of Protestant Christianity: the Trinity, the incarnation, the virgin birth, the substitutionary atonement, justification by faith, creation, the second coming, the resurrection of the dead, and last judgment.

In Seventh-day Adventists Answer Questions on Doctrine (1957), four authors outlined the core doctrines that they share with Protestant Christianity.

"In Common With Conservative Christians and the Historic Protestant Creeds, We Believe—

1. That God is the Sovereign Creator, upholder, and ruler of the universe, and that He is eternal, omnipotent, omniscient, and omnipresent.
2. That the Godhead, the Trinity, comprises God the Father, Christ the Son, and the Holy Spirit.
3. That the Scriptures are the inspired revelation of God to men; and that the Bible is the sole rule of faith and practice.
4. That Jesus Christ is very God, and that He has existed with the Father from all eternity.
5. That the Holy Spirit is a personal being, sharing the attributes of deity with the Father and the Son.
6. That Christ, the Word of God, became incarnate through the miraculous conception and the virgin birth; and that He lived an absolutely sinless life here on earth.
7. That the vicarious, atoning death of Jesus Christ, once for all, is all-sufficient for the redemption of a lost race.
8. That Jesus Christ arose literally and bodily from the grave.
9. That He ascended literally and bodily into heaven.
10. That He now serves as our advocate in priestly ministry and mediation before the Father.
11. That He will return in a premillennial, personal, imminent second advent.
12. That man was created sinless, but by his subsequent fall entered a state of alienation and depravity.
13. That salvation through Christ is by grace alone, through faith in His blood.
14. That entrance upon the new life in Christ is by regeneration, or the new birth.
15. That man is justified by faith.
16. That man is sanctified by the indwelling Christ through the Holy Spirit.
17. That man will be glorified at the resurrection or translation of the saints, when the Lord returns.
18. That there will be a judgment of all men.
19. That the gospel is to be preached as a witness to all the world."

All of these doctrines, with the exception of item 11 (regarding the premillennial return of Christ), are widely held amongst conservative or evangelical Protestants. (Different Protestant groups hold varying views on the millennium.)

In addition to holding many standard Protestant positions, the SDAs have embraced the Three Angels' Messages, which are associated with a number of doctrinal Pillars. As a result of this interpretation of Revelations, many modern Protestant church denominations accept the end-times doctrine of a pre-millennial and literal Second Coming of Christ, as opposed to the belief in a 'thousand years of peace of prosperity' taught from the early 19th century onwards.

== Ellen White on the Pillars ==
Ellen White called it a "solid, immovable platform," and the principal "pillars" that support the platform, and the Three Angels' Messages that serve the dual functions of supporting the platform (as do the "pillars") and providing entry to it.

Ellen White explained that the "platform" of "truth" not merely truth as prepositional "theory," nor yet truth as "controversial subject," but rather the truth "as it is in Jesus" was the doctrinal construct of the newly developing church.

The pillar doctrines were cardinal teachings such as the second coming of Christ, conditional immortality ("soul sleep"), the seventh-day Sabbath (in the greater framework of the immutable Law of God), and the high priesthood of Jesus Christ in His heavenly sanctuary.

The three angels' messages of Revelation 14 not only support the total framework of "present truth," but also provide the key to unlock contemporary meaning and open the door of understanding....

Of all the pillar doctrines, the doctrine of Christ's high priesthood in the sanctuary was validated by the Holy Spirit "in a marked manner," more than any of the others. Also, it constitutes an important contribution of Seventh-day Adventists to the theology of Protestant Christendom, "the very message that has made us a separate people, and has given character and power to our work."

== Founders Theological Contributions to the Pillars ==
Joseph Bates first articulated together some of the basic doctrines of early Seventh-day Adventism.

Joseph Bates published his first booklet Seventh Day Sabbath, A Perpetual Sign in 1846. Bates shared the Sabbath with Hiram Edson, Crosier, and others who accepted the Sabbath through Joseph Bates’ presentations from his tract and also connected the Sabbath to the sanctuary message. Then in his second edition published in January 1847 he presented “additional light” in the idea that the Sabbath had eschatological importance because of Jesus’ end-time work in heaven.

Using Revelation 11:19 and Revelation 14:12 he argued that the Sabbath had eschatological significance and contemporary urgency. He showed that Jesus was in the heavenly temple with the Ark of the Covenant containing the Ten Commandments with emphasis on God’s people are described as keeping the commandments and the Sabbath which has special end-time significance. Bates also linked the heavenly temple of Revelation 11:19 to the Most Holy Place of the heavenly sanctuary along with the heavenly ministry of Christ, and the Second Advent into a theological package tied especially to Revelation. To this list of agreed doctrines among the few Adventists who formed the nucleus of what would become Seventh-day Adventism, can also be added the non-immortality of the soul.

Ellen White wrote the following of James White, Hiram Edson, and others. "Many of our people do not realize how firmly the foundation of our faith has been laid. My husband, Elder Joseph Bates, Father Pierce, Elder Edson, and others who were keen, noble, and true, were among those who, after the passing of the time in 1844, searched for the truth as for hidden treasure. I met with them, and we studied and prayed earnestly. Often we remained together until late at night, and sometimes through the entire night, praying for light and studying the word. Again and again these brethren came together to study the Bible, in order that they might know its meaning, and be prepared to teach it with power. When they came to the point in their study where they said, "We can do nothing more," the Spirit of the Lord would come upon me, I would be taken off in vision, and a clear explanation of the passages we had been studying would be given me, with instruction as to how we were to labor and teach effectively. Thus light was given that helped us to understand the scriptures in regard to Christ, His mission, and His priesthood. A line of truth extending from that time to the time when we shall enter the city of God, was made plain to me, and I gave to others the instruction that the Lord had given me.

"During this whole time I could not understand the reasoning of the brethren. My mind was locked, as it were, and I could not comprehend the meaning of the scriptures we were studying. This was one of the greatest sorrows of my life. I was in this condition of mind until all the principal points of our faith were made clear to our minds, in harmony with the word of God. The brethren knew that when not in vision, I could not understand these matters, and they accepted as light direct from heaven the revelations given. For two or three years my mind continued to be locked to an understanding of the Scriptures.

=== Sabbath Conferences ===
The Sabbath Conferences were series of over twenty meetings held between April, 1848, and December, 1850 in which further development of the basic doctrines of early Seventh-day Adventism were articulated and brought together. They meetings brought together many of the early Adventist founders and they went over the doctrines of Sabbatarian Adventists on the law of God (2SG 93), the Millennium, the 144,000m and the 2300 day-year prophecy ending in 1844. These meetings brought general agreement on eight doctrines: "An imminent, personal, premillennial Second Advent. The two-apartment High-Priestly ministry of Christ in the heavenly sanctuary, whose cleansing had commenced in 1844. The seventh-day Sabbath is biblical and binding upon Christians. The duty to proclaim the Three Angels' Messages of Rev. 14. Conditional immortality: death is a dreamless sleep. The timing of the Seven Last Plagues (after the Close of Probation). The final, complete, annihilation of the wicked at the close of the millennium. God's special supernatural enlightenment of Ellen G. White."

== See also ==
- Seventh-day Adventist Church
- Seventh-day Adventist theology
- Seventh-day Adventist eschatology
- History of the Seventh-day Adventist Church
- 28 fundamental beliefs
- Questions on Doctrine
- Biblical Research Institute
- Ellen G. White
- Teachings of Ellen White#End times
- Inspiration of Ellen White
- Prophecy in the Seventh-day Adventist Church
- Investigative judgment
- Sabbath in Seventh-day Adventism
