= 28 Fundamental Beliefs =

Core beliefs of the Seventh-day Adventist Church

The 28 fundamental beliefs are the core beliefs of Seventh-day Adventist theology. Adventists are opposed to the formulation of creeds, so the 28 fundamental beliefs are considered descriptors, not prescriptors; that is, that they describe the official position of the church but are not criteria for membership. These beliefs were originally known as the 27 fundamental beliefs when adopted by the church's General Conference in 1980. An additional belief (number 11) was added in 2005. The Seventh-day Adventist Bible Commentary is a significant expression of Adventist theological thought.

They may be grouped into the doctrines of God, humanity, salvation, the church, Christian life, and the restoration.

== History ==
Adventists have historically been reluctant to formalize a creed. In the October 8, 1861 Review and Herald, J. N. Loughborough wrote:

The first step of apostasy is to get up a creed, telling us what we shall believe. The second is, to make that creed a test of fellowship. The third is to try members by that creed. The fourth to denounce as heretics those who do not believe that creed. And fifth, to commence persecution against such.

Several summaries of Adventist theology have been presented at various times.

- In 1872 a pamphlet was produced presenting twenty-five Fundamental Principles not to "secure uniformity" but "to meet inquiries" and "to correct false statements."
- In 1931 a list of 22 Fundamental Beliefs was produced and published in the Adventist Yearbook, and subsequently in the Adventist Church Manual.
- In 1980, the 27 Fundamentals were instituted by the denomination's General Conference. Fritz Guy was the secretary of the original committee which produced the 27 Fundamentals. They were discussed and adopted at the 1980 General Conference Session. Ron Graybill wrote the preamble. They are expanded upon in the book Seventh-day Adventists Believe: A Biblical Exposition of 27 Fundamental Doctrines. This elaboration does not constitute the "official" position of the church.
- In 2005 another belief was inserted, fundamental belief number 11 "Growing in Christ", in response to the requests of Adventists in developing nations for a statement on spiritual warfare. It was voted in at the 2005 Adventist General Conference Session held in St. Louis, Missouri, yielding the current total of 28.

== Preamble ==
The preamble to the 28 Fundamentals states that Adventists accept the Bible as their only creed, and that revision of the statements may be expected during the church General Conference Session:

Seventh-day Adventists accept the Bible as their only creed and hold certain fundamental beliefs to be the teaching of the Holy Scriptures. These beliefs, as set forth here, constitute the church's understanding and expression of the teaching of Scripture. Revision of these statements may be expected at a General Conference Session when the church is led by the Holy Spirit to a fuller understanding of Bible truth or finds better language in which to express the teachings of God's Holy Word.

== Theological beliefs ==
=== Doctrines of God ===
1. Holy Scriptures

"The Holy Scriptures are the infallible revelation of [God's] will." Adventist theologians generally reject the "verbal inspiration" position on Scripture held by many conservative evangelical Christians. They believe instead that God inspired the thoughts of the biblical authors, and that the authors then expressed these thoughts in their own words. This view is popularly known as "thought inspiration", and most Adventist members hold to that view. According to Ed Christian, former JATS editor, "few if any ATS members believe in verbal inerrancy".
Adventists generally reject higher critical approaches to Scripture. The 1986 statement Methods of Bible Study, urges Adventist Bible students to avoid relying on the use of the presuppositions and the resultant deductions associated with the historical-critical method.

2. Trinity

The Godhead (Trinity) consists of the Father, the Lord Jesus Christ, and the Holy Spirit.

3. Father

God, the Father, is a personal and spiritual Being, who is omnipotent, omnipresent, omniscient. He is infinite in wisdom and love.

4. Son

Jesus Christ, is God in verity. He is of the same nature and essence as the Father. In addition, he took upon Himself human nature, living as a righteous man on earth, dying for the sins of mankind, raised from the dead and ascended to heaven where he makes intercession for mankind.

5. Holy Spirit

=== The doctrines of humanity ===
6. Creation

The Seventh-day Adventist doctrine of creationism is based on believing that the opening chapters of Genesis should be interpreted as literal history. Adventist belief holds that all Earthly life originated during a six-day period some 6000 years ago, and a global flood destroyed all land based animals and humans except for those saved on Noah's Ark. Adventists oppose theories which propose interpreting the days of creation symbolically. Although Adventists hold that creation week was a recent event, they believe the Bible speaks of other worlds populated by intelligent beings elsewhere in the universe, which pre-existed the Earth's creation week. Instead of being The Word's first creation, the Earth was most likely His last one. The sons of God of Job 1:6–12 are the Adams of unfallen worlds meeting in God's presence somewhere in the universe. Other inhabited planets are located in the vastness of space—well beyond the reach of space probes from our sin-polluted solar system, quarantined due to the infection of sin.
Adventists believe that inorganic matter was created prior to the creation week and was altered into its present form during the creation week. Therefore, the computed radiometric dates of standard geology are irrelevant to dating the creation of life on Earth. Since radiometric dating, says Webster, is an "interpretive science", he believes that for the Christian scientist “it would seem logical, almost compelling, to seriously consider” the Biblical account “for determining the time of Creation."

7. Nature of Humanity

=== The doctrines of salvation ===
8. The Great Controversy

9. The Life, Death, and Resurrection of Christ

10. The Experience of Salvation

11. Growing in Christ

=== The doctrines of the church ===
12. The Church

13. The Remnant and Its Mission

14. Unity in the Body of Christ

15. Baptism

16. The Lord's Supper

17. Spiritual Gifts and Ministries

18. The Spirit of Prophecy

=== The doctrines of Christian living ===
19. The Law of God

20. The Sabbath

21. Stewardship

22. Christian Behavior

23. Marriage and the Family

=== The doctrines of the restoration ===
24. Christ's Ministry in the Heavenly Sanctuary

25. The Second Coming of Christ

26. Death and Resurrection

27. The Millennium and the End of Sin

28. The New Earth

== See also ==
- History of the Seventh-day Adventist Church
- The Pillars of Adventism
- Seventh-day Adventist theology

== Sources ==
- General Conference of Seventh-day Adventists, Ministerial Association (2005). Seventh-day Adventists Believe (2nd ed.). Pacific Press Publishing Association.
- Numbers, Ron (2006). The Creationists.
