= Last Generation Theology =

Religious belief regarding moral perfection

Last Generation Theology (LGT) or "final generation" theology is a religious belief regarding moral perfection achieved by sanctified people in the last generation before the Second Coming of Jesus. It was a concept that had its origins in the beliefs and teachings of Seventh-day Adventist Church pioneers, and there are verses in scripture in texts such as 2 Corinthians 7:1, Matthew 5:48, and many others. Seventh-day Adventists hold that there will be an end-time remnant of believers who are faithful to God, which will be manifest shortly prior to the second coming of Jesus, as suggested by the 144,000 Saints described in the Book of Revelation of the New Testament.

Some claim LGT is related to "historic Adventism", but as one supporter claims, it differs in that it forms an extension or development of "historic" or mainstream Adventist beliefs, or takes them to their logical conclusion. It has similarities to the teachings of John Wesley, in his book A Plain Account of Christian Perfection of sanctification by grace.

Seventh-day Adventists teach that Jesus Christ was not only the Substitute but also the Example for man, and that Christians, through the process of sanctification overcome sin, and have the character of Christ perfectly reproduced in them through the Holy Spirit. The "final generation" believers hold that God's people will cease from committing sinful acts before the "close of probation," and before the "time of trouble" (Daniel 12:1; Jeremiah 30:7; Isaiah 26:20) just prior to the Second Coming of Jesus Christ. Most also believe that the close of human probation has been delayed by human sin and unbelief in the "Laodicean church," (a cipher for the SDA Church) but can be accelerated through their consistent living of holy lives (consistent obedience to the Ten Commandments by the enabling power of God, through the power of the Holy Spirit) so Christ can come.

Seventh-day Adventists teach that, at the end of time, there will be a Christian remnant who are faithful to God in keeping all of His ten commandments, (which includes resting on the seventh day of the week [Saturday]), and who are progressively sanctified and then sealed as "holy" and "righteous" before the Second Advent of Christ. Last Generation Theology builds on this belief, teaching that it is possible for this "last generation" of Christian believers to overcome sin like Christ and achieve a state of perfection. This is a key teaching for those who adhere to "historic Adventism." This achievement of perfection is believed to have major eschatological implications, by finally settling major questions in the Great Controversy about the character of God and His law. Proponents of Last Generation Theology see it, not as a new belief system, but as forming an extension or development of Seventh-day Adventist beliefs on the remnant, or taking them to their logical conclusion.

== Doctrine ==
The Last Generation Theology understanding is best seen in light of the doctrinal development of the Seventh-day Adventist Church. Seventh-day Adventists have had four generally recognized statements of belief, prepared in 1872, 1931, 1980, and 2005. The 1872 and 1931 statements of belief were prepared for use at the informational level, for those outside the movement who desired to understand what Seventh-day Adventists stood for.

Adventism is rooted in Reformationism and Restorationism, combining elements from Lutheran, Anabaptist and Methodist or Wesleyan/Arminian branches of Protestantism. Adventist theology tends to the Wesleyan/Arminian view of emphasis on sanctification and the possibility of moral perfection in this life. Adventists believe that the events at the end time demonstrate that God in His mercy has provided for a plan of salvation which comes when Christ comes to take His saints to heaven at the Second Coming, and judgement comes on the wicked. In the closing days, God simply recognizes the free and final decision that His created beings have made, and He allows for justice for those who follow the world, and gives eternal life to those who at the end are sealed of God.

Seventh-day Adventists teach that Jesus Christ was not only the Substitute but also the Example for man, and that Christians through the process of sanctification, the character of Christ is perfectly reproduced in them through the transformation power of the Holy Spirit allowing overcoming sin. Adventists teach that those that overcome sin at the end time will be part of the Remnant that are sealed, but it is at the time of the Second Coming of Christ that inbred sin and the scars of sin, and the danger of falling back into sin will be removed. Adventists hold that when a person receives Jesus Christ as their personal Saviour, the imputed righteousness of Christ bestows full forgiveness for all our transgressions in our past life. Then the imparted righteousness of Christ living in their renewed heart, if fully appropriated by faith, will deliver the believer from the dominion of inbred sin and thus keep them from the acts of sin.

Seventh-day Adventists hold that Christ is not only our example but shows mankind the path to overcome sin, and to manifest Christ's perfect and righteous character. They hold to the 28 Fundamental Beliefs of Seventh-day Adventists which in #10 states 'we are given the power to live a holy life' and right before that 'we are born again and sanctified' through the Holy Spirit.

Proponents of Last Generation Theology believe that end time saints will overcome and cease from sin before the close of probation and before the time of trouble just prior to the Second Coming of Jesus Christ. A few of proponents of Last Generation Theology teach that the close of human probation has been delayed by sin and unbelief in the Laodicean church, but can be hastened through their consistent living of holy lives (consistent obedience to the Ten Commandments by the enabling power of GOD through the power of the Holy Spirit).

=== The Great Controversy ===
Seventh-day Adventists consider The Great Controversy to be one of Ellen White's important works, and in addition to the major Adventist publishing houses, the book has also been printed and distributed by various independent initiatives, sometimes under other titles. The Great Controversy has the following of the perfection of those who stand at the end while Christ still intercedes in the Most Holy Place:

"The "time of trouble, such as never was," is soon to open upon us; and we shall need an experience which we do not now possess and which many are too indolent to obtain. It is often the case that trouble is greater in anticipation than in reality; but this is not true of the crisis before us. The most vivid presentation cannot reach the magnitude of the ordeal. In that time of trial, every soul must stand for himself before God. "Though Noah, Daniel, and Job" were in the land, "as I live, saith the Lord God, they shall deliver neither son nor daughter; they shall but deliver their own souls by their righteousness." Now, while our great High Priest is making the atonement for us, we should seek to become perfect in Christ. Not even by a thought could our Saviour be brought to yield to the power of temptation. . . . This is the condition in which those must be found who shall stand in the time of trouble" (GC 622–623).

When the third angel's message closes, mercy no longer pleads for the guilty inhabitants of the earth. The people of God have accomplished their work. They have received "the latter rain," "the refreshing from the presence of the Lord," and they are prepared for the trying hour before them. Angels are hastening to and fro in heaven. An angel returning from the earth announces that his work is done; the final test has been brought upon the world, and all who have proved themselves loyal to the divine precepts have received "the seal of the living God." Then Jesus ceases His intercession in the sanctuary above. He lifts His hands and with a loud voice says, "It is done;" and all the angelic host lay off their crowns as He makes the solemn announcement: "He that is unjust, let him be unjust still: and he which is filthy, let him be filthy still: and he that is righteous, let him be righteous still: and he that is holy, let him be holy still." (GC 613) The urgency for attaining perfection comes from the knowledge that the remnant must live perfectly during the time of trouble at the end to prove to the universe that fallen human beings can keep the law of God. Ellen White states, "When He leaves the sanctuary, darkness covers the inhabitants of the earth. In that fearful time the righteous must live in the sight of a holy God without an intercessor." (GC 614).

And explains this is necessary because the "earthliness" of the remnant must be cleansed that the image of Christ may be perfectly reflected: "God’s love for His children during the period of their severest trial is as strong and tender as in the days of their sunniest prosperity; but it is needful for them to be placed in the furnace of fire; their earthliness must be consumed, that the image of Christ may be perfectly reflected."(GC 621).

And emphasizes that attaining God's blessing will mean denying self: "Those who are unwilling to deny self, to agonize before God, to pray long and earnestly for His blessing, will not obtain it. Wrestling with God–how few know what it is!" (GC 621).

Ellen White in her writings does not link perfection to something that happens from the believer, but with what God does for the believer through Christ, and those who try to trust in their own righteousness cannot understand how it comes through Christ.

=== The Remnant ===
Adventists believe the term 'remnant' as found in Revelation 12:17 (Christians who "keep the commandments of God and have the testimony of Jesus") an appropriate designation of themselves in their work of proclaiming the gospel of Jesus to the world, and inviting people to obey each of the Ten Commandments of the moral law as a loving response to God's work for them in Jesus Christ. Hence, the remnant is an identifiable and visible Christian movement at the end time who are faithful to God, which will be manifest shortly prior to the second coming of Jesus and are sealed.

Ellen White states,

“Now is the time to prepare. The seal of God will never be placed upon the forehead of an impure man or woman. It will never be placed upon the forehead of the ambitious, world-loving man or woman. It will never be placed upon the forehead of men or women of false tongues or deceitful hearts. All who receive the seal must be without spot before God -- candidates for heaven..”

=== 144,000 ===
Ellen White counseled the church that the identity of the 144,000 was not something that should allow division. Ellen White wrote: “It is not His [God’s] will that they shall get into controversy over questions which will not help them spiritually, such as, Who is to compose the hundred and forty-four thousand? This those who are the elect of God will in a short time know without question.”

Ellen White in The Great Controversy page 623, gives descriptions of those who stand at the end while Christ still intercedes in the Most Holy Place:

“Now, while our great High Priest is making the atonement for us, we should seek to become perfect in Christ. Not even by a thought could our Saviour be brought to yield to the power of temptation. Satan finds in human hearts some point where he can gain a foothold; some sinful desire is cherished, by means of which his temptations assert their power. But Christ declared of Himself: "The prince of this world cometh, and hath nothing in Me." John 14:30. Satan could find nothing in the Son of God that would enable him to gain the victory. He had kept His Father's commandments, and there was no sin in Him that Satan could use to his advantage. This is the condition in which those must be found who shall stand in the time of trouble. “

=== Christology - The human nature of Jesus Christ ===
Seventh-day Adventists teach, as well as some Last Generation Theology proponents such as Larry Kirkpatrick covering the nature of Christ, that Jesus Christ was born with Adam's fallen nature that has been passed on to all of humanity but without the propensity to sin. Such a belief is based on the following texts,

"For what the law could not do in that it was weak through the flesh, God did by sending His own Son in the likeness of sinful flesh, on account of sin: He condemned sin in the flesh" Romans 8:3 (NKJV)

"For we do not have a High Priest who cannot sympathize with our weaknesses, but was in all points tempted as we are, yet without sin." Hebrews 4:15 (NKJV)

"...concerning his Son (Jesus), who was descended from David according to the flesh..." Romans 1:3 (ESV)

"Therefore, in all things He had to be made like His brethren, that He might be a merciful and faithful High Priest in things pertaining to God, to make propitiation for the sins of the people." Hebrews 2:17 NKJV

Despite this, he managed to resist temptation both from within and without, and lived a perfectly obedient life. Jesus is therefore set forth as the supreme Example in whose footsteps Christians must follow. The fact that he overcame sin completely, despite having no advantage over other human beings, demonstrates that we too can live a life of complete obedience by trusting in him. Ellen White states,

"Notwithstanding that the sins of a guilty world were laid upon Christ, notwithstanding the humiliation of taking upon Himself our fallen nature, the voice from heaven declared Him to be the Son of the Eternal"

— Ellen White, The Desire of Ages, p. 112.

"Jesus revealed no qualities, and exercised no powers, that men may not have through faith in Him. His perfect humanity is that which all His followers may possess, if they will be in subjection to God as He was."

— Ellen White, Desire of Ages, 664.

"Since the fall of Adam, men in every age have excused themselves for sinning, charging God with their sin, saying that they could not keep his commandments. This is the insinuation Satan cast at God in heaven. But the plea, 'I cannot keep the commandments,' need never be presented to God, for before Him stands the Saviour, the marks of the crucifixion upon His body, a living witness that the law can be kept. It is not that men cannot keep the law, but they will not....in His human nature, Christ rendered perfect obedience to the law of God, thus proving to all that this law can be kept."

— Ellen White, Review and Herald, vol. 4, p. 303, May 28, 1901.

"Perfection of character is a lifelong work, unattainable by those who are not willing to strive for it in God's appointed way, by slow and toilsome steps. We cannot afford to make any mistake in this matter, but we want day by day to be growing up into Christ, our living Head."

— Ellen White, Testimonies for the Church, vol. 5, p. 500.

"The Son of God was assaulted at every step by the powers of darkness. After his baptism he was driven of the Spirit into the wilderness, and suffered temptation for forty days. Letters have been coming in to me, affirming that Christ could not have had the same nature as man, for if he had, he would have fallen under similar temptations. If he did not have man's nature, he could not be our example. If he was not a partaker of our nature, he could not have been tempted as man has been. If it were not possible for him to yield to temptation, he could not be our helper. It was a solemn reality that Christ came to fight the battles as man, in man's behalf. His temptation and victory tell us that humanity must copy the Pattern; man must become a partaker of the divine nature.... Those who would overcome must put to the tax every power of their being. They must agonize on their knees before God for divine power. Christ came to be our example, and to make known to us that we may be partakers of the divine nature [2 Peter 1:4-12]. How?--By having escaped the corruptions that are in the world through lust...Christ, by his own example, made it evident that man may stand in integrity. Men may have a power to resist evil--a power that neither earth, nor death, nor hell can master; a power that will place them where they may overcome as Christ overcame. Divinity and humanity may be combined in them."

— Ellen White, Review and Herald, vol. 2, p. 367.

"Let none, then, regard their defects as incurable. God will give faith and grace to overcome them." The Great Controversy, p. 489.

Progressive Adventists tend to disagree strongly with the belief that Christ was our example as well as substitute and also of "eschatological perfectionism," the teaching that a final generation of believers must achieve a state of complete sinlessness (or Christlikeness) in the final period just before the second coming of Jesus when the saints are sealed.

=== Original Sin ===
Adventist as well as Last Generation Theology does not believe in "original sin" or "ancestral sin", but holds to the Adventist doctrinal view, that while damaged by Adam's fall, sin occurs in the actual sins that a person commits. Adventist hold that sin is the transgression of the law of God in thought, word, or deed and teach that the word "sin" is also used to denote the sinful nature that every person inherits at birth as a consequence of Adam's disobedience.

They look at text from scripture: "Behold, I was shapen in iniquity; and in sin did my mother conceive me" (Ps. 51:5), and hold to the belief that the word "sin" given here does not mean any transgression of the law. There was no act of transgression when David was conceived by his mother in holy wedlock. Sin in this case means inbred sin. It refers to the sinful nature with which every person is born. Thus sin is set forth in a twofold aspect. It is a transgression of the law in thought, word, or action. Or it may refer to inbred sin, or the sinful flesh.

Seventh-day Adventists teach and have historically preached a doctrine of inherited weakness, but not a doctrine of inherited guilt. Adventists believe that humans are sinful primarily due to the fall of Adam, but they do not accept the Augustinian/Calvinistic understanding of original sin, taught in terms of original guilt. According to Augustine and Calvin, humanity inherits not only Adam's depraved nature but also the actual guilt of his transgression, and Adventists look more toward the Wesleyan model.

In part, the Adventist position on original sin reads:

"The nature of the penalty for original sin, i.e., Adam's sin, is to be seen as literal, physical, temporal, or actual death – the opposite of life, i.e., the cessation of being. By no stretch of the scriptural facts can death be spiritualised as depravity. God did not punish Adam by making him a sinner. That was Adam’s own doing. All die the first death because of Adam’s sin regardless of their moral character – children included."

Early Adventists (such as George Storrs, Ellen White and Uriah Smith) tended to de-emphasise the corrupt nature inherited from Adam, while stressing the importance of actual, personal sins committed by the individual. Adventism looks at the "sinful nature" in terms of physical mortality rather than moral depravity as those who believe in original sin. Traditionally, Adventists look at sin in terms of willful transgressions. They base their belief on texts such as "Whosoever committeth sin transgresseth also the law: for sin is the transgression of the law." (1 John 3:4)

Adventist Joe Crews states...

There is a very important difference between the inclination to sin and the guilt of sin, and it is that small degree of difference that has triggered a series of other doctrinal errors. Said the prophet, "The son shall not bear the iniquity of the father, neither shall the father bear the iniquity of the son" (Ezekiel 18:20).

— Joe Crews, Christ's Human Nature

Seventh-day Adventists have historically preached a doctrine of inherited weakness, but not a doctrine of inherited guilt. Adventists believe that humans are sinful primarily due to the fall of Adam, but they do not accept the Augustinian/Calvinistic understanding of original sin, taught in terms of original guilt. According to Augustine and Calvin, humanity inherits not only Adam's depraved nature but also the actual guilt of his transgression, and Adventists look more toward the Wesleyan model.

Adventists hold to the belief that sin is wilful transgression of God's law. Sin is a choice. They base their belief on scripture such as "Whosoever committeth sin transgresseth also the law: for sin is the transgression of the law." (1 John 3:4)

=== Victory Over Sin ===
Seventh-Day Adventist hold that we will have victory over sin, and that we must be a sanctified individual before we are taken to heaven and quote the following verse. “Be ye therefore perfect, even as your Father which is in heaven is perfect.” Matthew 5:48. Others point out that the perfection spoke of this verse is not of personal piety but equanimity or disinterested benevolence, just as the Father permits the rain to fall, or sun to shine, on "both the just and unjust". Matt 5:48

Last Generation Theology in accord with mainstream Seventh-Day Adventist belief holds that true followers of Christ will need to cease from sin before the second coming of Christ, and look to text such as Revelation 2:11:

He that hath an ear, let him hear what the Spirit saith unto the churches; He that overcometh shall not be hurt of the second death. Revelation 2:11

Seventh-day Adventists believe that at the close of probation the righteous saints will be sealed and be held righteous from texts such as Revelation 22:11:

He that is unjust, let him be unjust still: and he which is filthy, let him be filthy still: and he that is righteous, let him be righteous still: and he that is holy, let him be holy still. Revelation 22:11

The Adventist Church has, through the decades of the past, taken the position that those who overcome their sins will have them blotted out of the books of record in the judgment. The saints who are alive at the close of probation will be sealed as "holy" and "righteous." Thus they will be kept from sin when there is no intercessor when Christ leaves heaven to come to earth and the books of judgment have been finalized. Then at the Second Coming the mortal body with its sinful flesh will be changed into an immortal body with sinless flesh.

However, LGT Adventists tend to focus on the sanctified life as the power which will enable them to achieve this feat, while Adventism traditionally holds that it is in looking to the imputed righteousness of Christ and uplifting justification by faith in the imputed merits of Christ that will enable one to stand spotless upon that day. In regard to preparation for the time of trouble, Ellen White says,

"The time of test is just upon us, for the loud cry of the third angel has already begun in the revelation of the righteousness of Christ, the sin-pardoning Redeemer. This is the beginning of the light of the angel whose glory shall fill the whole earth. If you would stand through the time of trouble, you must know Christ and appropriate the gift of His righteousness, which He imputes to the repentant sinner."

The Seventh-day Adventist Church teaches and Adventists believe that one can achieve victory over sin through the power of Christ and not of one's own power. They therefore believe that victory over sin is possible in this lifetime. It bases its belief on a wide range of Bible texts such as...

I can do all things through Christ who strengthens me. ~ Philippians 4:13

Whoever commits sin also commits lawlessness, and sin is lawlessness. And you know that He was manifested to take away our sins, and in Him there is no sin. Whoever abides in Him does not sin. Whoever sins has neither seen Him nor known Him. Little children, let no one deceive you. He who practices righteousness is righteous, just as He is righteous. He who sins is of the devil, for the devil has sinned from the beginning. For this purpose the Son of God was manifested, that He might destroy the works of the devil. Whoever has been born of God does not sin, for His seed remains in him; and he cannot sin, because he has been born of God. ~ 1 John 3:4-9

Therefore, if anyone is in Christ, he is a new creation; old things have passed away; behold, all things have become new. ~ 2 Corinthians 5:17

If we confess our sins, He is faithful and just to forgive us our sins and to cleanse us from all unrighteousness. ~ 1 John 1:9

Now to Him (Jesus) who is able to keep you from stumbling, and to present you faultless before the presence of His glory with exceeding joy, ~ Jude 1:24

Therefore you shall be perfect, just as your Father in heaven is perfect. ~ Matthew 5:48

For I am the LORD who brings you up out of the land of Egypt, to be your God. You shall therefore be holy, for I am holy. ~ Leviticus 11:45

Here is the patience of the saints; here are those who keep the commandments of God and the faith of Jesus. ~ Revelation 14:12

Ellen G. White, considered to be a woman inspired by God, wrote:

Men and women frame many excuses for their proneness to sin. Sin is represented as a necessity, an evil that cannot be overcome. But sin is not a necessity. Christ lived in this world from infancy to manhood, and during that time He met and resisted all the temptations by which man is beset. He is a perfect pattern of childhood, of youth, of manhood. The life of Christ has shown what humanity can do by being partaker of the divine nature. All that Christ received from God we too may have. Then ask and receive… Let your life be knit by hidden links to the life of Jesus. - Faith I Live By, pg. 219

=== Salvation ===
While Ellen White speaks of the sanctification of Christ's church and its members and Adventist theology tends to the Wesleyan/Arminian view of emphasis on sanctification, it is claimed that Last Generation Theology Adventists tend to place a greater emphasis on sanctification than just justification, believing that both are necessary for salvation; this view is often described as "righteousness by faith". Adventist theologian Richard Rice, speaking on views of salvation in Adventism says, "the Reformers themselves held that justification and sanctification are inseparable". Adventists look to text in scripture such as...

Do you not know that the unrighteous will not inherit the kingdom of God? Do not be deceived. Neither fornicators, nor idolaters, nor adulterers, nor homosexuals, nor sodomites, nor thieves, nor covetous, nor drunkards, nor revilers, nor extortioners will inherit the kingdom of God. And such were some of you. But you were washed, but you were sanctified, but you were justified in the name of the Lord Jesus and by the Spirit of our God. ~ 1 Corinthians 6:9-11

Now the works of the flesh are evident, which are: adultery, fornication, uncleanness, lewdness, idolatry, sorcery, hatred, contentions, jealousies, outbursts of wrath, selfish ambitions, dissensions, heresies, 21 envy, murders, drunkenness, revelries, and the like; of which I tell you beforehand, just as I also told you in time past, that those who practice such things will not inherit the kingdom of God. But the fruit of the Spirit is love, joy, peace, longsuffering, kindness, goodness, faithfulness, gentleness, self-control. Against such there is no law. 24 And those who are Christ's have crucified the flesh with its passions and desires. ~ Galatians 5:19-24

=== Atonement ===
The Seventh-day Adventist church teaches that there is a sanctuary in heaven which was foreshadowed by the Mosaic tabernacle, according to their interpretation of the Epistle to the Hebrews chapters 8 and 9. After his death, resurrection and ascension, Jesus Christ entered the heavenly sanctuary as the great High Priest, "making available to believers the benefits of His atoning sacrifice" (Fundamental Belief no. 24). Adventists hold that Christ ministered his blood in the first section of the sanctuary (the holy place) until October 1844; after that time he entered the second section of the sanctuary (the Most Holy Place, or Holy of Holies) in fulfillment of the Day of Atonement.

Adventists therefore believe that Christ's work of atonement encompasses both his death on the Cross and his ministration in the heavenly sanctuary.

Seventh-day Adventists have always believed in a complete atonement that is not completed.

— W. G. C. Murdock, SDA Theological Seminary Dean, 1980, Discussion, General Conference Session, Dallas

Thus Adventist doctrine defines the atonement in terms of God's continuing work as well as payment of the penalty for sin at the cross. The work of Christ in the heavenly sanctuary is regarded as a continuation of the work of atonement begun on the cross, rather than the application of the benefits of an already completed atonement. For example, it is written...

Who shall bring a charge against God's elect? It is God who justifies. Who is he who condemns? It is Christ who died, and furthermore is also risen, who is even at the right hand of God, who also makes intercession for us. ~ Romans 8:33-34

Seventh-day Adventists teach and emphasize the two parts to the atonement and refer to his mediatorial work in heaven as an "atoning ministry" (as in Fundamental Belief no. 24).

The completion of this ministry by Christ in the heavenly sanctuary will mark the close of human probation before the Second Advent.

Last Generation Theology emphasizes that this ministration of Christ in the Most Holy Place of the sanctuary, is a continuation of His work of "atonement" in cleansing the characters of His people from sin. Last Generation Theology holds that this third and final phase of atonement completes the unfinished atonement made by Christ on the cross, a view that was promoted as early as the 1860s by Joseph Waggoner. Most Seventh-day Adventists, by contrast, understand Christ's heavenly ministration to be an application of His complete work of atonement on the cross.

=== Hastening Eschatology ===
One of the general principles of Last Generation Theology which is not written in the church Fundament Beliefs, is a belief that believers can affect the coming of Christ. Apostle Peter in 2 Peter chapter 3 writes saints should "hasten" the coming of Christ and Christ is "not willing that any should perish, but that all should come to repentance". It is claimed that LGT adherents hold that the ultimate defeat of Satan would only be finally effected through the sinlessly perfected remnant of the "Last Generation" of "sealed" saints.

Andreasen held that such a final victory would be achieved only through the grace which would be imparted from the Christ, Who is ministering in the most holy place of the heavenly sanctuary. In other words, this faithful "Remnant" would develop sinless characters that would replicate the sinlessly perfect life which Christ had wrought out in the very same fallen, sinful nature in which the final generation will have to overcome. Thus Christ defeat of Satan is complete through the remnant's victory, in order to fully and finally vindicate God's demand for perfect obedience; and this end-time vindication of God will finally enable Christ to come and refer to Biblical texts such as 2 Peter 3 and Ellen White's statements in the book Christ's Object Lessons, i.e. page 69:

"'When the fruit is brought forth, immediately he putteth in the sickle, because the harvest is come.' Christ is waiting with longing desire for the manifestation of Himself in His church. When the character of Christ shall be perfectly reproduced in His people, then He will come to claim them as His own. It is the privilege of every Christian not only to look for but to hasten the coming of our Lord Jesus Christ, (2 Peter 3:12, margin). Were all who profess His name bearing fruit to His glory, how quickly the whole world would be sown with the seed of the gospel. Quickly the last great harvest would be ripened, and Christ would come to gather the precious grain."

== History ==
=== Early Pioneers ===
Millerite Adventists saw the Daniel 8:14 cleansing of the sanctuary as meeting fulfillment on two levels: cleansing the church from sin, and cleansing the earth by fire. After 1844, the early Adventists continued to maintain the concept of a dual cleansing, but now it no longer included the cleansing of the earth. Instead, the cleansing pertained to the heavenly sanctuary and the church. Adventist sanctuary doctrine gives a twofold meaning to the blood of the sacrifice. The SDA understanding of Old Testament theology in reference to the "daily" sacrifice defiles the sanctuary, whilst the blood of the sacrifice, pertaining to the yearly Day of Atonement, cleanses the sanctuary. However, in the New Testament, the blood of the sacrifice in SDA sanctuary doctrine is depicted as Jesus Christ's blood which cleanses the sinner from all unrighteousness, yet also transfers sin to the Heavenly Sanctuary to defile the Most Holy Place.

From the very beginning, Seventh-day Adventists have held to the belief in overcoming sin, and all who will can be overcomers. Ellen White wrote much about the necessity of victory over sin, but did paint the picture of "last generation perfection" as clearly as subsequent authors. In particular, White does not claim that sinlessness or perfection is a requirement only of the last generation, but of every follower of Christ. Also, White does not make a clear connection between the perfection of the final generation, and the vindication of the character of God before the universe, as do Andreasen and subsequent authors.

The early Adventist pioneers held to the belief of overcoming sin and believed "that the final generation would become perfected, or sinless, men." Well-known theologians A. T. Jones and Ellet J. Waggoner were both key participants in the 1888 Minneapolis General Conference Session, a landmark event in the history of the Seventh-day Adventist Church. In addition to the message of righteousness by faith, A. T. Jones held that Christ was made "in all things" like unto us, or that He had the fallen nature of mankind after Adam. Because Christ overcame sin as our example, the perfection of character is the Christian goal. He also argued that there must be a moral and spiritual perfection of the believers before the end time. In the Consecrated Way, he wrote:

"Sanctification is the true keeping of all the commandments of God. In other words, this is to say that the will of God concerning man is that His will shall be perfectly fulfilled in man. His will is expressed in His law of ten commandments, which is "the whole duty of man." This law is perfect, and perfection of character is the perfect expression of this law in the life of the worshipper of God. By this law is the knowledge of sin. And all have sinned and have come short of the glory of God—have come short of this perfection of character....In His coming in the flesh—having been made in all things like unto us and having been tempted in all points like as we are—He has identified Himself with every human soul just where that soul is. And from the place where every human soul is, He has consecrated for that soul a new and living way through all the vicissitudes and experiences of a whole lifetime, and even through death and the tomb, into the holiest of all at the right hand of God for evermore....Perfection, perfection of character, is the Christian goal—perfection attained in human flesh in this world. Christ attained it in human flesh in this world and thus made and consecrated a way by which, in Him, every believer can attain it. He, having attained it, has become our great High Priest, by His priestly ministry in the true sanctuary to enable us to attain."

=== M. L. Andreasen ===
Andreasen has been recognized as the denomination's most influential theologian during the 1930s and 1940s. Andreasen held to the traditional Adventist belief, that Christ had taken a sinful human nature, just like Adam’s after the fall. But Andreasen believed the final atonement could be effected from the heavenly sanctuary through the sinlessly perfected characters of the embattled, last day saints on earth. This final atonement theology was most clearly set forth in the chapter entitled "The Last Generation" in his well-known book The Sanctuary Service (1937, 1947). In this book Andreasen presented his views regarding the atonement and related topics in the closing chapter, "The Final Generation".

Adventists consider the life and character of Christ as a perfect example that all must imitate. M. L. Andreasen felt the cleansing of the heavenly sanctuary, or investigative judgment also involve the cleansing of the lives of believers on earth. This belief in sinlessness arose particularly from M. L. Andreasen's interpretation of the investigative judgment doctrine, which he based on concepts found in The Great Controversy by Ellen G. White.

In 1957 the church published the major book 'Questions on Doctrine (QOD), after discussions with fundamentalist/evangelical Christian leaders. The book has been the most controversial ever in the history of the Adventist church. Its harshest critic was M. L. Andreasen, who urged church leaders not to publish QOD who felt it presented changes to the church's doctrinal position on the nature of Christ. The controversial parts were the book's view of Christology and the atonement. Proponents of LGT believe the book downplayed the concept that a last generation could, by the power of the gospel, be made holy, and stop sinning.

=== Robert Pierson ===
Robert Pierson served as a president of the General Conference from 1966 to 1979. He was known to advocate the principles of Last Generation Theology during his time. He was a driving force in the 1973 and 1974 Annual Council Appeals, which called on church members to "demonstrate that His way of life can truly be lived on earth". He authored 28 books. He wrote, "Today, we as God’s people need to devote more thoughtful, prayerful attention to the work being carried on in our behalf in the heavenly sanctuary. We are living in the antitypical Day of Atonement, and God expects much of those who compose His remnant church. "While the investigative judgment is going forward in heaven, while the sins of penitent believers are being removed from the sanctuary, there is to be a special work of purification, of putting away of sin, among God’s people upon earth". In the book Ransom & Reunion Through the Sanctuary, a special "work of purification," a special work "of putting away of sin," is brought vividly to our attention..God's last-generation people are to reveal the character of Jesus to the world. They will overcome as He overcame. They will be victorious living representatives of the Master. The enabling power to live this life, to achieve this character, comes from Jesus. Only through His imputed and imparted righteousness can we prevail.

Through the printed pages of the Review & Herald (now Adventist Review) and Ministry magazines, he appealed to the laity and leadership of the denomination to hold fast to teachings of the church reflected in the church's fundamental beliefs, including the doctrine of the work of Jesus Christ as High Priest in the heavenly sanctuary, and the concept of the true believers overcoming all their sins, with the aid of God, prior to their baptism with the power of the Holy Spirit ("the falling of the Latter Rain") to proclaim the Three Angels' Messages of Revelation 14 to the world, calling upon the people to take a stand for "the commandments of God (including the seventh-day Sabbath - Saturday) and the faith of Jesus". He wrote this theme in his papers and in his sermons, "Christ is waiting with longing desire for the manifestation of Himself in His church. When the character of Christ is perfectly reproduced in His people, then He will come to claim them as His own." [Christ's Object Lessons, page 69. Ellen G. White. 1900]

=== Herbert Douglass ===
Herbert Douglass was a prominent figure in the 1970s advocating Last Generation Theology, publishing articles in what is now the Adventist Review supporting LGT, along with editor Kenneth H. Wood. He has been a leading theologian within the Adventist church. A key contribution to LGT by Douglass was his articulation of what came to be known as "The Harvest Principle". Herbert E. Douglass developed essentially the very same concepts but independently of Andreasen. Douglass was writing his editorials in the Review in favor of the same belief, but he had never read Andreasen. Finally, after these editorials he read Andreasen's views and did find much commonality. But Douglass had developed his concepts, just as Andreasen had, via his careful study of Scripture and reading of the Ellen G. White writings.

A key contribution by Douglass was his articulation of what came to be known as The Harvest Principle. Pointing to Mark 4:26–29 and Rev 14:14–16, Douglass argued that God is waiting for a ripe harvest, and as soon as that harvest "is fully ripe", He will thrust in His sickle and reap the earth - the Second Coming of Christ will at last come to pass.

Douglass also promoted the Great Controversy theme (GCT) as the conceptual key, the organizing principle that leads to an understanding of humanity's greatest questions: How did life begin? Why good and evil, and how does one know the difference? What happens after death? Why suffering and death? The Great Controversy Theme provides the background for the development of evil – the story of Lucifer's (Satan's) rebellion against the government of God. The thrust of Satan's argument is that God cannot be trusted, that His law is severe and unfair, and thus the Lawgiver is unfair, severe, and arbitrary.

For Douglass, the Great Controversy Theme tied together the plan of redemption, Bible truth, Jesus’ entry into humanity, and His death upon the cross. It links Christ's death with the application of His power within believers. It states that God purposes to demonstrate through His end-time people what His grace can do, and describes how Satan's charges will be negated. According to this view, God has called a people to understand, live out, and present God's love during the climax of the great controversy.

=== Ted N. C. Wilson ===
Elder Ted N. C. Wilson, former General Conference President of Seventh-day Adventists, emphasizes the need for victory over sin before the close of probation and the last generation.

Elder Ted N. C. Wilson is a supporter of traditional Adventist beliefs such as those in the Great Controversy theme which has Last Generation Theology. He presented LGT principles in his first address to the 59th GC session in Atlanta on July 3, 2010, and in his Divine Worship message to the Generation of Youth for Christ (GYC) convention on January 1, 2011. p. 85. In President Ted N.C. Wilson's sermon at the 2014 Annual Council he stated, "Time on this Earth is short. Probation is closing soon. Preparation to see God face to face by repentance and forsaking of sin needs to be done now. The Great Controversy, page 425, explains that: “Those who are living upon the Earth when the intercession of Christ shall cease in the sanctuary above, are to stand in the sight of a holy God without a mediator. Their robes must be spotless, their characters must be purified from sin by the blood of sprinkling. Through the grace of God and their own diligent effort, they must be conquerors in the battle with evil.”

While Wilson does not explicitly endorse LGT, Kevin Paulson has pointed out his use of Ellen White's statement on Christ's Object Lesson, page 69, in his messages—that the Latter Rain prepares the "last generation". This statement by Ellen White is also a key quotation used by supporters of LGT.

=== Recent Supporters ===
==== Dennis Priebe ====
Dennis Priebe is a recent supporter of Last Generation Theology and has published Face-to-Face With the Real Gospel in 1986. Priebe also publishes articles on his website supporting Last Generation Theology.

==== Larry Kirkpatrick ====
Larry Kirkpatrick has been publishing on the internet since 1997. In 2005, Kirkpatrick's book, Cleanse and Close: Last Generation Theology in 14 Points packaged the concepts that had been developing since the mid 19th century, and identified them as Last Generation Theology.

==== Kevin Paulson ====
Kevin D. Paulson, Adventist evangelist and author, is a supporter of Last Generation Theology. Paulson also points out Elder Ted Wilson's use of key LGT phrases and quotations, signalling what he sees as a shift in the General Conference leadership in favor of LGT.

==== Other supporters ====
Other prominent supporters of Last Generation Theology include Carl Martin and Dwayne Lemon.

Recently, certain young people, have been promoters of this theology such as Diamond Garcia, Armin Kritzinger, and James Bowen (cohost of Heritage and Hope Ministires). Advocating that through Christ we can and will obtain total victory over sin.

== In relation to the larger church ==
Last Generation Theology and its significance among Seventh-day Adventist believers is attested by the wide range of Adventist leaders and pastors, scholars the publishing of books like QOD and Issues which are more mainstream, the counter-publishing of the 1973 and 1974 Appeals, and the persistent historical presence of its advocates in significant church positions (M. L. Andreasen, Robert H. Pierson, C. Mervyn Maxwell, Kenneth Wood, Herbert E. Douglass, Joe Crews of Amazing Facts and Doug Batchelor, Walter Veith of Amazing Discoveries, Dennis Priebe, J. R. Zurcher, Ted Wilson, etc.) point to a train of thought within the larger church.

The beliefs of a church are often defined on the basis of formally voted policy statements. However, this is but one element in the development of a meaningful understanding of the identity of a religious group. The historical-theological development of a group is also very meaningful in defining the beliefs of a Church. Last Generation Theology and the discussion surrounding it offers a window to contributory streams of thought that inform the identity of Seventh-day Adventism.

Scholars such as Frank M. Hasel, insist that the remnant theology formulated in the 19th century is central to Adventist identity, and Adventists today should hold fast to it. He quotes the SDA Encyclopedia: "Seventh-day Adventists are convinced that ‘they alone among the bodies of Christendom are giving this message [the three angels’ message of Revelation 14].’ Thus," says Hasel, Adventists believe "‘the term "remnant" to be an appropriate designation of themselves in their role as God's appointed witness to earth's last generation.’ Hence, the remnant is an identifiable and visible Christian movement." For Hasel, any construal of the remnant that fails to identify it the institutional, organized Adventist church "weakens the nature of the end-time remnant as described in the book of Revelation."

== Institutions ==
Organizations that actively promote Last Generation Theology include Larry Kirkpatrick's greatcontroversy.org and lastgenerationtheology.org.

Institutions which hold to mainstream Adventist beliefs, but advocate Last Generation Theology in their programming include Generation of Youth for Christ (GYC), Iona Missions, 3ABN, Amazing Discoveries, Secrets Unsealed, White Horse Media, Amazing Facts.

== Robert Brinsmead ==
Robert D. Brinsmead came from a family that were a part of the Seventh Day Adventist Reform Movement, a German splinter group that broke away from the Seventh-day Adventist Church in the World War I era over military service and conscription. They rejoined the mainstream church when he was 10.

Richard Schwarz later wrote of Brinsmead and his supporters, "Although there had been dissident groups in the church from its start, none was more troublesome to Adventist leaders than [Brinsmead's]". According to Schwarz, this background gave him a disposition that was skeptical towards church leadership; although this assertion was removed when Floyd Greenleaf revised Schwarz' work.

Robert D. Brinsmead during the 1960s advocated a form of perfectionism which he described as the "[Sanctuary] Awakening" message, which was picked up and supported by some in a conservative wing known as "historic Adventism". He distorted the Adventist view of Sanctification by injecting the idea that Ellen White supported sinless perfection by self which some supporters of LGT in the "historic Adventists", are accused of presenting in their teachings or writings.

He visited the United States throughout the 1960s, holding retreats and seminars to teach his message. He struck a receptive chord in "historic Adventists", as Brinsmead and his colleagues were convinced that they were recovering the original core message of the founders of 19th-century Seventh-day Adventism.

During the 1970s he abandoned this position and began to emphasize the 16th-century Protestant principle of justification by faith alone but then in the 1980s began to advocate a liberal Christianity theology. He subsequently rejected many of the Adventist beliefs such as in the Sabbath and left the Adventist church and eventually rejected many orthodox Christian teachings.

Most 21st-century Last Generation Theology writers and supporters are not longer aware of the links of their theology to Brinsmead and the controversies of the 1960s and 1970s.

== Criticism of LGT ==
Adventist theologian Richard Rice writes that who teach "sinless perfection" tend to misunderstand and think of perfection as primarily negative, as avoiding certain forms of behavior, or successfully resisting temptations to do wrong. While perfection certainly involves the absence of sinful behavior, it is not just as a negative but it has a positive side as well which consists in the presence of certain attitudes and actions. The example given in the life of Christ Himself, the ultimate manifestation of a holy character.

Adventist historian George R. Knight wrote in "A Search for Identity: The Development of Seventh-Day Adventist Beliefs" the following on M. L. Andreasen views.

First: He emphasized a parallel cleansing of the sanctuary on the anti-typical Day of Atonement, God's people on earth must cleanse their soul temple while Christ is cleansing the sanctuary in heaven.

Second: He held to the understanding that Revelation 15:8 teaches that the final generation will go through the time of trouble without a Mediator.

Third: Ellen White's statement that "Christ is waiting with longing desire for the manifestation of Himself in His church. When the character of Christ shall be perfectly reproduced in His people, then He will come to claim them as His own."

Fourth: He held that Jesus became incarnate in flesh just like Adam after the Fall.

Fifth: That God's end-time people would demonstrate to the universe a people whose lives would proclaim: '"Here are they that keep the commandments of God, and the faith of Jesus.'"

Sixth: Andreasen firmly believed that Christ's atonement remained unfinished at the cross.Knight wrote that according to Andreasen the atonement had three phases.Knight finds that Andreasen said, "Christ demonstrates that man can do what He did, with the same help He had. This phase includes His session at the right hand of God, His high priestly ministry, and the final exhibition of His saints in their last struggle with Satan, and their glorious victory ... The third phase is now in progress in the sanctuary above and in the church below" as Christ is "eliminating and destroying sin in his saints on earth."

=== Nature of Christ ===
According to Adventist historian George Knight, Ellen White's view of the sinful nature of Christ was not the same one held by Andreasen. She, for example, explicitly said that Jesus as a child, had an inclination to right rather than having sinful tendencies. In Knights opinion, Jesus was not just like other children of fallen Adam.

=== Perceived Weaknesses of Andreasen's Last Generation Theology ===
George Knight suggests while it has strong points that are in keeping with mainline SDA theology such as its concern with sanctification, its insight that God's justification in the eyes of the universe is more important than the justification of individuals, has serious weaknesses.

George Knight writes that Andreasen regarded sin as a series of actions. Andreasen's behavior-by-behavior approach to sin led him into the problem of a behavior-by-behavior approach to sanctification and perfection. Such a theory runs into problems from the perspective of both the New Testament and Ellen White's theology.

=== Questions on Doctrine ===
Knight writes that two points in Questions on Doctrine were seen by Andreasen to represent a perceived change from the position of the Adventist Church in the first half of the century.

1. A completed atoning sacrifice on the cross (an issue in theology that seemed to Andreasen to contradict a major point in Adventist belief regarding atonement since 1845, that the atonement that began at the cross is continued in heaven in October 1844) and
2. Christ was born with a sinless human nature.

Knight felt these two concepts undermined Andreasen's final generation theology.Questions on Doctrine stated that Jesus had "provided" the complete sacrificial atonement on the cross while not yielding the Adventist understanding that the atonement continued in the heavenly sanctuary where Christ "applied" the benefits of His sacrificial atonement. To Andreasen the writers of that book "could not teach that the atonement on the cross was final, complete and all sufficient, and yet believe that another atonement, also final, occurred in 1844. Such would be absurd and meaningless".

Edward Heppenstall emphasized the atonement on the cross with a continuing ministry in heaven in the antitypical Day of Atonement. Beyond that, he stressed what became teachings such as the helplessness of human beings to do good on their own accord, justification by faith in relation to the entire plan of salvation, the impossibility of humanly achieving overcoming sin or what some people think of as sinless perfection. Heppenstall's understanding of character perfection was far from ideas of sinlessness, perfectionism, the teaching that people must get to the place where they are sanctified at the end. Heppenstall argued that "nowhere does the Bible equate perfection with sinlessness when speaking of the child of God" and that "salvation by grace means being shaken loose from the folly of implanting our ego at the center [of the plan of salvation] with the belief that we must arrive at sinless perfection to be sure of salvation". Heppenstall in Knight's view demonstrated that it is essentially spiritual maturity and walking with God in love.

In Knight's view one who is in Christ must of necessity be both justified (declared righteous) and sanctified (set apart for holy use), that at the same time that individuals are justified they are also born again and transformed.

=== Appeal to the writings of Ellen White ===
George Knight wrote that, a third important issue Andreasen raised in relation to his argument against the "new" view of the nature of Christ is that Andreasen viewed the statements on the nature of Christ in Questions on Doctrine as being opposed to what he thought was taught in Ellen White's writings. This results in his claim that a person would either have to accept Questions on Doctrine or Ellen White.

Andreasen's theology of perfectionism is inherent in his final generation theology and laypeople and a significant portion of the clergy continued to hold it. Some Adventists who hold to this tend to think of themselves as the believers in "historic Adventism."

== See also ==
- Christian perfection
- Seventh-day Adventist Church
- Seventh-day Adventist theology
- Historic Adventist
