= Historic Adventism =

Informal designation for conservative/traditional Seventh-day Adventists

Historic Adventism is an informal designation for conservative individuals and organizations with the Seventh-day Adventist Church who seek to preserve certain traditional beliefs and practices of the church. They feel that the church leadership has shifted or departed from key doctrinal "pillars" ever since the middle of the 20th century. Specifically, they point to the publication in 1957 of a book entitled Seventh-day Adventists Answer Questions on Doctrine; which they feel undermines Historic Adventist theology in favor of theology more compatible with evangelicalism. Historic Adventism has been erroneously applied by some to any Adventists that adhere to the teachings of the church as reflected in the church's fundamental beliefs such as the Sabbath or the Spirit of Prophecy. They misapply those who hold to mainstream traditional Adventist beliefs as synonymous with Historic Adventist.

Historic Adventists have tended to promote their message through independent ministries, some of which have had a strained relationship with the official church. "Last Generation Theology" shares some elements with Historic Adventism, yet considers itself to have "expanded" the beliefs of Adventism to their logical conclusion. Historic Adventists are seen as at the opposite end of the Adventist theological spectrum from Progressive Adventists. Prominent figures supporting some of the historic views include M. L. Andreasen, and Colin and Russell Standish.

== History ==
Teachings on Christian perfection and personal holiness were present in the religious revival of the Great Awakening in America and were evident in early Adventist movements such as the "Holy Flesh movement" in Indiana around the turn of the 19th century which Ellen White quickly rebuked. They were also evident in some teachings on holiness by medical doctor John Harvey Kellogg, and Jones and Waggoner of 1888 fame.

Joseph Bates was one of the three primary founders of Seventh-day Adventism (along with James and Ellen White). Like many in the early church he focused more on following the requirements of God's law over salvation by grace.

Following the 1919 Bible Conference, in which Ellen White's inspiration was discussed during two days, some defended against what they felt were attacks on her such as Holmes and Washburn, who wrote open letters decrying the alleged "new theology" and the "omega" apostasy of the Adventist church.

Keith Lockhart has described the "Golden Age" of Adventism (from a sociological point of view) as the fundamentalist era of the 1920s–1950s. It is to this time period the expression "Historic Adventism" most accurately applies, not to 19th century Adventism. Along with Malcolm Bull, he says "Adventist fundamentalism" emerged in the 1880s, became dominant in the 1920s, and survives to the present day among conservative groups." They also claim "elements of fundamentalism were re-invoked," becoming discernible in the 1990s.

"But what many authors take to be historic Adventism is in fact a creation of the twentieth century — a synthesis that took place in the 1920s and remained dominant until the 1960s. It was, moreover, a synthesis that in itself represented an accommodation to the newly formed fundamentalist movement."

=== Adventist-Evangelical dialogues ===
It is widely accepted that present Historic Adventism emerged in response to the Adventist-Evangelical discussions that occurred in the spring of 1955 to the fall of 1957. These dialogues were initiated by evangelicals Donald Barnhouse and Walter Martin, who sought clarification on what Adventists believed and took issue with a number of teachings, which at the time were generally thought to characterize Adventist theology. The most significant of these being: semi-Arian views on the Godhead; man's sinful nature taken by Christ in his incarnation; an incomplete atonement at the time of Christ's death on the cross; salvation by obedience to the law; and extreme sectarianism. At least one author considers the various streams existed earlier, as some Millerites came from churches holding Arian views, but this event polarized them.

The Adventist leaders who met with Walter Martin presented a fuller description of mainstream Adventist theology, and described the more fundamentalist views as merely the beliefs of a few. (Le Roy Edwin Froom described them as the "lunatic fringe.") In addition to showing it had clearly moved from semi-Arian views on the Godhead, the Adventists asserted that the belief that Christ took Adam's sinful nature after the fall and an incomplete atonement were not part of mainstream Adventist doctrine. Adventist historian George Knight felt it was not a complete picture as it could be, because a majority of Adventists prior to 1950 had held to these teachings concerning the nature of Christ and the atonement.

Martin and Barnhouse were satisfied with the responses given by the Adventist delegation, and concluded that the Adventist church was a legitimate Christian body. Meanwhile, Adventist theologian M. L. Andreasen, who was aware of these proceedings, openly opposed what he felt was a change concerning the nature of Christ and the atonement and represented the many Adventists who held that view. (Those Adventists who believed Christ had taken a fallen nature still believed that Jesus was sinless and committed no actual sins, but they held that it included propensity or desire to sin). Some of these Adventists continue to oppose the theological direction taken by the church leadership on these issues and the more fundamentalist elements are known today as "Historic Adventists."

Herbert Douglass has stated,

most, if not all, of the so-called 'dissident' or 'independent' groups of the last 45 years are direct results of the explicit and implicit positions espoused by [Questions on Doctrine] on the atonement and the Incarnation.

According to historian George Knight,

Official Adventism may have gained recognition as being Christian from the evangelical world, but in the process a breach had been opened which has not healed in the last 50 years and may never heal.

=== 1970s ===
Desmond Ford convinced Robert Brinsmead his views on perfectionism were incorrect in about 1970. Robert Brinsmead himself however denies that Ford convinced him to abandon perfectionism and further states that he abandoned perfectionism as a result of his intensive study of the issues of the Protestant Reformation, Martin Luther, and justification by faith. During the 1970s, what is now the Adventist Review carried articles by editor Kenneth Wood and associate editor Herbert Douglass rejecting Questions on Doctrine and arguing for a final perfect generation.

The General Conference addressed this controversy over "righteousness by faith" by holding a conference in Palmdale, California in 1976. Ford was the "center of attention," and the resulting document known as the "Palmdale Statement". However the controversy continued and critics of the "new theology" of Ford and others formed institutions to respond them.

Julius Nam has written,

However, the theological heirs of Andreasen have found such developments deeply troubling. Since 1971, several independent ministry groups have arisen within the Adventist church that have self-consciously embraced Andreasen's postlapsarian views and the accompanying theology of the final generation, which they believe is supported by the writings of Ellen White. Since their inception, these groups have warned against the evangelicalization of Adventism and have issued calls to the church at large to return to the Adventism of the pre-Questions on Doctrine era. Like Andreasen, they have seen the Adventist-evangelical conferences and the publication of Questions on Doctrine as the beginning of the end-time apostasy. From the perspective of these groups, the prelapsarian view advocated by Questions on Doctrine and embraced by many Adventists is another sign of the apostasy that continues in the church. They view Adventism as a movement that is to be deliberately separate from other groups such as evangelicals. Their vision of Adventism is a movement that is preparing the final generation of Christians who will ultimately overcome sin.

The 1975 book Perfection: The Impossible Possibility (Nashville: Southern Publishing Association, 1975) edited by Douglass, contained essays by Douglass and C. Mervyn Maxwell supporting traditional Adventist views, and Edward Heppenstall and Hans LaRondelle supporting their view.

== Theology ==
Historic Adventist theology tends to differ from mainstream Adventist theology in the areas of Christology, hamartiology (sin), soteriology (salvation) and eschatology (end times). They often use the term "new theology" as a pejorative term for perceived doctrinal shifts in the church.

With regards to Christology, according to Adventist historian George Knight, most early Adventists believed that Jesus Christ was born with a human nature that was not only physically frail and subject to temptation, but that he also had the fallen predisposition and inclination to sin. Since 1950, the "historic" wing of the church continues to hold this "fallen" view of Christ's human nature, though it is now a minority position among theologians and mainstream Adventism.

Historic Adventists, like mainstream Adventists, believe that sin is defined in terms of personal transgressions of the commandments, over against an inborn corruption of the human nature inherited from Adam.

Historic Adventists tend to place more emphasis on sanctification than justification. Following Andreasen, they define the atonement in terms of God's work to cleanse our character from sin as well as payment of the penalty for sin. The work of Christ in the heavenly sanctuary is regarded as a continuation of the work of atonement begun on the cross, rather than the application of the benefits of an already completed atonement.

"Eschatological perfectionism" is the teaching that a final generation of believers must achieve a state of perfection or complete sinlessness in the final period just before the second coming of Jesus (see Last Generation Theology) and most Historic Adventists hold to that teaching. This belief in sinlessness arose particularly from M. L. Andreasen's interpretation of the investigative judgment doctrine, which is one of the pillars of Adventism and found in The Great Controversy by Ellen G. White.

Historic Adventists generally place more emphasis on the writings of Ellen G. White as a doctrinal authority compared to mainstream Adventists, some considering her writings as infallible and having near-equivalent status to the Bible.

Historic Adventists have a differing perspective on the 1888 Minneapolis General Conference arguing that Ellen White in addition to have supported Jones and Waggoner, but also perfectionistic theology, which some say came from them.

Some historic Adventists, like many mainstream Adventists, are advocates of the King James Only movement, which promotes sole use of the King James Version of the Bible. (A classic book in this movement, Our Authorized Bible Vindicated (1930), was written by an Adventist, Benjamin G. Wilkinson. One critique is by Alden Thompson.) Some historic Adventists (smyrna.org) reject the SDA 28 fundamental beliefs and only accept the 1872 and 1889 Fundamental Principles. Ellen White has stated that the fundamental principles are based on unquestionable authority. "He calls upon us to hold firmly, with the grip of faith, to the fundamental principles that are based upon unquestionable authority." 1SM 208.2

=== Last Generation Theology ===
"Last Generation Theology" (LGT) or "final generation theology" is a belief system held by some conservative members of the Seventh-day Adventist Church, which claims that perfection like the 144,000 will be achieved by some people in the last generation before the Second Coming of Jesus. It is closely related to "Historic Adventism," but as one supporter claims, it differs in that it forms an extension or development of traditional Adventist beliefs, or takes them to their logical conclusion.

== Criticism ==
Mainstream and progressive Adventists have criticised the use of the term "historic." It is observed that numerous doctrinal positions that were common among the Adventist pioneers are generally not held by those who profess to be "historic Adventists," such as semi-Arianism, what time of day the Sabbath should begin, certain understandings of Systematic Benevolence, the "shut door," and the personhood of the Holy Spirit. It is argued that the over-valuing of "historic" beliefs leads to an unhelpful neglect of "new light" and "present truth," which Adventists have always held as defining beliefs.

Walter Martin labeled most of the historic Adventists he encountered as "legalists," "worshippers of Ellen White" and the "lunatic fringe." The term was earlier used by LeRoy Edwin Froom when Adventist leaders met with Martin.

Adventist historian Milton Hook describes it as "Adventist fundamentalism." He cites the aggressive preaching style of George Burnside who attacked Roman Catholics and "apostate" Protestants. Hook says this turned many away, and some of the remaining merely "loved a religious dogfight," and converts "often generated dust storms of intolerance and became clones of militant dogmatism among their peers." He states this style of evangelism was once the norm among Adventist preachers, and had roots in 19th century Methodism in the United States.

Andy Nash wrote that while working at the Adventist Review, he was "often perplexed about how our ability to function at the magazine was disrupted by some folk on the conservative extreme." In response to articles on worship, they would get many critical letters that were based more on tradition than on the Bible. They would airbrush jewelry out of photos to placate some readers.

Historic Adventists look favorably on a past era of the church. Phil Dunham, a fairly conservative author himself, critiqued "nostalgia about the good old days of 'historic Adventism.' In some people's minds it seems to be a time of the most unblemished and unassailable doctrinal positions, the highest possible moral standards, the deepest spiritual maturity, the best snowlike purity, the utmost in readiness to be translated.[...] But the way we often use the expression 'historic Seventh-day Adventism' is built on an idealized and unrealistic notion of what our early church was really like."

"These days a lot of well-meaning people yearn for the supposedly purer days of the past. They feel that if they could just retrieve historic Seventh-day Adventism and bathe in its supposedly clearer waters, they'd be better able to resist last-day influences.
'Back then,' they assert, 'people had a higher level of spirituality — and a lower rate of problems. Back then apostasy was somehow banned, or at least kept at bay.'
Not true. Not true for historic Seventh-day Adventism. Not true for the historic church of Christ — the New Testament church. Not true for the seventh-day church in the wilderness—historic Judaism. Not true even for the First Church of Eden, because its entire two-member congregation ran and hid in naked apostasy.
No, you can't just change your group's name, or meet in a Grange Hall someplace, to escape apostasy. The seeds of apostasy grow not in a name or a place or a time — but in the hearts of every person on this planet since Adam and Eve.[...]"

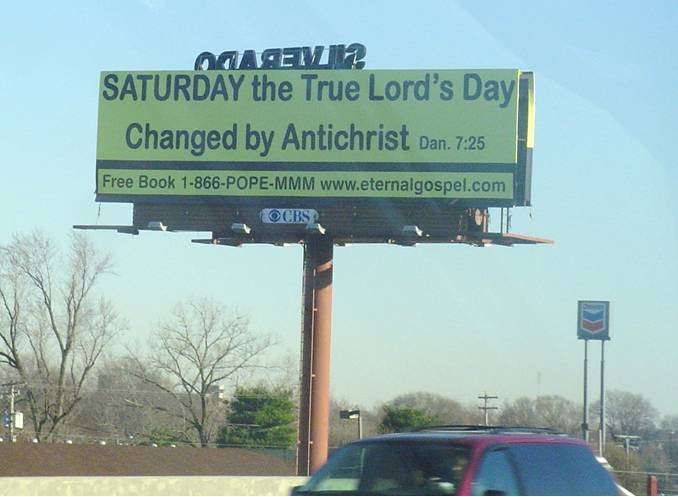
Historic Adventist roadside billboard. Text reads, "SATURDAY the True Lord's Day Changed by Antichrist Dan. 7:25

=== Responses to criticism ===
In response, some historic Adventists have claimed that they are loving in their evangelism and deny that the charge of fanaticism applies to them. They quote statements by Ellen White to support their view. For instance:

"Men will misrepresent the doctrines we believe and teach as Bible truth, and it is necessary that wise plans should be laid to secure the privilege of inserting articles into the secular papers; for this will be a means of awakening souls to see the truth. God will raise up men who will be qualified to sow beside all waters. God has given great light upon important truths, and it must come to the world."

"We must take every justifiable means of bringing the light before the people. Let the press be utilized, and let every advertising agency be employed that will call attention to the work. This should not be regarded as nonessential. On every street corner you may see placards and notices calling attention to various things that are going on, some of them of the most objectionable character; and shall those who have the light of life be satisfied with feeble efforts to call the attention of the masses to the truth?"

Methodist scholar Donald Dayton expressed some sympathies for historic Adventists in his paper presented at the Questions on Doctrine 50th anniversary conference.

== Official church reaction ==
The Seventh-day Adventist Church has officially reacted to two organizations that some say have "historic Adventist" theology, Hope International, and the Hartland Institute (USA) and Remnant Ministries (Australia). In 1998, the General Conference established a committee to evaluate the beliefs and activities and the committee produced a report expressing "serious concerns with respect to the nature and purpose of Hope International and associates."

The conclusion of the report stated that "by rejecting the authority of the world church in session when their interpretation of Scripture and the Spirit of Prophecy differs from that of the church, Hope International and associates have set their authority above that of the world church and operate in a manner that is consistent with offshoot movements." The report also contained a significant escalation: "If Hope International and associates cannot bring themselves into harmony with the body of the world church, clearly evidenced within 12 months, the Seventh-day Adventist Church may need to consider whether there exists a "persistent refusal to recognize properly constituted church authority or to submit to the order and discipline of the church" (Church Manual, p. 169)."

According to one article, the policy of the Adventist church in North America is that members of Hartland or Hope International may not hold any church office.

== Organizations and people ==
=== Para-church ministries ===
In addition to Hope International and the Hartland Institute, there are a number of para-church organizations that assist in the articulation and defense of the Historic Adventists' views. Hope International, formerly led by Ron Spear, runs a publishing ministry and a health center. Hartland Institute comprises an educational college and health center associated with Colin Standish (who founded the organization). It publishes their books and others, as well as Last Generation magazine.

Remnant Ministries was founded by Russell Standish and is based in Australia.

==== Concerned Brethren ====
The term "Concerned Brethren" describes an Adventist movement in Australasia (not to be confused with the Brethren churches, a Christian movement entirely separate from Adventism). The description was used of a group of retired ministers opposed to Desmond Ford's teachings, particularly during his time as head of theology at Avondale College, and who urged for his dismissal. The name derived from their signature or self-designation on a letter in the 1970s, although the stream of thought had been discernible earlier. According to E. Bruce Price, "'Concerned Brethren' was abbreviated to 'CB' as a term of derision for those opposing Dr. Ford's new theology." According to the Standishes, "Hope International is to the United States what the Gazeley meetings are to Britain, and the Concerned Brethren are to Australia and New Zealand."

The group was led by James William Kent (1890 – May 5, 1983, Australia, aged 93), a "veteran Australian evangelist and administrator," who chaired a meeting of "concerned" individuals in Sydney in 1974. On 3–4 February 1976, a group of 16 men (11 "senior ministers," all retired, and five laymen) including Kent and George Burnside (1908–1994), a New Zealand evangelist (described as the "foremost anti-Ford pamphleteer") was given a hearing by 20 men from the Biblical Research Institute in the Australasian Division (now the South Pacific Division). According to one author, Ford's understanding of righteousness by faith was the main issue, while the report describes "concern about the teaching of theology at Avondale College, particularly in the area of the Sanctuary, the Age of the Earth, and Inspiration." In response, the Institute affirmed its support for Avondale in its report.

In March 1977, Kent and others met with Ford and church administrators. They were informed this would be the last time they could meet with church leaders as a group. Kent and Burnside were banned from preaching in the churches on December 18, 1978, because of their continued opposition to Ford. A. C. Needham replaced Kent as unofficial leader around this time, as the latter approached his 90th birthday.

According to Arthur Patrick, "Looking back on the painful saga of the 'Concerned Brethren' from 1974 to the present, it is apparent that a better application of essentials for effective pastoral care may have alleviated some of the controversy." Also, "Following the conflicts that gained intensity in the 1950s, during the 1970s the Adventist Church in Australasia made significant progress in better understanding and presenting 'the everlasting gospel;' but it failed to win the support of certain older members. In addition, viewpoints similar to those of the Concerned Brethren were promulgated by a variety of independent groups." He has described them as "loyalists."

==== Adventist Laymen's Fellowship ====
In 1978, in a conversation on a Newcastle beach (NSW, Australia) between Dr Colin Standish and an Adventist layman, Carl Branster, the issues that had developed over Desmond Ford's theology and the banning of the old pastors from Adventist pulpits, hatched the idea that these men should be given the chance to speak to the laity without the impediments applied by the official church. As a result, the Adventist Laymen's Fellowship (ALF) was founded to counter the growing Desmond Ford movement in Australia. ALF held a series of weekend meetings at Vision Valley (owned by the Wesley Mission) outside Sydney, to which local and overseas conservative Adventist speakers were invited to speak. The first weekend meeting was in November, 1978 and featured Dr Ralph Larson (then pastor of Campus Hill Church in Loma Linda, California), pastors JW Kent, Austin Cooke, George Burnside and Dr Colin Standish. Approximately 800 Adventists attended, part-emptying many Sydney SDA churches on the Sabbath. Attendees came from as far away as Queensland and Victoria.

The initial ALF Committee members were Carl Branster, Nelson Haora, Dr David Pennington, Wal Hansen, Hal Reid, Llewellyn Jones jnr and Bill Turner, all laymen and most of whom were past or current elders in the SDA church. In order to maintain openness and a co-operative spirit with the official SDA church, the Greater Sydney Conference President was invited to attend all committee meetings. The president, in fact, did attend a number of those meetings. Later committee members were Marie Munro and David Black. Over several years, up to twice yearly public meetings were held at Vision Valley featuring local and overseas speakers, including Dr Colin Standish, Dr Mervyn Maxwell, Dr Leroy Moore, Dr Dennis Priebe and Charles Wheeling. Several of those weekend series were attended by over 1,000 people. The ALF also published a magazine for several years named 'Landmarks', edited by David Pennington. The ALF succumbed to theological unorthodoxy when the committee split over some of the prophetic interpretations of Charles Wheeling and disbanded about 1986.{personal communication, David Pennington}

=== Publishing ===
Historic Adventists have a strong commitment to publishing, and often disseminate free literature to promote their views to the mainstream church and wider public.

- Our Firm Foundation is a monthly magazine published by Hope International. Alden Thompson has described it as "the theological heir to the perfectionism of the 'old' Adventist Review (era of Kenneth Wood), though its strident criticism of mainstream Adventism has alienated many who would share its theological perspective." The Standishes consider it "the finest English language message paper in the entire denomination."
- Anchor is a historic Adventist magazine which was first published in April 1985. It was first edited by H. H. Meyers, and later by Ron and Ula Cable; published from Queensland, Australia.
- Pilgrim's Rest or Waymarks are self-published by Vance Ferrell. Alden Thompson describes the publication as "A strident 'Adventist' voice (Vance Ferrell), literally from the wilderness (of Tennessee). Pilgrim's Rest has been active in stirring up traditional elements in Adventist [sic] against the 'compromising' mainstream Adventist institutions, especially the General Conference and Adventist colleges." Ferrell also set up SDADefend.com and EllenWhiteDefend.com.
- Quo Vadis (archives) is a magazine edited by Kevin Paulson. The title is taken from the Latin expression.

=== Other notable historic Adventist people ===
- M. L. Andreasen — author of The Sanctuary Service (Review and Herald, 1947), and credited with developing Last Generation Theology.
- Ralph Larson
- Larry Kirkpatrick is a pastor who runs the "anti-liberal" historic website GreatControversy.org
- Col Martens, of Steps to Life (website) in Australia

=== Former historic Adventists ===
==== Transition to non-Adventist ====
- Australian Robert Brinsmead promoted the "Awakening Movement" in the 1960s before transitioning to a strong evangelical Adventist focus, and then later rejecting many Adventist and orthodox Christian beliefs.

==== Transition to standard Adventism ====
- George R. Knight was once a perfectionist.

==== Transition to progressive Adventism ====
- Woodrow W. Whidden II, who has described himself as "a self-confessed former post-Fall perfectionist". See his interview by Julius Nam, in which he describes historic Adventists and his relationship with them.

== See also ==
- Seventh-day Adventist theology
