= Samuel Koranteng-Pipim =

Ghanaian author, speaker and theologian

Samuel Koranteng Pipim (born December 10, 1957) is a US-based Ghanaian author, speaker, and theologian. Trained in engineering and systematic theology, he based his office in Ann Arbor, Michigan, where, up until 2011, he ministered to students, faculty, and staff at the University of Michigan. He has authored and co-authored more than a dozen books. He has spoken around the world at events for youth, students, and young professionals. He helped begin and has sat on the board of directors for the Generation of Youth for Christ organization (GYC), a revival movement of Seventh-day Adventist youth in North America.

He resigned his ministerial credentials in May 2011 and requested to be disciplined according to church protocol. He was disfellowshipped by his local church on June 15, 2011. Pipim was disfellowshipped for a second time on January 16, 2021, for "allegations of sexual violence by at least 10 women."

== Biography ==
Pipim was born in Ghana, West Africa. He holds a degree in engineering from the University of Science and Technology, Kumasi, Ghana, where he subsequently served as a research and teaching assistant. Having been a leader in a non-denominational, charismatic movement, Pipim later became a Seventh-day Adventist. After accepting the call to the gospel ministry, he worked in the Central Ghana conference as its Coordinator of Campus Ministries. He later went to the United States to pursue a ministerial training at Andrews University where in 1998 he received a PhD in systematic theology, specializing in biblical authority, interpretation and ecclesiology. His doctoral dissertation, The Role of the Holy Spirit in Biblical Interpretation: A Study in the Writings of James I. Packer, was under the supervision of Raoul Dederen, with Clark H. Pinnock as the external examiner.

In 1998, his church leadership in Michigan appointed him to direct its newly created department of Public Campus Ministries to cater for the spiritual needs of students on secular university campuses. Since that time, Pipim's theological ideas and philosophy has had a significant effect on students and young adults the world over.

== Theology ==
=== Method ===
In the 1990s, Pipim played a role in the Adventist debate over the Bible's authority and interpretation, an issue that came into greater prominence with the publication of Old Testament scholar Alden Thompson's Inspiration: Hard Questions, Honest Answers (1991). Perceiving this work "as the archetypical product of historical-critical methodology," Pipim and six other scholars of the Adventist Theological Society issued a rejoinder in their book Issues in Revelation and Inspiration.

An Evangelical publication, Reformation & Revival Journal, describes Pipim's Receiving the Word as "a provocative Adventist treatment which looks at the pros and cons of various methods of Bible study." 'Seeking a Sanctuary describes Pipim as a leading critic of what he deems "liberal Adventism."

In a work on "Adventist Views on Biblical and Prophetic Inspiration," a colleague of Pipim's judged Receiving the Word as "one of the most influential landmarks in that debate" and one of "the two main conflicting poles around which gravitate[d] the contemporary discussions on [the Bible's] inspiration" during the second half of the 1990s.

In addition to challenging the method of moderate liberalism, Pipim's book also worked to make a case for his church's 1986 "Methods of Bible Study" statement, which "urge[ed] Adventist Bible students to avoid relying on the use of the presuppositions and the resultant deductions associated with the historical-critical method." Receiving the Word also claimed the use of contemporary higher criticism (the historical-critical method) was undermining key Seventh-day Adventist beliefs and practices. The book generated considerable reaction—both for and against. Some took exception to the book, dismissing it as a "fundamentalist" view. Scholars who embraced the church's historical positions, however, were more supportive of the book.

Pipim contributed to the Biblical Research Institute's book Interpreting Scripture, published in 2010, a work which attempted to provide answers to questions often raised concerning the Bible. Besides CAMPUS (Center for Adventist Ministry to Public University Students) and the Emmanuel Institute of Evangelism, Michigan Conference's outreach school, Pipim also taught intensive courses on hermeneutics to students enrolled at AFCOE (Amazing Facts Center of Evangelism), ARISE (A Resource Institute for Soul-winning and Evangelism), and LIFE (Lay Institute for Evangelism), supporting institutes run by Adventist supporting organizations.

=== Positions ===
Other than his contribution to Adventist discussions on biblical methodology, Pipim has also been involved in some of the most contentious issues in his church. For example, Pipim contributed to the book Prove All Things (2000), the most extensive critical appraisal of Women in Ministry, a book by scholars at Andrews University such as Gerard Damsteegt. He participated in the church's creation-evolution discussions during the "Faith and Science Conferences" in 2002 and 2004. He has spoken out against the black and white racially-based church structures in North America, the biblical legitimacy of homosexuality, what he calls "unbiblical" divorce and remarriage, certain worship styles, church growth methods that employ gospel gimmicks, prayer warriors and other trends in the church. Also through his reviews of some scholarly works and his foreword or endorsement of certain published authors, he has also articulated his own views on such topics as the atonement of Christ, abortion, and war.

== Work ==
=== Public speaking and writing ===
Pipim has spoken in churches and church gatherings, at schools, civic events and other venues. He has also appeared on various Christian TV channels including 3ABN, Hope Channel and Amazing Discoveries. Pipim has spoken in many African Universities giving a lecture series, dubbed the "Why" lecture series, which largely consists of him asking a series of "Why" questions intended to illustrate his points.

Pipim has authored a number of books including Must We Be Silent? and Here We Stand.

=== Youth ministry ===
Between 1999 and 2011 Pipim served as the director of CAMPUS (Center for Adventist Ministry to Public University Students), a division of Michigan Conference Public Campus Ministries department. It is located near the University of Michigan in Ann Arbor.

CAMPUS was the department through which the Michigan Conference birthed, sponsored and directed the beginnings of Generation of Youth for Christ, then known as the General Youth Conference or GYC.

Pipim has also been active in the Adventist Church's young adult ministry in other parts of the world. One of the ways he has done this is through an organization in Africa, ALIVE (Africans Living In View of Eternity). ALIVE is sponsored by CAMPUS and is a movement that intends to "change the face of Africa" by mobilizing "committed and dedicated young people with the courage to do ordinary things extraordinarily well." In the words of a leader of ALIVE, its members responding to the call "to lead by principle and conviction ... [and to] to cease settling for mediocrity and become an agent of positive change."

=== Generation of Youth for Christ ===
Writing about the history of GYC, a retired communication director of the General Conference of the Seventh-day Adventists states the leaders of GYC were attracted to Pipim's "can-do, tell-it-like-it-is, traditional Adventism" and his "‘higher than the highest’ philosophy: of excellence that he advocated through CAMPUS. Empowered by Pipim's conservative theology and ideals, "these scattered students began dreaming what they called the great experiment in 1999." Critics however, saw GYC as nothing more than another manifestation of reactionary Historic Adventism.

Until his resignation in 2011, Pipim continued to play a large role in shaping the direction of the youth movement through sitting on GYC's board of directors and being a regular presenter at GYC's annual conventions. During the 2008 convention, GYC stated that Pipim had "developed a reputation for his bold messages and commitment to the ultimate authority of God's Word."

== Resignation, rape allegations, re-baptism and disfellowship ==
On May 31, 2011, Pipim resigned from his employment with the Michigan Conference of Seventh-day Adventists and canceled all his speaking appointments due to what he termed a "moral fall" while traveling overseas. The purported victim was a 20-year-old woman, who claimed through her counselor that she was raped by Pipim. The counselor involved was Jennifer Jill Schwirzer, a Christian recording musician, published author, counselor, and seminar presenter.

In response to these claims, Pipim prepared a document titled, "An Answer to Everyone: A Response To False Accusations", which he presented to the Ann Arbour Seventh-day Adventist Church on May 29, 2012, before disseminating for wider publication on June 3, 2012.

Pipim was scheduled to be re-baptized into the worldwide Seventh-day Adventist Church on June 9, 2012, as part of the Ann Arbor Seventh-Day Adventist Church. However, his re-baptism was cancelled due to revelation of information about a separate "moral situation" that he and his wife had been in possession of for two years. With both the affirmation and disapproval of members of the Seventh-day Adventist Church, Pipim was finally re-baptized on June 20, 2014, at the Columbus Ghanaian Seventh-day Adventist Church in Columbus, Ohio.

On January 16, 2021, the Columbus Ghanaian Seventh-day Adventist Church voted to remove Samuel Koranteng-Pipim from membership for alleged sexual offenses. The Ohio Conference of Seventh-Day Adventist released a letter on January 18, 2021, which in part states:

Women have been accusing Pipim of predacious sexual behavior for nearly three decades. Pipim denies many allegations, and repeatedly frames others as infrequent and consensual moral falls. However, the allegations indicate a repetitive pattern of spiritual manipulation and predatory behavior against those who are most vulnerable, least able to defend themselves, and least in a position to seek prosecution for rape or sexual harassment. Especially so, given his self-professed global ministry as a speaker, youth mentor, and writer. The Ohio Conference supports the January 16, 2021 action of the Columbus Ghanaian Seventh-day Adventist Church because the pattern of allegations violates membership reinstatement requirements as outlined by the Seventh-day Adventist Church Manual, p 67. The Ohio Conference unequivocally warns the public against inviting Pipim as a speaker, using his books or materials, or placing him in a position of spiritual authority, leadership, or influence over others.
