= Hope International (Seventh-day Adventist) =

Seventh-Day Adventist organisation

Hope International was an independent organization, operated by members of the Seventh-day Adventist Church. It published Our Firm Foundation magazine and ran camp meetings focused on conservative Adventist messages, originally based on Eatonville, WA, then Knoxville, IL. The magazine has ceased and the website is inactive. A commercial website claiming Hope International's legacy sells “natural” health supplements and advice out of Marshall, NC. In its heyday, Hope International was criticized by the official Adventist church for being disruptive.

== History ==
Hope International was founded in 1964 by church lay members from the Seattle, Washington area. They were concerned about the future of Adventist beliefs, following discussions with conservative Christians and the resulting publication of Questions on Doctrine in the mid-1950s. They purchased land near Eatonville.

According to historian Gary Land, the organization "had no real impact on Adventism" until a retired minister named Ron Spear became actively involved as a leader in 1985. He initiated the magazine Our Firm Foundation, wrote several books, and organized the group's own annual camp meetings. The writings promoted historic Adventism.

The Seventh-day Adventist church issued statements of concern about Hope International in 1992 and 2000.

== Our Firm Foundation ==
Hope International published the bimonthly magazine Our Firm Foundation. According to Alden Thompson, it "is the theological heir to the perfectionism of the 'old' Adventist Review (era of Kenneth H. Wood), though its strident criticism of mainstream Adventism has alienated many who would share its theological perspective."

== See also ==
- Historic Adventism
- Independent ministries of the Seventh-day Adventist Church
