= Seventh-day Adventist independent ministries =

The Seventh-day Adventist Church has a number of supporting, parachurch, independent, self-supporting and other such organizations that work adjunct or in association with the official church.

One author estimated their number at over 800 and are mostly supportive of the church, although differing ministries may be critical of church actions. Adventist Laymen-Services Industries (ASI) bridges these ministries with the church.

== Supporting ==
Supporting ministries are those that exist to support the church's ministry. The Seventh-day Adventist church recognizes the contribution made by these organizations as being such that the main church is unable to contribute to. The organizations adhere to official church guidelines and do not openly solicit tithe or solicit money from members during official functions.

- Arise Online
- Adventist Possibility Ministries
- Adventist World Radio
- Adventist Young Professionals (AYP)
- ASAP Ministries
- Generation of Youth for Christ (GYC), formerly known as the General Youth Conference
- Hyve International
- Hartland Institute (based in USA)
- Hope International
- Remnant Ministries (based in Australia)
- Weimar Institute
- Heritage and Hope Ministries

== Aid ==
- ASAP Ministries
- Asian Aid
- Adventist World Aviation
- ADRA
- Maranatha Volunteers International

== Publishing ==
The Seventh-day Adventist Church owns and operates many publishing companies around the world including one of the largest located in the United States: Pacific Press Publishing Association.

Many private organizations also print, publish, and promote materials supporting the Seventh-day Adventist message.

One of the first vegan cookbooks, Ten Talents (1968), was written by a church member, Rosalie Hurd. The title refers to a quote from Ellen White, "The one who understands the art of properly preparing food, and who uses this knowledge, is worthy of higher commendation than those engaged in any other line of work. This talent should be regarded as equal in value to ten talents".

== Media Ministries ==
Adventists have long been proponents of media-based ministries. Traditional Adventist evangelistic efforts consisted of street missions and the distribution of tracts such as The Present Truth, which was published by James White as early as 1849. Until J. N. Andrews was sent to Switzerland in 1874, Adventist global efforts consisted entirely of the posting of tracts such as White's writings to various locations.

In the last century, these media based efforts have also made use of emerging media such as radio and television. The first of these was H. M. S. Richards' radio show The Voice of Prophecy, which was initially broadcast in Los Angeles in 1929. Since then Adventists have been on the forefront of media evangelism, and one program, It Is Written, founded by George Vandeman, was the first religious program to air on colour television and was the first major Christian ministry to utilize satellite uplink technology.

The Three Angels Broadcasting Network was founded in 1984 by Danny Shelton. Troubled by what he saw on Christian television, Shelton was inspired to "build the television and radio networks that would reach the world with the undiluted three angels' messages of Revelation 14 - the networks that would counteract the counterfeit." Eventually, this would develop into a major 24-hour satellite service seen around the world, consisting of 3ABN (English) television network, 3ABN Radio Network, and 3ABN Latino (Spanish) Network. 3ABN (as it is often called) broadcasts programming from all the major Seventh-day Adventist ministries, as well as its own productions covering religious, health, children, and music programming. This organization is a privately run non-profit organization, and is a supporting ministry (not an official part) of the Seventh-day Adventist Church.

- 3ABN
- Amazing Facts
- It Is Written
- Voice of Prophecy

== See also ==
- Country Life Restaurants
- Seventh-day Adventist interfaith relations
- Seventh-day Adventist Church
- History of the Seventh-day Adventist Church
- 28 fundamental beliefs
- Questions on Doctrine
- Biblical Research Institute
- Teachings of Ellen White
- Seventh-day Adventist eschatology
