= Herbert E. Douglass =

Seventh-day Adventist theologian

Personal details
- Born: May 16, 1927 Springfield, Massachusetts, U.S.
- Died: December 15, 2014 (aged 87) Roseville, California, U.S.
- Occupation: Protestant, Seventh-day Adventist Theologian

Herbert Edgar Douglass Jr. (May 16, 1927 – December 15, 2014) was a leading Seventh-day Adventist theologian and administrator. He was born in Springfield, Massachusetts, US, the oldest of five children (all sons) to Herbert Edgar Douglass Sr (1904–1983) and Mildred Jennie Munson (1908–1988). He graduated from Atlantic Union College in 1947, and earned his Doctorate in Theology at Pacific School of Religion in 1964.

From 1954 to 1957 Douglass wrote commentaries for five books for, and served on the staff that edited, the Seventh-day Adventist Bible Commentary. From 1967 to 1970 he served as president of Atlantic Union College; from 1970 to 1976 as associate editor of the Review and Herald magazine (now the Adventist Review); from 1979 to 1985 as associate Book Editor and vice-president for Editorial Development at the Pacific Press Publishing Association; from 1985 to 1992 as president of Weimar Institute, and from 1997 to 2001 as vice-president for philanthropy at Adventist Heritage Ministry. He had many books published including the 1998 “Messenger of the Lord,” widely considered the most comprehensive book written on Ellen White’s prophetic ministry. From 2003 to 2005 Douglass was a consultant for Amazing Facts ministry. Until his death in 2014, he resided in Lincoln, California.

== Questions on Doctrine ==
On the issues raised in "Questions on Doctrine" Douglass was opposed to the changes it seemed to be bringing in Adventist thought. In "An Historical Footnote", 1975, Douglass briefly discusses QoD and is quite clearly opposed to its presentation of Adventist Christology. On the nature of Christ Douglass writes: "Jesus was like fallen humanity, identical in form and nature, except that He did not sin. That means He was like fallen humanity in every respect from the stand-point of human equipment, including basic desires and needs. But He was not like fallen humanity from the stand-point of human performance: He did not sin."

== Last Generation Theology ==
Douglass was a prominent figure in the 1970s advocating Last Generation Theology, publishing articles in what is now the Adventist Review supporting LGT, along with editor Kenneth H. Wood.

He was a leading theologian within the Adventist church. A key contribution to LGT by Douglass was his articulation of what came to be known as "The Harvest Principle". Herbert E. Douglass developed essentially the very same concepts but independently of Andreasen. Douglass was writing his editorials in the Review in favor of the same belief, but he had never read Andreasen. Finally, after these editorials he read Andreasen's views and did find much commonality. But Douglass had developed his concepts, just as Andreasen had, via his careful study of Scripture and reading of Ellen G. White's writings. Douglass held that all men have succumbed to the inherent passions and tendencies of their sinful natures by choosing to sin, whereas Christ resisted the natural desires of the sinful nature and never yielded to temptation for one moment and thus never transgressed the law of God and always remained sinless.

Douglass taught that Christ's victory over temptation was not on the basis of His divinity but was due to His reliance upon prayer, the study of the Scriptures and reliance upon His Father. This victory was gained in Christ's humanity and His method is available to all men. In this way Christ had no basic advantage over fallen man, according to Douglass, except that man has sinned and Christ has never fallen.

This whole emphasis on the humanity of Christ and His identity with the sinner played a vital role in Douglass' theology. Douglass believed that the example of Christ's humanity is vital for the solution to the "great controversy" between Christ and Satan. God is waiting for the possible to happen when a whole generation of fallen men and women will follow the example of Christ, live as He lived in His humanity and finally vindicate the character of God.

A key contribution by Douglass was his articulation of what came to be known as The Harvest Principle. Douglass believed that man's performance has not always equaled that of Christ. The time will come at the end when fallen man will reduplicate the life of Jesus. In the 'harvest' principle Douglass had found an answer to the problem of man's apparent inadequacy. Just as the plant grows from the seed to the stalk and then to the full grain, so Douglass saw each generation of believers growing and developing until we come to a generation which has achieved maturity and perfection. Pointing to Mark 4:26–29 and Rev 14:14–16, Douglass argued that God is waiting for a ripe harvest, and as soon as that harvest "is fully ripe", He will thrust in His sickle and reap the earth - the Second Coming of Christ will at last come to pass.

== Great Controversy theme ==
Douglass promoted the Great Controversy theme (GCT) as the conceptual key, the organizing principle that leads to an understanding of humanity's greatest questions: How did life begin? Why good and evil, and how does one know the difference? What happens after death? Why suffering and death? The Great Controversy Theme provides the background for the development of evil – the story of Lucifer's (Satan's) rebellion against the government of God. The thrust of Satan's argument is that God cannot be trusted, that His law is severe and unfair, and thus the Lawgiver is unfair, severe, and arbitrary.

According to Douglass: the Great Controversy theme ties together the plan of redemption, Bible truth, and the peril and triumph of Jesus' entry into humanity and his death upon the cross. It holds together Christ's death for us with the application of his power within us. It shows why God purposes to demonstrate through his end-time people the ultimate fruition of what his grace can do, and clarifies how Satan's charges will be finally negated. At the end of time God has called a people to understand, live out, and present to the universe God's love through our individual opportunities in the climax of the great controversy.

== Messenger of the Lord ==
In 1998 Douglass published Messenger of the Lord: The Prophetic Ministry of Ellen G. White, about Ellen White's claimed prophetic gift, after being commissioned by the Ellen G. White Estate.

== Non scholarly books and denominational publications ==
- 1972 If I had one sermon to preach (editor)
- 1973 What Ellen White Has Meant to Me (editor)
- 1974 Why I Joined: Moving Stories of Changed Lives (editor)
- 1975 Perfection: the Impossible Possibility ISBN 0-8127-0097-X
- 1975 We Found This Faith (editor)
- 1976 Why Jesus Waits: How the Sanctuary Doctrine Explains the Mission of the Seventh-day Adventist Church (revised edition in 1987)
- 1977 Jesus: the Benchmark of Humanity ISBN 0-8127-0133-X (with Leo R. Van Dolson)
- 1978 Faith: saying Yes to God ISBN 0-8127-0173-9
- 1979 The End: Unique Voices of Adventists about the Return of Jesus
- 1980 Parable of the Hurricane ISBN 0-8163-0356-8
- 1982 How to Survive the 80s ISBN 0-8163-0491-2 (with Lewis R. Walton)
- 1991 The Faith of Jesus ISBN 0-945460-12-0
- 1994 Rediscovering Joy ISBN 0-8280-0854-X
- 1998 Messenger of the Lord: the Prophetic Ministry of Ellen G. White ISBN 0-8163-1657-0
- 2000 How to Survive in the 21st Century ISBN 0-8280-1423-X
- 2003 Should We Ever Say 'I am Saved'?: what it means to be assured of salvation ISBN 0-8163-1967-7
- 2004 God at Risk: The Cost of Freedom in the Great Controversy Between God and Satan ISBN 978-1-58019-172-2
- 2005 They Were There: Stories of Those who Witnessed Ellen White's Prophetic Gift—and believed ISBN 0-8163-2117-5
- 2006 Truth Matters: An Analysis of the Purpose Driven Life Movement
- 2007 Dramatic Prophecies of Ellen White: World Events Divinely Foretold ISBN 978-0-8163-2192-6
- 2007 Love Makes a Way: Walking with Jesus from Eden to Eternity ISBN 978-0-8163-2231-2
- 2008 "The Jesus Difference" ISBN 978-1-58019-220-0
- 2008 A Fork in the Road: Questions on Doctrine, The Historic Adventist Divide of 1957
- 2010 "The Heartbeat of Adventism: The Great Controversy Theme in the Writings of Ellen White." ISBN 978-0-8163-2458-3
- 2011 "Red Alert: Hurtling Into Eternity" ISBN 978-0-8163-2488-0 (pbk.)

== See also ==
- Seventh-day Adventist Church
- Seventh-day Adventist theology
- Seventh-day Adventist eschatology
- History of the Seventh-day Adventist Church
- 28 Fundamental Beliefs
- Questions on Doctrine
- Biblical Research Institute
- Teachings of Ellen G. White
- Inspiration of Ellen G. White
- Prophecy in the Seventh-day Adventist Church
- Investigative judgment
- The Pillars of Adventism
- Second Coming
- Conditional Immortality
- Historicism
- Three Angels' Messages
- Sabbath in seventh-day churches
- Ellen G. White
- Adventist Review
- Adventism
- Seventh-day Adventist worship
- Last Generation Theology
- Adventist Heritage Ministry
