= Eternal Gospel Church =

Coordinates: 26.6691°N 80.1205°W

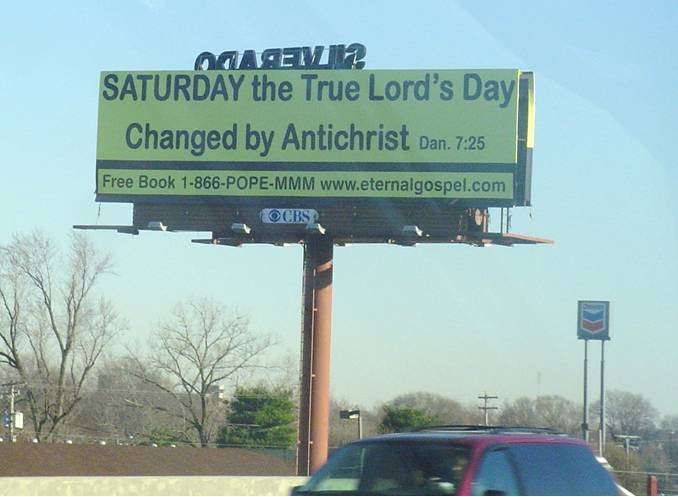
Billboard

The Eternal Gospel Church is an independent religious group. Originally a breakaway from the Seventh-day Adventist Church in 1992, it was previously known as the Eternal Gospel Seventh-day Adventist Church. The group may be best known for its controversial advertising on billboards and newspapers, such as a two-page spread in USA TODAY entitled "Earth's Final Warning" in 1999. A subsequent federal trademark lawsuit between the General Conference of Seventh-day Adventists and Pastor Rafael Perez on behalf of the Eternal Gospel group resulted in a settlement not to use the term "Seventh-day Adventist" in the group's title, resulting in their current name. As of 2020 the group’s website claims three associated churches, and continues to feature the religiously provocative billboard and newspaper messages it has sponsored.

== Controversy and Lawsuit ==
The Eternal Gospel Church received worldwide attention as a result of an aggressive advertising campaign in 1999 consisting of billboards, radio announcements, and full-page newspaper advertisements. Entitled "Earth's Final Warning," the newspaper ads named the Roman Catholic Church as the Whore of Revelation, and criticized the Papacy for its role in instigating the observance of Sunday as a holy day in place of the seventh-day Sabbath. The ad campaign sparked public and Catholic criticism towards the newspapers that ran the ads, and the Seventh-day Adventist Church, which was mistakenly implicated as the source of the advertisements. The complaints prompted apologies from various newspaper publishers and an official statement by the Seventh-day Adventist Church, which soon after initiated legal proceedings against Pastor Rafael Perez for federal trademark infringement.

The lawsuit was criticized by some conservative Seventh-day Adventists, who felt that the advertisement was an accurate representation of their church’s position regarding Rome and that involving the courts in the dispute violated Adventist understanding of Biblical counsel on the matter. Similar criticism was levied against the Eternal Gospel Church in regards to its concession to relinquish the name "Seventh-day Adventist" as part of the settlement agreement. The terms of the agreement stipulated a very specific set of rules for how the church could display its new name and use the term "Founded in (1990 or later) by Seventh-day Adventist believers" as a tagline to "Eternal Gospel Church." According to the General Conference, who said they would be monitoring Pastor Perez closely to insure compliance, the settlement reached their goal of keeping the Eternal Gospel Church from using the name "Seventh-day Adventist" in the name of their church.

== Mission ==
The Eternal Gospel Church considers themselves a revival ministry, calling for a return to certain Historic Adventist doctrines and the foundational principles of the Great Second Advent Movement. They are best known for their evangelistic work in preaching and publishing end-time theological messages regarding the Three Angels' Messages of Revelation 14:6–12 as understood by early Adventists to apply chiefly to Sunday worship and the Roman Catholic Church. The Eternal Gospel Church is not under the auspices of, or in any way affiliated with the General Conference of Seventh-day Adventists.

== See also ==
- Historic Adventism
- Criticism of the Catholic Church
- Seventh-day Adventist Church
