= Last Generation =

Last Generation may refer to:

- "Last Generation", a song from the 2005 album Hide from the Sun by the Finnish rock band The Rasmus
- Last Generation (climate movement), a climate activist group formed in Berlin in 2021
- "The Last Generation" (Star Trek: Picard), season 3, episode 10 of the TV series
- The Last Generation: Prose and Poetry, a 1993 book by Cherríe Moraga
- Last Generation Theology
- Star Trek: The Next Generation – The Last Generation, a Star Trek five-issue comic book limited series published by IDW Publishing (November 2008–March 2009)
