= William G. Johnsson =

Australian theologian and author (1934–2023)

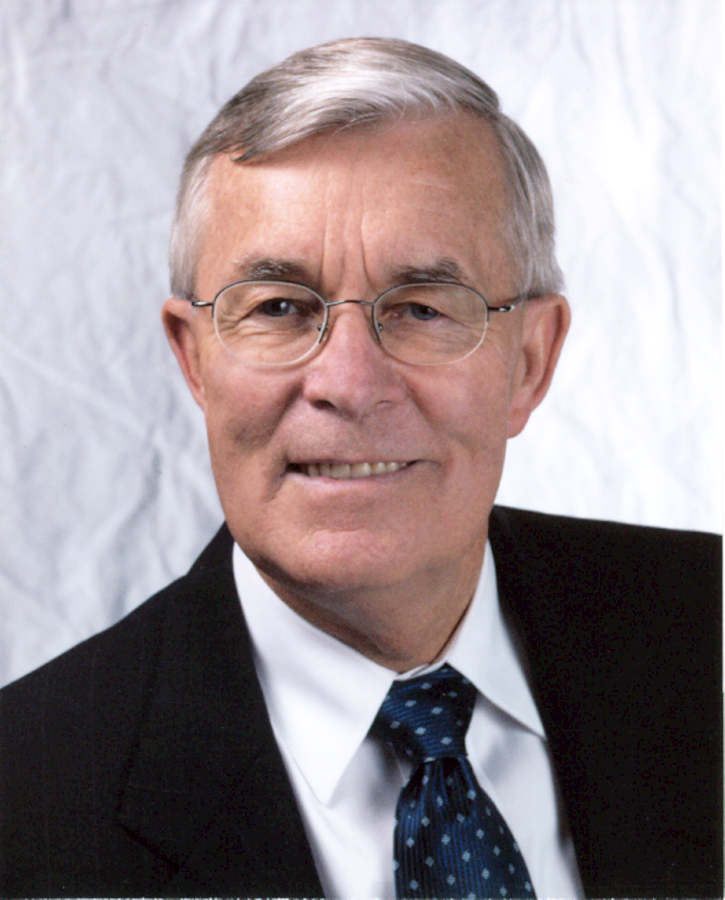
- Born: 20 June 1934; Adelaide, Australia
- Died: 11 March 2023 (aged 88); Loma Linda, California, U.S.
- Education: BTech - Adelaide University (1954); BA - Avondale College (1959); MA - Andrews University (1966); BD - University of London (1969); PhD - Vanderbilt University (1973)
- Spouse: Noelene Johnsson (m. 1959)
- Children: 2

William G. Johnsson (20 June 1934 – 11 March 2023) was an Australian Seventh-day Adventist theologian, author, and editor of the Adventist Review.

== Early life and education ==
Born in Adelaide, South Australia, on 20 June 1934, Johnsson earned a Bachelor of Technology (BTech) degree in chemical technology from the University of Adelaide (1954) before attending Avondale University, where he received a Bachelor of Arts (BA) degree in theology (1959) and met his wife Noelene. His graduate education included: Master of Arts (MA) in Systematic Theology from Andrews University (1966); Bachelor of Divinity (BD) degree from the University of London (1969); and Doctor of Philosophy (PhD) degree in Biblical Studies from Vanderbilt University (1973). His PhD dissertation, written under the direction of Leander Keck, was entitled "Defilement and Purgation in the Book of Hebrews."

== Career ==
Johnsson was a missionary to India at Vincent Hill School and Spicer Memorial College (1960–1975). He served at Andrews University as Professor of New Testament Exegesis and Theology in the Seventh-day Adventist Theological Seminary (1975–1980) and associate seminary dean (1978–1980). In 1979 he was elected as the first president of the Adventist Society for Religious Studies.

Johnsson served as editor of the Adventist Review, the weekly, flagship magazine of the Seventh-day Adventist Church (1982–2006) and founding editor of Adventist World (2005–2006). For most of this time, he was also a trustee of the Ellen G. White Estate. After retiring in 2006, he served for seven years as part-time assistant to the General Conference President for Interfaith Relations.

Johnsson, who wrote more than forty books and 1,000 articles, received the following honorary degrees: Doctor of Divinity from Andrews University (2007) and Doctor of Humane Letters from Loma Linda University (2016).

== Death ==
Johnsson died in Loma Linda, California on 11 March 2023, at the age of 88.

== Books ==
- Living in Love: Snapshots of a Happy Life (2022)
- Experiencing Romans (2021)
- Defilement and Purgation in the Book of Hebrews (2020)
- Authentic Adventism (2018)
- Jesus of Nazareth: His Life, His Message, His Passion (2018)
- Where Are We Headed? Adventism after San Antonio (2017)

Preceded by Kenneth H. Wood	Editor of the Adventist Review; 1982 - 2006	Succeeded by Bill Knott
Preceded by (founding editor)	Editor of Adventist World; 2005 – 2006	Succeeded by Bill Knott
Preceded by (new office)	President of the Adventist Society for Religious Studies; 1979	Succeeded by Fritz Guy
