= Ministry (magazine) =

International monthly magazine

- Editor: Pavel Goia
- Former editors: Derek Morris
- Frequency: Monthly
- Publisher: Seventh-day Adventist Ministerial Association (General Conference of Seventh-day Adventists)
- First issue: 1928
- Country: USA
- Based in: Silver Spring, Maryland
- Language: English, Spanish, Portuguese, Russian, Korean, Chinese, Japanese, Indonesian, French
- Website: Ministry Magazine
- ISSN: 0026-5314

Ministry: International Journal for Pastors is an international monthly magazine for Christian ministers, with a circulation of approximately 78,000. It is published by the Ministerial Association, an official body of the worldwide Adventist church. It is aimed at pastors and ministers of the Seventh-day Adventist Church, and also those of other denominations. It has a monthly circulation of roughly 18,000 to Adventist church leaders, and a bi-monthly circulation of roughly 60,000 to clergy from other denominations on a complimentary basis. As of 2011 it was edited by Derek Morris. The current editor is Pavel Goia. Its ISSN is 0026-5314.

== History ==
Ministry was first published in 1928 and is now available in English, Spanish, Portuguese, Russian, Korean, Chinese, Japanese and Indonesian languages. The original headquarters was in Washington DC. On April 6, 2009 a French edition of Ministry magazine was launched.

=== Editors ===
The current editor is Pavel Goia Previously, the editorial team was led by Derek Morris.

- – Present: Pavel Goia
- 1928–1950: Le Roy Froom

== Awards ==
- Associated Church Press (ACP)
  - Award of Excellence Magazine Cover category for New Testament House Churches, 2008
  - Award of Excellence Magazine Cover category for Preaching Through a Storm, April 2009
  - Honorable Mention Interview category for “Prayer-saturated preaching” by Derek Morris, July 2009
  - Award of Excellence Theological: Biblical Interpretation category for Gerald A. Klingbeil, 2010
  - Award of Merit Reporting and Writing category for David E. Thomas, 2010
  - Honorable Mention Magazine Cover category, 2010
  - Award of Excellence Theological: Biblical Interpretation category for Kim Papaioannou, 2012

== See also ==
- General Conference of Seventh-day Adventists
