= George R. Knight =

American Seventh-day adventist leader

George Raymond Knight
- Born: October 16, 1941 (age 85)
- Occupations: Historian; Author; Teacher

George Raymond Knight (born 1941) is a leading Seventh-day Adventist historian, author, and educator. He is emeritus professor of church history at Andrews University. As of 2014 he is considered to be the best-selling and influential voice for the past three decades within the denomination.

== Biography ==
At age nineteen, George R. Knight joined the Adventist church through an evangelistic series held in Eureka, California, by Ralph Larson. He completed a BA at Pacific Union College in 1965, an MA in 1966 and M.Div. from Andrews University in 1967. He afterward pastored on the Texas Gulf Coast, but resigned from pastoral ministry in the spring of 1969. He then worked as an Adventist school teacher. He completed an Ed.D. in 1976 from the University of Houston, where he studied under Joshua Weinstein. Knight observes that the subject of his dissertation George S. Counts was particularly influential in the development of his thinking, in relating revolutionary and iconoclastic ideas with practical applications. Toward the end of his academic career he had a pivotal 1975 meeting with Robert W. Olson, who at the time worked at the Ellen G. White Estate, and who had been Knight's first Bible teacher. "He merely exuded the sweet love of Jesus and a firm confidence in his faith," notes Knight. "When he left I told my wife that he had what I needed. That day I met Christ in Robert Olson and my life has never been the same."

Upon his reconversion, after his intellectual departure into agnosticism, Knight taught in the School of Education at Andrews University. He had a number of doctoral students who did biographical studies of early Adventist educators. He gradually developed an interest in Adventist history, that led to his transition to the Church History Department, in the Seventh-day Adventist Theological Seminary. His 1985 book, Myths in Adventism, put him on the map in Adventist circles, and he began to rise to prominence in the church. During the 1990s Knight became particularly well known for his fresh insight and popularization of Seventh-day Adventist history. By the year 2000 he was the best-selling Adventist author in the denomination, with a steady stream of doctoral students and graduate assistants who helped him do research for his books. He was also featured as one of the keynote speakers at the 2000 Seventh-day Adventist General Conference Session held in Toronto, Ontario, Canada. In 2005 he announced his plans for retirement that occurred during the summer of 2006. He has already begun work on the first volumes of a devotional commentary of the entire Bible.

== Theology ==
Adventist thinker and former dean of the Seventh-day Adventist Theological Seminary, Denis Fortin, notes that George Knight's theological interests mirror his summary of the major themes of Ellen G. White's prophetic ministry: (1) the love of God, (2) the great controversy, (3) Jesus, the cross, and salvation, (4) the centrality of the Bible, (5) the second coming of Christ, (6) the third angel's message and Adventist mission, and (7) practical Christianity and the development of Christian character. Fortin notes that "to a large extent" that these major themes also reflect "Knight's theological themes, and he explores them at various levels in his books." Knight's foremost theological contribution relates to his understanding of the doctrine of salvation. He believes that Adventism is at its best when sin, atonement, and salvation are firmly rooted in faith in God, and that the plan of salvation rests solely in His grace. He emphasizes, for example, in his book, The Cross of Christ, on the lack of human involvement. "The simple fact is," according to Knight, "that the plan of salvation is God's work, not humanity's. It was Christ who lived the perfect life as a human being and proved that God's law could be kept; it was Christ who died for every person by absorbing the death penalty that resulted from the broken law; and it is Christ who currently ministers in heaven on behalf of those who believe in Him and accept the merits of His death and resurrection. Atonement is all of God.... Christ's work will stand whether or not any human beings accept it. The Bible never gives humanity too prominent a place in the plan of salvation. The great controversy is between God and Satan, not Satan and humanity. Whether or not any human being ever demonstrates God's power in living a 'spotless' life, the atonement will have been completed through the demonstration of Christ's sinless life, death, resurrection, and heavenly ministry." Such a grace-filled perspective has challenged some Adventists who articulate Last Generation Theology within Adventism.

The most significant theological works by Knight are I Used to be Perfect (1994, 2001), My Gripe with God: A Study of Divine Justice and the problem of the Cross (1990, republished in 2008 as The Cross of Christ: God's Work for us), and The Pharisee's Guide to Perfect Holiness: A Study in Sin and Salvation (1992, republished in 2008 as Sin and Salvation: God's Work for and in Us).

== Historiography ==
Within the Seventh-day Adventist Church one of Knight's most recognized contributions is his historiography. Although he trained in the field of philosophy and education, he guided a series of dissertations on early Adventist educational figures. Knight transitioned to the Seventh-day Adventist Theological Seminary in the 1980s, a move that proved especially eventful in preparation for the centennial commemorative celebrations of the infamous 1888 General Conference session. He is generally described as a revisionist historian trying to meet the needs of the practical concerns within the denomination, reflecting his own theological journey away from perfectionistic theology, by reflecting, synthesizing, and describing Adventist history. Adventist historian Benjamin McArthur describes his historiographical significance as creating a "usable past" helping the church to fulfill its mission. He argues that, without Ronald L. Numbers and Walter Rea, there could have been no George Knight, because after all the facts were laid out on the table, Knight was able to become a "moderate voice that was both revisionist and constructive." Brian Strayer, a professor of history at Andrews University, labels Knight as a "revisionist utilitarian historian."

== Books published ==
- 2020. Prophets in Conflict: Issues in Authority
- 2018. End-Time Events and The Last Generation
- 2017. Adventist Authority Wars, Ordination, and the Roman Catholic Temptation
- 2016. Educating for Eternity: A Seventh-day Adventist Philosophy of Education
- 2013. Turn Your Eyes Upon Jesus
- 2012. A. T. Jones: Point Man on Adventism's Charismatic Frontier
- 2012. Exploring Thessalonians
- 2010. William Miller and the Rise of Adventism.
- 2010. Exploring Romans
- 2009. Sin and Salvation: God's Work for Us and In Us
- 2009. Exploring the Letters of John and Jude.
- 2008. Lest We Forget.
- 2008. The Apocalyptic Vision and the Neutering of Adventism.
- 2008. The Cross of Christ: God's Work For Us
- 2007. If I Were the Devil: Seeing Through the Enemy's Smoke Screen
- 2006. Philosophy and Education: An Introduction in Christian Perspective.
- 2004. Exploring Galatians and Ephesians: A Devotional Commentary
- 2004. Exploring Mark: A Devotional Commentary
- 2004. Joseph Bates: The Real Founder of the Seventh-day Adventism
- 2003. Exploring Hebrews: A Devotional Commentary
- 2003. Anticipating the Advent.
- 2002. Walking with Paul through the Book of Romans.
- 2001. Organizing to beat the devil: The development of Adventist Church structure
- 2000. A search for identity: The development of Seventh-day Adventist beliefs; excerpt "What is Adventist in Adventism? Adventist Review online exclusive, 14 June 2001
- 2005. A Brief History of Seventh-day Adventists
- 1999. Walking With Ellen White: Her everyday life as a wife, mother, and friend
- 1998. Philosophy and Education: An Introduction in Christian Perspective.
- 1998. A User-Friendly Guide to the 1888 Message.
- 1998. Ellen White's World: A fascinating look at the times in which she lived
- 1997. Reading Ellen White: How to understand and apply her writings
- 1996. Meeting Ellen White: A fresh look at her life, writings and major themes
- 1995. Hebrews: Full of Assurance for Christians Today.
- 1995. The Fat Lady and the Kingdom.
- 1994. I Used to be Perfect: A Study of Sin and Salvation.
- 1993. Millennial Fever and the End of the World: A Study of Millerite Adventism
- 1990. My Gripe with God: A Study in Divine Justice and the Problem of the Cross.
- 1989. Angry Saints: Tensions And Possibilities In The Adventist Struggle Over Righteousness By Faith
- 1987. From 1888 to Apostasy: The Case of A. T. Jones
- 1985. Myths in Adventism.
- 1983. Early Adventist Educators
- 1982. Issues and Alternatives in Educational Philosophy.

== See also ==
- History of the Seventh-day Adventist Church
- Seventh-day Adventist Church
- Seventh-day Adventist theology
- Seventh-day Adventist eschatology
- Millerism
- William Miller (preacher)
- 28 Fundamental Beliefs
- Questions on Doctrine
- Teachings of Ellen G. White
- Inspiration of Ellen G. White
- Prophecy in the Seventh-day Adventist Church
- Investigative judgment
- Pillars of Adventism
- Second Coming
- Conditional Immortality
- Historicism
- Three Angels' Messages
- Sabbath in seventh-day churches
- Ellen G. White
- Adventist Review
- Adventism
- Seventh-day Adventist Church Pioneers
- Seventh-day Adventist worship

Preceded by Kenneth A. Strand (alone)	Editor of Andrews University Seminary Studies with Kenneth A. Strand; 1988–1991	Succeeded by Nancy J. Vyhmeister and Kenneth A. Strand
