= M. L. Andreasen =

Seventh-day Adventist minister and author

M.L. Andreasen

Personal details
- Born: June 4, 1876 Copenhagen, Denmark
- Died: February 19, 1962 (aged 85) Glendale, California
- Spouse(s): Annie Nelson (from 1896 to her death in 1948); Gladys Grounds (1950 to ?)
- Occupation: Theologian, Administrator, Author and Minister of the Seventh-day Adventist Church

Milian Lauritz Andreasen (June 4, 1876 – February 19, 1962), was a Seventh-day Adventist theologian, administrator, educator, pastor and author.

He was one of the Seventh-day Adventist church's most prominent theologians during the 1930s and 1940s. Andreasen held to the belief that Christians can overcome sin, known popularly as Last Generation Theology, controversial for its views on atonement and salvation. Andreasen became well known for his protests against Seventh-day Adventist church leaders during the last years of his life.

== Biography ==
Andreasen served as president of the Greater New York Conference (1909 - 1910), president of Hutchinson Theological Seminary (1910 - 1918), dean of Atlantic Union College (1918 - 1922), dean of Washington Missionary College (now Washington Adventist University) (1922 - 1924), president of the Minnesota Conference (1924 - 1931), president of Union College, Nebraska (1931 - 1938), and field secretary of the General Conference (1941 - 1950). He taught at the Seventh-day Adventist Theological Seminary (now located at Andrews University) from 1937 - 1950.

== Theology ==
His dispute with the Seventh-day Adventist church was over the theology of the atonement and humanity of Christ that was expressed in a 1957 book Questions on Doctrine (QOD). Andreasen argued that the 'Questions on Doctrine book established a sinister change in Seventh-day Adventist theology. He addressed his concerns in his own book, LETTERS to the Churches. Andreasen urged that 'Questions on Doctrine not be published, and argued extensively with church leaders to correct the ideas they would place into print. Eventually Questions on Doctrine was published and Andreasen went public in identifying what he witnessed as problematic aspects of the book.

The church revoked his ministerial credentials in 1961. Shortly before his death in February 1962, it had been rumored that he reconciled with those whom he had so passionately remonstrated. His credentials were posthumously restored in 1962.

== Publications ==
- Isaiah, the Gospel Prophet (Review & Herald, 1928)
- Man, Here and Hereafter (Pacific Press, 1937)
- The Sanctuary Service (Review & Herald, 1937)
- The Faith of Jesus and the Commandments of God (Review & Herald, 1939)
- The Sabbath, Which Day and Why? (Review & Herald, 1942)
- A Faith to Live By (Review & Herald, 1943)
- Following the Master (Southern Publishing Association, 1947)
- The Book of Hebrews (Review & Herald, 1948)
- The Faith of Jesus (Review & Herald, 1949)
- God's Holy Day (Review & Herald, 1949)
- A Day from Eden (Review & Herald, 1951)
- Saints and Sinners (Review & Herald, 1951)
- What Can a Man Believe? (Review & Herald, 1951)
- Prayer (Pacific Press, 1957)
- LETTERS to the Churches (Hudson Printing Company, 1959)

Andreasen was also one of the contributors to the Seventh-day Adventist Bible Commentary.

== See also ==
- Seventh-day Adventist theology
- Seventh-day Adventist eschatology
- History of the Seventh-day Adventist Church
- Questions on Doctrine
- Biblical Research Institute
- Prophecy in the Seventh-day Adventist Church
- Investigative judgment
- Pillars of Adventism
- Second Advent
- Conditional Immortality
- Historicism
- End times
- Sabbath in Seventh-day Adventism
- Inspiration of Ellen White
