= Questions on Doctrine =

Book published in 1957

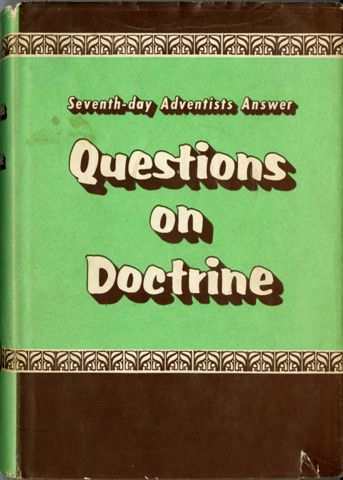
Cover of Questions on Doctrine

Seventh-day Adventists Answer Questions on Doctrine (generally known by the shortened title Questions on Doctrine, abbreviated QOD) is a book published by the Seventh-day Adventist Church in 1957 to help explain Adventism to conservative Protestants and Evangelicals. The book generated greater acceptance of the Adventist church within the evangelical community, where it had previously been widely regarded as a cult. However, it also proved to be one of the most controversial publications in Adventist history and the release of the book brought prolonged alienation and separation within Adventism and evangelicalism.

Although no authors are listed on the title of the book (credit is given to "a representative group" of Adventist "leaders, Bible teachers and editors"), the primary contributors to the book were Le Roy Edwin Froom, Walter E. Read, and Roy Allan Anderson (sometimes referred to as "FREDA").

In Adventist culture, the phrase Questions on Doctrine has come to encompass not only the book itself but also the history leading up to its publication and the prolonged theological controversy which it sparked. This article covers all of these facets of the book's history and legacy.

== History ==
=== Background ===
The publication of Questions on Doctrine grew out of a series of conferences between a few Adventist spokespersons and Protestant representatives from 1955 to 1956. The roots of this conference originated in a series of dialogues between Pennsylvania conference president, T. E. Unruh, and evangelical Bible teacher and magazine editor Donald Grey Barnhouse. Unruh was particularly concerned because of a scathing review written by Barnhouse about Ellen White's book, Steps to Christ. Unruh had sent him a copy of the book in 1949. In the spring of 1955 Barnhouse commissioned Walter Martin to write a book about Seventh-day Adventists. Martin requested a meeting with Adventist leaders so that he could question them about their beliefs.

The first meeting between Martin and Adventist leaders occurred in March 1955. Martin was accompanied by George Cannon and met with Adventist representatives Le Roy Edwin Froom and W. E. Read. Later Roy Allan Anderson and Barnhouse joined these discussions. Initially both sides viewed each other with suspicion as they worked through a list of 40 questions. Central to these concerns were four alleged items of Adventist theology: (1) the atonement was not completed at the cross; (2) salvation is the result of grace plus the works of the law; (3) Jesus was a created being, not from all eternity; and (4) that Jesus partook of man's sinful, fallen nature at the incarnation.

By the summer of 1956 the small group of evangelicals became convinced that Seventh-day Adventists were sufficiently orthodox to be considered Christian. Barnhouse published his conclusions in the September 1956 issue of Eternity magazine in the article, "Are Seventh-day Adventists Christians?" In it, they concluded, "Seventh-day Adventists are a truly Christian group, rather than an anti-Christian cult." This greatly surprised its readers, and 6,000 canceled their subscriptions in protest.

Following this announcement, Adventists were gradually invited to participate in Billy Graham's crusades.

=== Conflict within Adventism ===
In Barnhouse's article it was stated that most Adventists believed in the sinless human nature of Christ and those who did not were part of the "lunatic fringe." M. L. Andreasen, a conservative Adventist theologian, took exception to this statement.

Further debate broke out between Andreasen and Froom in February 1957 after Froom published an article on the atonement in Ministry magazine. In this article Froom argued that the atonement was a "full and complete sacrifice". He furthermore asserted that "the sacrificial act on the cross [is] a complete, perfect, and final atonement for man's sins." Froom's articulation of the atonement still held to the Adventist belief in Christ's work in the heavenly sanctuary going into the Holy of Holies to begin a final atonement for humanity.

Seventh-day Adventists have always believed in a complete atonement that is not completed.

— W. G. C. Murdoch, SDA Theological Seminary Dean, 1980, Discussion, General Conference Session, Dallas

Venden points out that the atonement must have been complete at the cross—the sacrifice was sufficient. When Jesus died for man's sin it was enough to purchase man's salvation and man cannot add anything to it. Yet, the atonement involves more that just sacrifice. The process of redemption, the restoration of man's broken relationship to at-one-ment with God, was not completed at the cross, else there would be no more sin or sickness or pain or sorrow or separation or battered children or hospitals or funeral trains or tombstones or broken hearts. It is the winning of men back to a love relationship with God that is not yet completed.

Andreasen articulated a three-phase understanding of the atonement. In the first phase Christ lived a perfect life despite having a fallen nature. During the second phase the death of Christ on the cross occurred. And finally, during the third phase (the focal point of his theology), Christ demonstrates that man can do what He did. Satan was not defeated at the cross but would be defeated by the "last generation" in its demonstration that an entire generation of people could live a sinlessly perfect life.

Questions on Doctrine intensified the tensions over these issues because it brought more weight to the death of Jesus as a complete work of atonement and that though Jesus possessed Adam’s physical human nature after the fall, he did not inherit Adam's fallen spiritual nature. "When Adam came from the Creator's hand, he bore, in his physical, mental and spiritual nature, a likeness to his Maker—God created man in His own image."

He [Jesus] had a sinless spiritual nature, the same as Adam had before his fall, concerning propensity or tendency to sin. Therefore it was natural for Jesus to be good. [As a child of the fallen Adam], I was born with a sinful spiritual nature and it's natural for me to be bad.

— Morris Venden, 1978, Salvation by Faith and Your Will p. 86

As a consequence, Andreasen embarked on a campaign against QOD. He published a series of responses to Froom in 9 papers written in 1957/1958 and in a series of booklets entitled Letters to the Churches (1959). On April 6, 1961, Andreasen's ministerial credentials were suspended by the church because of his ongoing public protests against church leadership. But a few months later on March 1, 1962, after Andreasen died on Feb. 19, 1962, the General Conference executive committee revoked its earlier decision on his ministerial credentials.

=== Evangelicals divided over Questions on Doctrine ===
In 1960, Walter Martin published his own response to Questions on Doctrine, entitled The Truth About Seventh-day Adventism, which had wide circulation. From June 1960 till July 1961 Adventist magazine Ministry published a long series of responses to Martin's book, which are available online. Other evangelicals besides Martin who argued for the acceptance of Adventism as an evangelical Christian group were Donald Barnhouse, E. Schuyler English, and Frank Mead.

Many conservative Evangelicals disagreed with Martin and Barnhouse's positive assessment of Adventism. The leaders of this view included a large amount of Reformed writers. Differences associated with the Calvinist-Arminian dispute were a major part in the debate (Adventism is soteriologically Arminian), but Martin did not regard conformity to Calvinism as a test of Christian orthodoxy. In 1962 Norman F. Douty published Another Look at Seventh-day Adventism and Herbert Bird, Theology of Seventh-day Adventism, both of which argued that Adventists were still a cult. Dutch Calvinist theologian Anthony Hoekema grouped Adventism together with Mormonism, Jehovah's Witnesses and Christian Science in his 1963 publication The Four Major Cults. In this book Hoekema praises Adventists for moving away from Arianism, but argues that Questions on Doctrine failed to truly repudiate the doctrine of Christ's sinful nature, and similarly failed to remove ambiguities and inconsistencies regarding the atonement.

=== Legacy ===
Questions on Doctrine has proven to be divisive for many Adventists in the latter half of the twentieth century. Church historian George R. Knight has written that "Official Adventism may have gained recognition as being Christian from the evangelical world, but in the process a breach had been opened which has not healed in the last 50 years and may never heal." Conservative Herbert Douglass agreed, "most, if not all, of the so-called 'dissident' or 'independent' groups of the last 45 years are direct results of the explicit and implicit positions espoused by Questions on Doctrine on the atonement and the Incarnation."

Around 138,000 to 147,000 copies of QOD were circulated, but the book was so controversial that it was placed out of print in 1963. Throughout the following decades, the two Adventist camps—those who supported and opposed QOD respectively—continued to struggle with the issues it brought up which was not eased by "the ambiguous stance taken by General Conference leadership on Questions on Doctrine".

Much of the controversy had centred on the nature of the incarnate Christ and the Augustinian doctrine of Original Sin. Regarding the Nature of Christ on Earth, the prelapsarian position was accepted by the authors of QOD as a 'sine qua non' for acceptance with the Evangelicals. Froom had attempted to support this in QOD with a number of quotations from the writings of Ellen White. He used a "cut and paste" technique before digitisation was available. In 1978, Ralph Larson published a short pamphlet entitled "The Fraud of the Unfallen Nature", in which he painstakingly dissected out the clauses pasted together by Froom and decisively demonstrated that in almost every instance the excerpts taken from her writings, in context, said exactly the opposite. He went on to show that Ellen White endorsed the postlapsarian position, either directly or by implication in over 400 quotations. The main use of her writings to endorse the opposite position had come from the famous "Baker Letter", written by E. G. White to a Tasmanian pastor who had taken a Christological position of Adoptionism, which was a variant of Arianism. At that time (1890s) the SDA position on the Trinity was moving away from the Arian position of some of the pioneers, such as Uriah Smith. Whilst supporting the equality and divinity of the three members of the Godhead, Ellen White prudently avoided using the term 'Trinity', as the term had variable interpretations by different religious groups, including Catholicism. She had simply warned Baker to be careful how he described the human nature of Christ, lest people were to believe that He was a created being, and therefore take the position that He was a sinner. Larson later published The Word Was Made Flesh in which he devoted a chapter to the misquoting of Ellen White on Christology.

Meanwhile, evangelicals were concerned that the withdrawal of QOD signified a doctrinal retreat by Adventists and called for the book to be reprinted. In an interview around 1986 with Adventist Currents, Martin himself said:

"If the Seventh-day Adventist [Church] will not back up its answers with actions and put Questions on Doctrine back in print... then they're in real trouble that I can't help them out of; and nobody else can either."

QOD was not republished until Andrews University Press independently chose to reprint the book in 2003 as part of their "Adventist Classic Library" series. This new edition contained annotations and a historical introduction by George R. Knight. The text of the original book had also been available online for several years prior to this republishing, through a private website. One review is by Nancy Vyhmeister.

"It's a very positive and aggressive statement of Adventist beliefs", according to George Knight. "This book played an important role in the history of the Adventist Church", according to Gerhard Pfandl. Questions on Doctrine generated a theological movement which backs the theology of Andreasen and opposes the teaching set forward in the book. These "historic Adventists" perceive Questions on Doctrine as representing a major departure from traditional Adventist teaching, and believe that its publication has been harmful to the church. Other Adventists feel that Questions on Doctrine represents a courageous and insightful restatement of Adventist theology, while acknowledging that the book is not free from fault. For instance, it is clear that the authors pushed the facts too far with regard to Adventism's historic understanding of the Trinity, and present data about the human nature of Christ in a way that presents a false impression.

Evangelical Kenneth Samples has described four unique perspectives of Walter Martin given by Adventist friends of Samples. A more evangelical Adventist told him, "I really like Walter Martin. He stood up for us." A more liberal Adventist said, "Who's Walter Martin that he should ever question our orthodoxy?!" A more fundamentalist Adventist said, "Walter Martin poisoned our church." A cultural Adventist friend said, "Who's Walter Martin?"

Walter Martin considered his impact on evangelicals' perception of Adventism one of the highlights of his career.

== 50th anniversary conference ==
A scholarly conference marking the 50th anniversary of the book's publication was held from October 24–27, 2007 at Andrews University in Michigan. It was precipitated by Julius Nam's 2005 doctoral dissertation on the book. Scholars, church leaders and pastors from widely varying positions on the Adventist theological spectrum gathered with non-Adventist evangelical scholars interested in Questions on Doctrine for dialogue. Prior to the event, General Conference administrators including incumbent president Jan Paulsen had voiced reservations and even outright opposition to the conference, fearing that it might reignite a firestorm of controversy within the denomination. In spite of this, the conference was hailed as a success by participants from all sides, and was felt to have promoted "healing".

The organizers of the conference were Julius Nam, Michael W. Campbell and Jerry Moon, Adventist scholars specializing in Adventist history. Three institutions co-sponsored the event: Andrews University, Loma Linda University and Oakwood College. The keynote speakers were conservative theologian Herbert Douglass, Adventist historian George Knight, and Biblical Research Institute director Ángel Rodríguez. Presenters included Roy Adams, Arthur Patrick, Jon Paulien, Richard Rice, A. Leroy Moore and Woodrow Whidden. The "conservative" position was represented by Larry Kirkpatrick, Colin and Russell Standish as well as Douglass. In addition there were contributions from non-Adventist scholars Kenneth Samples and Donald Dayton.

== Topics ==
Questions on Doctrine addressed the following topics:

- Christology
- The role of Ellen G. White's writings
- The role of the law
- The Sabbath
- The Sunday-law and Mark of the Beast
- The meaning of the remnant
- The prophecies of Daniel chapters 8 and 9
- The Adventist doctrines of the heavenly sanctuary and investigative judgment
- The second coming of Jesus
- Death and hell

== See also ==
- Seventh-day Adventist theology
- The Pillars of Adventism
- History of the Seventh-day Adventist Church
- Walter Martin
- M. L. Andreasen
