= Alden Thompson =

Alden L. Thompson

Personal details
- Occupation: Theologian

Alden Lloyd Thompson is a Seventh-day Adventist Christian theologian, author, and seminar presenter. He is also a professor of biblical studies at Walla Walla University in Washington, United States.

== Biography ==
He graduated from Walla Walla College in 1965 with a BA. The same year he married Wanda Hoffman. Thompson graduated from Andrews University with an MA in 1966 and a BD in 1967.

After serving as a pastor in southeastern California from 1967 to 1970, he became a faculty member of Walla Walla University in 1970. From 1972 to 1974 he attended the University of Edinburgh in Scotland. He was awarded with a doctorate in Old Testament and Judaic Studies in 1975, and his dissertation was published in 1977 by Scholars Press.

In 1980 and 1981, he taught at Marienhoehe Seminary in Darmstadt, Germany. From 1986 to 1990 he served as the academic vice president of Walla Walla College, returning to full-time teaching in the School of Theology in 1990.

== Theology ==
Thompson has written much about the inspiration of the Bible and prophets. He published a 4-part series "Adventists and Inspiration" in the Adventist Review, in 1985. Subsequently, church publisher Review and Herald invited him to submit a book manuscript for publication. This became the 1991 book Inspiration: Hard Questions, Honest Answers, which had a large impact in the Adventist church. (Baptist scholar Clark Pinnock reviewed it very favourably.) Two conservative responses to Thompson were published. Firstly was Issues in Revelation and Inspiration, published by the Adventist Theological Society the following year. Secondly was Samuel Koranteng-Pipim, Receiving the Word (1996) which was reviewed by Thompson in turn. Thompson is open to a small use of the historical-critical method of Bible interpretation, although many Adventists reject this method, for example, the 1986 statement Methods of Bible Study, "urge[s] Adventist Bible students to avoid relying on the use of the presuppositions and the resultant deductions associated with the historical-critical method."

He is very much concerned with church unity, and has described his 2009 book Beyond Common Ground: Why Liberals and Conservatives Need Each Other as "a kind of capstone to my teaching career." He has also discussed differing personality types and how they relate to God and the church.

He supports the process of change, and has argued for significant change in Ellen G. White's views of God (see: inspiration of Ellen White#Change over time. For instance, his best known series is "From Sinai to Golgotha", a five-part sequence published in 1981 in the Adventist Review. It discusses a change from a more fear-based picture of God in the Bible at Mt Sinai, to a more grace-based image of God at the cross. He also claims Ellen White moved from fear to joy. See also his article, "The Scary Lady of Adventism Learns to Have Fun". His book Escape from the Flames: How Ellen White Grew from Fear to Joy - and Helped Me to Do it Too (2005) has a similar theme.

Thompson's speaking engagements and writings cover many topics, including the Bible, especially the Old Testament, Ellen White studies, inspiration (see biblical inspiration, revelation), and Adventist history.

== Non scholarly books and denominational publications ==
His books include:

- 2009. Beyond Common Ground: Why Liberals and Conservatives Need Each Other, Pacific Press; publisher's page
- 2005. Escape from the Flames: How Ellen White Grew from Fear to Joy - and Helped Me to Do it Too (Pacific Press). ISBN 0-8163-2085-3
- 1995. Samuel: From the Danger of Chaos to the Danger of Power. Boise, ID: Pacific Press (part of The Abundant Life Bible Amplifier series) ISBN 0-8163-1265-6
- 1991. Inspiration: Hard Questions, Honest Answers, (Review and Herald), now translated into German and Dutch
- 1988. Who's Afraid of the Old Testament God? (Paternoster, 1988; Zondervan, 1989). ISBN 0-310-51921-7; one publisher's page (fifth edition)
- 1977 Responsibility for Evil in the Theodicy of IV Ezra (Ph.D. thesis) Dissertation series, Society of Biblical Literature; no. 29)

Two chapters were withdrawn from Inspiration prior to publication, "Eschatology: The Angels Always Say the Time Is Short" (RTF format), and "The Adventist Church at Corinth" (RTF), which describes three dominant strands of Adventist theology. These were eventually published in Beyond Common Ground.

== See also ==
- Walla Walla University
- Progressive Adventism

| Preceded by Sakae Kubo | President of the Adventist Society for Religious Studies; 1987 | Succeeded by James Londis |
