= Le Roy Froom =

Seventh-day Adventist minister and historian (1890–1974)

Le Roy E. Froom
- Born: October 16, 1890
- Died: February 20, 1974 (aged 83); Takoma Park, Maryland, US
- Occupations: Seventh-day Adventist historian and Pastor

Le Roy Edwin Froom (October 16, 1890 – February 20, 1974) was a Seventh-day Adventist minister and historian whose writings and interpretations are a cause of much debate in the Adventist Church. He also was a central figure in the meetings with evangelicals that led to the producing of the theological book, Questions on Doctrine which easily qualifies as the most divisive book in Seventh-day Adventist history.

== Life ==
Froom studied at Pacific Union College and Walla Walla College (now Walla Walla University), before graduating from Washington Training Center, now Washington Adventist University.

Froom was the first associate secretary of the General Conference Ministerial Association from 1926 to 1950. He was also the founding editor of Ministry Magazine. From 1950 until his retirement in 1958 he was a field secretary of the General Conference assigned to research and writing. He was part of the developments in the ministerial institutes during the 1920s, emphasizing the Holy Spirit as a person, rather than a divine influence, and authoring the first book in the church on the Holy Spirit as the Comforter.

== Publications ==
Froom is best known for his apologetic writings and his attempts to help non-Adventists understand his own denomination. The most famous resulted in the publication of Questions on Doctrine in 1957.

=== The Prophetic Faith of Our Fathers ===
His best known work was the Prophetic Faith of Our Fathers, consisting of four volumes published from 1946 to 1954 (III 1946, II 1948, I 1950, IV 1954), and covers the Christian Era. These four volumes are the result of more than sixteen years of intensive research including three extensive trips to Europe as well as in America. This work analyzes the understanding of Bible Prophecy by Christian theologians and scholars beginning in the 1st century AD to the late 19th century.

==== Critical reception to The Prophetic Faith Of Our Fathers ====
In this work Froom argued that the "historicist" interpretation of Bible prophecy had been the earliest and most extensively used throughout history, and that other schemes were not only novelties in comparison but had emerged as the result of attempts to deflect the condemnation of the Roman Catholic Church which typically accompanied historicist exposition. Froom spent over 20 years compiling a collection of documentation which numbered over 1,000 works. Each volume of Froom's work has a bibliography which typically runs to over 30 pages and cites hundreds of sources.

Although largely substantiating the Adventist understanding of prophecy (which is historicist in nature), the work received some favorable reviews from non-Adventist scholars. When published, the first volume was praised for its value for money, the scope of its research, and its documentation. Another contemporary review of the first volume noted "An astounding amount of reading, traveling, compilation, and patient research has gone into the preparation of this book", characterizing it as "a rich summary of an enormous lot of materials".

An early review of the second volume described it as "a quarry of information on the subject which will be useful to scholars in many fields", though it was noted that "The historical picture is curiously distorted" due to the Adventist focus on specific prophetic interpretations. This limited focus is a commonly found criticism of the work. A 1952 review of the first two volumes complimented their breadth of research, but lamented "The scope of the work is seriously delimited, however".

Despite criticism of the work's limited focus, the reviewer also noted "Specialists can find here a wealth of material", and praised the care with which the research had been undertaken and presented. In a review of the first volume, the same author spoke highly of the work's contribution to scholarship, though again criticizing its narrow focus.

Early reviews noted Froom's skill as a historian, and predicted that the work would become recognized as a standard reference on the subject. In recent years Froom's work is still praised for its extensive review and analysis of the history of prophetic interpretation, and is referred to as the classic work on the subject by theological scholars (as well as by secular scholars). Ernest R. Sandeen, in commenting on this "monumental" work, nonetheless drew attention to the "pitfalls" facing those who follow "Froom's guidance uncritically". While "useful as a reference work [and] astonishingly accurate", it is "virtually without historical merit when Froom lifts his eyes above the level of the catalog of the British Museum".

=== Primary publications ===
- The Coming of the Comforter
- Prophetic Faith of Our Fathers (4 volumes, 1946–54)
  - Volume 1: Early Church Exposition, Subsequent Deflections, and Medieval Revival
  - Volume 2: The Historical Development of Prophetic Interpretation
  - Volume 3
  - Volume 4
- Movement of Destiny
- The Conditionalist Faith of Our Fathers (2 volumes, 1965–1966). Described as "a classic defense of conditionalism" by Clark Pinnock
  - Volume 1
  - Volume 2

== Controversy ==
Adventist historian George Knight has noted that Questions on Doctrine "easily qualifies as the most divisive book in Seventh-day Adventist history". and M. L. Andreasen, a theologian and author on the sanctuary doctrine, saw the book as "the most subtle and dangerous error" and "a most dangerous heresy."

== Death ==
Froom died on February 20, 1974, at age 83 while working on his final book, The Holy Spirit – Executive of the Godhead and was buried in plot 860 of the George Washington Cemetery in Adelphi, Maryland.

== See also ==
- 28 Fundamental Beliefs
- Adventist
- Adventist Review
- Conditional Immortality
- Historicism (Christianity)
- History of the Seventh-day Adventist Church
- Inspiration of Ellen White
- Investigative judgment
- The Pillars of Adventism
- Prophecy in the Seventh-day Adventist Church
- Questions on Doctrine
- Sabbath in seventh-day churches
- Second Coming
- Seventh-day Adventist Church
- Seventh-day Adventist eschatology
- Seventh-day Adventist theology
- Seventh-day Adventist worship
- Teachings of Ellen White
- Three Angels' Messages
- Ellen G. White
