= Great Controversy theme =

Aspect of Seventh-day Adventist theology

In Seventh-day Adventist theology, the Great Controversy theme refers to the cosmic battle between Jesus Christ and Satan, also played out on earth. Ellen G. White, a member of the Seventh-day Adventist Church delineates the theme in her book The Great Controversy, first published in 1858. The concept, or metanarrative, derives from many visions the author reported to have received, as well as from scriptural references. Adventist theology sees the concept as important in that it provides an understanding of the origin of evil, and of the eventual destruction of evil and the restoration of God's original purpose for this world. It constitutes belief number 8 of the church's 28 Fundamentals.

== Background ==
The concept of a "great controversy" or conflict between Christ and Satan is found in English theological literature predating the writings of Ellen G. White. This theme appears in several works published between the late seventeenth and eighteenth centuries.

For example, Anthony Horneck, in The Great Law of Consideration (1688), describes a “conflict between the Spirit and the Flesh, between Christ and Belial” (p. 180). John Hurrion’s The Knowledge of Christ and Him Crucified (1727) refers to “the conflict between Christ and Satan,” particularly in the context of Christ’s crucifixion and the defeat of the serpent (p. 365).

Matthew Henry, in his Exposition of the New Testament (1757), uses the phrase “the great controversy between Christ and Beelzebub” (p. 262). James Morison’s An Attempt to Vindicate, Explain, and Enforce the Important Duty of Renewing Our Solemn Covenants (1767, 1789) includes references to “the great controversy between Christ and Belial” and connects this theme to the church’s ultimate victory as promised in Revelation 12:11.

Similarly, An Exposition of the Old and New Testament (1791) repeats the language of a “great controversy between Christ and Beelzebub” (p. 427). The phrase “great conflict between the Church” also appears in works such as Jonathan Edwards’ Humble Attempt to Promote Explicit Agreement and Visible Union of God’s People in Extraordinary Prayer (1747), which describes “the last great Conflict between the Church of Christ and her Enemies” (p. [unpaginated]).

== The Great Controversy Theme in Adventist Theology ==
One of the 28 fundamental beliefs of Seventh-day Adventists states:

8. Great Controversy:
All humanity is now involved in a great controversy between Christ and Satan regarding the character of God, His law, and His sovereignty over the universe. This conflict originated in heaven when a created being, endowed with freedom of choice, in self-exaltation became Satan, God’s adversary, and led into rebellion a portion of the angels. He introduced the spirit of rebellion into this world when he led Adam and Eve into sin. This human sin resulted in the distortion of the image of God in humanity, the disordering of the created world, and its eventual devastation at the time of the global flood, as presented in the historical account of Genesis 1-11. Observed by the whole creation, this world became the arena of the universal conflict, out of which the God of love will ultimately be vindicated. To assist His people in this controversy, Christ sends the Holy Spirit and the loyal angels to guide, protect, and sustain them in the way of salvation. (Gen. 3; 6-8; Job 1:6-12; Isa. 14:12-14; Ezek. 28:12-18; Rom. 1:19-32; 3:4; 5:12-21; 8:19-22; 1 Cor. 4:9; Heb. 1:14; 1 Peter 5:8; 2 Peter 3:6; Rev. 12:4-9.)

=== The Great Controversy on the end time ===
Seventh-day Adventists regard The Great Controversy as an important work. In the book, she writes of the perfection of those who stand at the end of time while Christ still intercedes in the heavenly Most Holy Place:

"Now, while our great High Priest is making the atonement for us, we should seek to become perfect in Christ. Not even by a thought could our Saviour be brought to yield to the power of temptation . . . This is the condition in which those must be found who shall stand in the time of trouble." (GC 623).

The urgency for attaining perfection comes from the knowledge that the remnant must live perfectly during the "time of trouble" at the end to prove to the universe that fallen human beings can keep the law of God. Ellen White states, "When He leaves the sanctuary, darkness covers the inhabitants of the earth. In that fearful time the righteous must live in the sight of a holy God without an intercessor." (GC 614).

White explains this is necessary because the "earthliness" of the remnant must be cleansed that the image of Christ may be perfectly reflected: "God's love for His children during the period of their severest trial is as strong and tender as in the days of their sunniest prosperity; but it is needful for them to be placed in the furnace of fire; their earthliness must be consumed, that the image of Christ may be perfectly reflected."(GC 621).

White emphasizes that attaining God's blessing will mean denying self: "Those who are unwilling to deny self, to agonize before God, to pray long and earnestly for His blessing, will not obtain it. Wrestling with God–how few know what it is!" (GC 621).

Ellen White in The Great Controversy and in her other writings does not link perfection to something that happens from the believer, but with what God does for the believer through Christ. She states that those who try to trust in their own righteousness cannot understand how it comes through Christ.

== See also ==
- The Great Controversy (book)
- Seventh-day Adventist theology
- Seventh-day Adventist eschatology
- 28 Fundamentals
- Ellen G. White
