= Kenneth H. Wood =

Orders
- Ordination: 1942

Personal details
- Born: November 5, 1917 Shanghai, China
- Died: May 25, 2008 (aged 90) Potomac, Maryland
- Denomination: Seventh-day Adventist
- Parents: Kenneth H. Wood, Sr
- Occupation: Minister, author and editor
- Education: Far Eastern Academy in Shanghai
- Alma mater: Pacific Union College

Kenneth H. Wood, Jr. (November 5, 1917 – May 25, 2008) was a Seventh-day Adventist minister, author and editor. Since 1980 he served as chairman of the Ellen G. White Estate board of trustees. By virtue of this position he also served as an ex officio member of the General Conference Executive Committee.

== Life and work ==
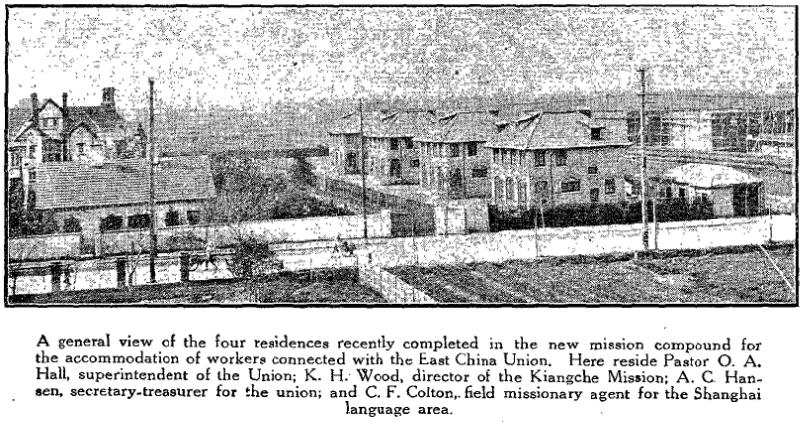
Kenneth H. Wood, Jr. Childhood Home, Mission Compound, China

Kenneth H. Wood, Jr. was born on November 5, 1917, in Shanghai, China. His parents had sailed for China, November 23, 1912, aboard the S.S. Nile. Kenneth H. Wood, Sr. served as the Director of the Jiangsu Mission. and then as Superintendent of the East China Union and Manchurian Union. The senior Woods lived in China for almost thirty years from 1912 to 1941

Before the age of 15, Kenneth Jr. attended Far Eastern Academy in Shanghai.(Citation to be added)

In 1932, Kenneth, Jr. moved to the United States to further his education. (Citation to be added)

He graduated from Pacific Union College in 1938.

=== 1938–1955, Pastoral years ===
1940. K. H. Wood, Jr. reported on an evangelistic campaign conducted at the Fresno, California 'Bible Auditorium.' One of his earliest essays to be published was entitled, "A Message of Comfort." It appeared in the Review and Herald, February 29, 1940. In early 1942. Kenneth Wood attended the Theological Seminary at Washington, D.C. In the summer of that year, he was ordained at the West Virginia Camp Meeting at Parkersburg. From there he served as a pastor in Charleston, West Virginia.

=== 1955–1966, Associate editor of the Review and Herald ===
In 1955 he became associate editor of the Review and Herald (now the Adventist Review). He served on the staff for 27 years; 16 as editor in chief, beginning in 1966 after the death of Francis D. Nichol.

=== 1966–1982, Editor of the Review and Herald ===
His editorship has been noted for its supportive stance toward the church in contrast to journals such as Spectrum that began to give a more critical perception of the church. His last issue as editor was November 25, 1982.

It was under his editorship that the name of the Review and Herald changed to the Adventist Review. It was also under his editorship that the Review expanded from one edition in English to nine editions in four languages. Ten associate editors served with Wood: F. Donald Yost, Don F. Neufeld, Herbert E. Douglass, Thomas A. Davis, Joseph J. Battistone, Raymond F. Cottrell, Jack J. Blanco, Leo R. Van Dolson, William G. Johnsson, and George W. Reid. A significant development was the appointment of two women to the editorial staff: Jocelyn R. Fay (appointed in 1977) and Aileen Andres Sox (appointed in 1980).

He is known for his support of the traditional views of Adventist theology including the post-fall human nature of Christ.

=== 1982–2008, Retirement years ===
He died on May 25, 2008, in Potomac, Maryland, at the age of 90.

== Views on Last Generation Theology ==
Kenneth H. Wood along with Herbert Douglass published articles in what is now the Adventist Review supporting Last Generation Theology. Kenneth Wood and his associate editors of the Review prepared a special issue setting forth sanctification as an article of righteousness by faith.

== Bibliography ==
- Meditations for Moderns (Review and Herald, 1964)
- His Initials Were F. D. N.: A Life Story of Elder F. D. Nichol, For Twenty-One Years Editor of the Review and Herald (with Mirriam Wood) (Review and Herald, 1967)
- Short Essays on Relevant Religion (Review and Herald, 1972).

As chair of the Ellen G. White Estate board he has also participated in editing a number of Ellen G. White publications that have been published since 1980.

Preceded by Francis D. Nichol	Editor of the Adventist Review; 1966–1982	Succeeded by William G. Johnsson
Preceded by William Paul Bradley	Chairperson of the Ellen G. White Estate; 1980–2008	Succeeded by Don Schneider
