= Generation of Youth for Christ =

Adventist organization

Generation of Youth for Christ (GYC)
- Founded: 2002
- Founder: Justin Kim and Israel Ramos
- Type: Religious
- Purpose: Youth and young adults
- Location: Ann Arbor, Michigan
- Region served: World. Conventions in United States
- Method: Annual conventions plus regional conventions
- Key people: Justin McNeilus, President Yamil Rosario, General VP; Sebastien Braxton, Gen. VP Aaron McNulty, Treasurer
- Revenue: $694,244 (2009)
- Volunteers: 75
- Website: www.gycweb.org
- Formerly called: General Youth Conference

Generation of Youth for Christ, formerly the General Youth Conference - not to be mistaken for Adventist Young Professionals (AYP), is an annual conference and expression of Adventist theology and 28 Fundamental Beliefs, which organizes and coordinates Bible studies, online sermons, regional youth conferences, mission trips, global networking opportunities for young people, week of prayers and youth camp meetings. It began with a small group of Korean students studying their Bibles together all night. It developed through middle-of-the-night text-messaging between two university students, one in Massachusetts, the other in California. They decided to call people together for a small conference in the woods of California. At that first conference, held in 2002, 200 people were invited; 400 attended. Since then, the popularity of the conventions has grown, and even the President of the Seventh-day Adventist Church, Ted N. C. Wilson has attended and praise the conventions. It has sermons that have been published in hardcover and the 2010 convention registered 5,100 participants.

== Some of the conferences ==
- 2003, Ann Arbor, Michigan
- 2004, Sacramento, California
- 2010, Baltimore, Maryland

At the 2010 conference, 5,100 people registered from 43 countries. At the main worship service on Saturday, an estimated 6,700 attended. Attendees crowded onto approximately 70 buses on Saturday afternoon, for door-to-door evangelism in and around the city of Baltimore. Many church leaders, including General Conference president Ted Wilson and well-known evangelist Mark Finley, joined the youth for that venture.

== Reception ==
=== Impact ===
The SDA church journal for the Southwestern Union Conference concluded that, as a result of these conferences, "the youth now want to do public evangelism in their own church."

=== Concerns within the church ===
The GYC annual gatherings have generated controversy within the Adventist community, by Progressive Adventists. One of the authors for Spectrum, an independent (liberal) Adventist magazine, wrote, "What I am saying is that emotional, anti-intellectual, conservative movements like GYC don’t accomplish much in the long run in spite of all the hoopla. They are ineffective in achieving their own long-term goals and can be spiritually harmful to the young innocents who blame themselves for delaying the Second Advent." Ervin Taylor, writing for the Progressive Adventist magazine Adventist Today, criticized the movement, challenging claims that GYC is a grass-roots organization, and pointing to tax documents showing GYC is well funded. He also suggested that GYC has a conservative ideology.

=== Improvement in relations with the church ===
After some early painful interactions between the youthful organizers and General Conference officials, both groups have developed a positive relationship with the other. Presenters at the Louisville, Kentucky, 2009 GYC convention included various leaders of the Adventist church: The North American Division ministerial secretary; the director of the Amazing Facts Center of Evangelism; presidents of two divisions of the world field; the Adventist Review editor, and four General Conference vice presidents. Saturday's attendance was estimated at 4,600. The 2010 GYC further demonstrated acceptance by the official Seventh-day Adventist leadership. Ted N. C. Wilson, newly elected President of the Seventh-day Adventist Church, spoke for the Saturday morning service, January 1, 2011.

== Structure and Finances ==
The GYC is a member of the Adventist Laymen's Services and Industries (ASI). As the ASI website explains, "Adventist-laymen’s Services & Industries is a cooperative network of lay individuals, professionals and ministries who share a common commitment to support the global mission of the Seventh-day Adventist Church."

At first they called themselves the General Youth Conference, but this was too much like the Adventist "General Conference". They changed their name, keeping the GYC acronym, to Generation of Youth for Christ. They have their own governing board, and are a registered Michigan-based charity with the United States government.

Their website describes two levels of government, an executive committee and a board of directors. The executive committee is composed of volunteers, who oversee the operation of GYC. They include young professionals, university students, pastors, and Bible workers. The board of directors is made up of older individuals. The stated purpose of GYC is to balance the youthful energy of the executive committee with those who have more years of experience. The current Board of Directors includes three doctors, three conference officials, three pastors, two university professors, a financial analyst, and a law student.

== See also ==
- Seventh-day Adventist Church
- Seventh-day Adventist Church Pioneers
- Seventh-day Adventist eschatology
- Pathfinders
- Adventurers
- Seventh-day Adventist interfaith relations – for relations with other Protestants and Catholics
- Seventh-day Adventist theology
- Seventh-day Adventist worship
