= Amazing Facts =

Seventh-day Adventist evangelistic ministry

- Type: 501(c)(3) Nonprofit organization
- Founded: 1965
- Founder: Joe Crews
- Headquarters: 6615 Sierra College Blvd, Granite Bay, California
- Area served: International
- Key people: Doug Batchelor (President)
- Website: www.amazingfacts.org

Amazing Facts is a nonprofit organization Seventh-day Adventist evangelistic ministry based in Granite Bay, California, which broadcasts daily television programming worldwide. It is based on the teachings of Scripture, with particular focus on the Three Angels' Messages of Revelation 14. Beginning as a radio program dedicated to Christian evangelism, it later expanded to include television and online Bible study ministries.

== History ==
Amazing Facts was founded in 1965 by Joe Crews in Baltimore, Maryland. Inspired by the success of The Rest Of The Story, hosted by Paul Harvey, Joe Crews' original objective for Amazing Facts was to reach out to both Christian and non-Christian listeners via daily 15-minute programs by opening with a scientific or historic fact, and how it applies to the overall Biblical messages. Later, the program offered accompanying home Bible study courses, as well as books written by Crews himself. In 1987, Amazing Facts initiated a television ministry that has expanded to four programs as well as periodic evangelism series.

Shortly before his death in 1994, Crews invited Doug Batchelor to assume the position of president, which he holds to this day. Today, the Amazing Facts radio program "Bible Answers Live" broadcasts mainly out of Granite Bay, California each Sunday evening to about 100 national stations. At the end of 2018, Amazing Facts became an independent ministry and changed its name to Amazing Facts International. It also became a public charity that same year. By 2022, it had offices in China, India, Indonesia, and the Philippines. Amazing Facts International was listed as the sixteenth largest media ministry in the United States by MinistryWatch that same year.

== Media programming ==
Amazing Facts programming is available on a variety of over-the-air, cable and satellite stations In addition, programs are archived on the website.

=== Radio programs ===
- Bible Answers Live - a 60-minute Sunday evening radio program where listeners phone or email Bible questions which are answered live
- Wonders in the Word - 30-minute radio program airing Monday through Thursday

=== Television ===
The ministry carries various programming on television through Internet, mobile devices, various television stations, networks including their Amazing Facts Television Channel.

== Speakers ==
Preceded by founder	Founder/Speaker/Director; Joe Crews; 1965 - 1994	Succeeded by Doug Batchelor
Preceded by Joe Crews	Speaker/Director; Doug Batchelor; 1994 - present	Succeeded by Current

== AFCOE ==
Amazing Facts operates the Amazing Facts Center of Evangelism (AFCOE). "AFCOE trains and equips clergy and lay people in all aspects of evangelistic ministry." Both a four-month "Complete" course and a 4-day "AFCOE To Go" courses are offered from their campus in Rocklin, CA and by request around the world.

== Bible school ==
Amazing Facts offers a free Bible school with online study guides.

Some themes of the studies are "A Love that Transforms", "God Drew the Plans", "God's Free Health Plan", "Purity & Power!", and "Are the Dead Really Dead?".

== Mergers ==
On April 19, 2007, it was announced that Amazing Facts and 3ABN would be merging However, no merger between Amazing Facts and 3ABN ultimately occurred.

On April 6, 2008, Amazing Facts announced a joint venture with Weimar Institute whereby the operations of Weimar Institute will be administered by Amazing Facts and both organizations would have a single board of directors. Weimar was renamed Weimar Center of Health and Education and Neil Nedley was chosen as president.

== See also ==
- List of United States cable and satellite television networks
- Religious broadcasting
