= Josephine Cunnington Edwards =

Seventh-day Adventist author and teacher

- Born: Josephine Thelma Cunnington; August 24, 1904
- Died: August 14, 1993 (aged 88)
- Education: Emmanuel Missionary College; George Peabody College for Teachers
- Occupation: Seventh-day Adventist author

Josephine Cunnington Edwards (1904 – 1993) was a Seventh-day Adventist author, public speaker, and teacher. She published 34 books and numerous articles. Several of her books were inspired by her seven years of missionary service in Africa alongside her husband, Elder Lowell A Edwards. Mrs. Edwards taught English and Speech at teacher training colleges and secondary schools in Georgia, Idaho, California, Alabama, and Malawi. She also wrote three separate scripts for the Ralph Edwards radio-television show, This Is Your Life. It was reported that she was fluent in five languages.

== Background and family ==
Josephine Thelma Cunnington was born in Muncie, Indiana, on August 24, 1904, as the tenth child of her parents David and Elizabeth (Gray) Cunnington. As a child, she was described as having "unusual energy". As a young girl she was said to have "enormous ambition and curiosity", and as a young woman she was described as "very vivacious", "bright as a dollar" and a "real sparkler" – a whirlwind of activity. At the age of 18, she married Lowell Adelbert Edwards on May 27, 1923. The two raised two sons, Robert (1924–2005) who was an author and sang professionally for 24-years with the Voice of Prophecy's King's Heralds quartet and Charles who became an author, evangelist, health educator and departmental leader with youth. In addition Charles wrote a book about his parents entitled Wacifundo and the Whirlwind.

Josephine Cunnington began her writing career in 1934 (age 30) while a college freshman at Broadview College and Theological Seminary in LaGrange, Illinois with her first book, Loom o’ Life. She also had several periodical articles published during the same time. She wrote and spoke under the combined name of Josephine Cunnington Edwards of which she became known. She completed her initial college degree in 1944 (age 40) with a Bachelor's of Arts in History from Emmanuel Missionary College (now Andrews University), in Berrien Springs, Michigan.

Mrs. Edwards was teaching at Oak Park Academy when she and her husband received the call to be missionaries in Africa. The family traveled to Africa to serve as missionaries for seven years where she served as principal of Malamulo Teacher Training College (Nyasaland, Africa) from 1945 to 1952 while her husband was superintendent and taught ministry. Upon their return, they brought with them two African daughters whom they adopted, Alice and Matilda, and an African son named Cameron.

After returning to the states, Josephine was a high school teacher in Ellijay, Georgia from 1957 to 1962; and later taught at Oakwood College, now Oakwood University in Huntsville, Alabama from 1963 to 1964.

In a Walla Walla publication she described how after the early death of her husband in 1962 she was "disconsolate" but found new energy in 1964 after being invited to College Place, Washington for a speaking engagement. After that she began to get more and more speaking requests as the popularity of her books grew and her unusually enthusiastic speaking style caught the attention of children and youth ministers across the United States. In 1964 she was accepted as a history teacher at Gem State Adventist Academy in Caldwell, Idaho.

She went on to receive a master's degree from George Peabody College for Teachers in 1962 (age 57) and continued with postgraduate studies at the University of Southern California. In 1978 (age 74) she was recognized by Andrews University as Alumna of the year and later that same year was awarded an honorary Doctorate of Human Letters degree from the same university "for recognition of her longstanding contributions to Christian literature for young people.”

In the October 20, 1970, issue of the Lake Union Herald it was reported that the “author travels 52 weeks a year on speaking engagements and has made several trips to Europe.” The same article also states that “Fluent in Portuguese, Spanish, and Greek, Mrs. Edwards also can speak the Zulu dialect of Chinyanga.”

Josephine retired in 1969, and bought a little home in College Place, Washington. But alas, a quiet life of retirement was hardly a natural consequence for a whirlwind like she.

Soon she sold her house and moved to Tennessee, where she spent a number of years on the faculty of the Laurelbrook school, a self-supporting academy at Dayton, Tennessee, teaching history and Spanish and she also aided in the giving of some college classes there in affiliation with Southern College (now known as Southern Adventist University).

She left Laurelbrook in 1981 and spent a short time as a chaplain at a nursing home in Pennsylvania. Then she moved into school teaching again, teaching the lower grades in Antioch, California, where her nephew was chairman of the school board.

Finally, in 1984, she moved into retirement in Milton-Freewater, Oregon. But even there, she managed to teach a class in creative writing at a local community college. And she continued to travel far and wide for speaking appointments before her death on August 14, 1993, at the age of 88.

== Books ==
Edwards loved to write and published 34 books. In 1974, the Walla Walla Union-Bulletin newspaper quoted her as saying that her mornings were always saved for writing and that families were her target audience. Her first book, Loom o’ Life, was published in 1934. Her most popular books included The Enchanted Pillowcase, a story about an African orphan named Alice Princess whom Mrs. Edwards "adopted" to save her from a marriage to an old man who offered the most cows as a bride price. Malinki of Malawi is the story of an African sold three times into slavery, once by his own father. Swift Arrow is a story about a young pioneer boy who is captured by Indians and raised as the son of a mighty chief.

28 of her most popular books are listed below

- Loom o' Life, Pacific Press, 1933
- Bricks for Sale, Review and Herald Publishing Association, 1937
- The Enchanted Pillowcase, and Other Stories, Review and Herald Publishing Association, 1953
- Tales from Africa, Southern Publishing Assn, 1956
- On the Porch of the Old Witch, Voice of Prophecy, 1957
- Reuben's Portion, Review and Herald Publishing Association/Southern Publishing Assn, 1957
- Children Can Be Taught, Southern Publishing Assn, 1960
- I Saw Thee Philip, Southern Publishing Assn, 1960
- Lydia; a Seller of Purple, Southern Publishing Assn, 1960
- Unto a Knowledge of the Truth, Review and Herald Publishing Association, 1961
- In Your Steps; Manners for Children and the Power of Parental Example, Review and Herald Publishing Association, 1963
- These Commandments Are Mine, Southern Publishing Assn, 1963
- Wings of Faith, Southern Publishing Assn, 1964
- Kamwendo, Southern Publishing Assn, 1966
- Pioneers Together; a Biography of Roy F. Cottrells, Southern Publishing Assn, 1967
- Sibande and Other Stories, Pacific Press Publishing Association, 1967
- Swift Arrow, Pacific Press Publishing Association, 1967
- And I John Saw, Southern Publishing Assn, 1969
- A Light Shining in Cornwall, Southern Publishing Assn, 1969
- And I John Saw, Southern Publishing Assn, 1969
- Secret in the Hayloft, and Other Stories, Southern Publishing Assn, 1969
- Johnnie, Come Home, Review and Herald Publishing Association, 1969
- Son of Vikings, Southern Publishing Assn, 1972
- The Egg Money Book: And Other Stories, Leaves-of-Autumn Books, 1976
- Malinki of Malawi, Pacific Press Publishing Association, 1978
- With An Holy Calling, Pacific Press Publishing Association, 1979
- Faded Love (Formerly Titled Unto a Knowledge of the Truth), Review and Herald Publishing Association, 1989
- Teaching Old Fashioned Values to New Fashioned Kids, Review and Herald Publishing Association, 1992

One year after the author's death in 1993, her son Charles E Edwards wrote and published a book about the life of his parents:

- Wacifundo and the Whirlwind: the story of Lowell and Josephine Cunnington Edwards, Charles G Edwards, Wenatchee, Wash, 1994

== See also ==
- Seventh-day Adventist Church
- Adventism
