= Henry Feyerabend =

Canadian evangelist

Henry Feyerabend (1931 – December 12, 2006) was a Canadian Seventh-day Adventist evangelist, singer, and author, who is best known in Canada for his work with It Is Written, and in Brazil as a singer with the Arautos do Rei (Portuguese: King's Heralds).

== Biography ==
Henry Feyerabend Jr. was born in Jersey City, New Jersey, to a German father and the daughter of German immigrants to Canada. Both of his parents were devout Seventh-day Adventists. He was the youngest of three children. At the age of four, his family moved to Waldheim, Saskatchewan, where his mother had been born.

In Saskatchewan Feyerabend met a preacher uncle who quickly became a favourite of his; this uncle would later inspire Henry to follow in his footsteps. Another inspiration Henry cited was the Voice of Prophecy radio broadcasts, where Henry became acquainted with H. M. S. Richards and The King's Heralds.

Feyerabend went to Canadian Union College where he took the first three years of a degree in Theology. While there he sang as part of a men's quartet that represented the school. After his third year, he ran out of money and took a teaching position in Saskatoon, where he met his wife, Emma Martin. They were married in 1953. The following year he took a combined teaching and pastoral position in Massachusetts, which he spent two years. He then completed his education at Atlantic Union College while pastoring a church to pay his way. While pastoring that church he got his first opportunity to preach a weekly radio show.

=== Brazil ===
After Feyerabend finished his degree, he received an offer in 1958 from the General Conference to go to Brazil, which he accepted. He and his wife travelled to Brazil by boat, arriving in São Paulo. His first post was as a departmental secretary in Florianópolis, Santa Catarina. Feyerabend spent his first few months adapting to the culture and learning Portuguese in São Paulo, before travelling on to Florianópolis. While in Florianópolis Feyerabend held a number of evangelistic meetings, a tradition he would continue for much of the rest of his life.

In 1962, Feyerabend received a call from the Voz da Profecia, inviting him to start a men's quartet for their radio program. This quartet was named the Arautos do Rei, mimicking the name of the Voice of Prophecy's male quartet in America, The King's Heralds. The Voice of Prophecy was led by Pastor Roberto Rabello, and the quartet followed him all around Brazil as he held evangelistic meetings. While Feyerabend was on furlough in Los Angeles, he heard a new spiritual called I'll be There in the Morn'n. Henry brought the music back with him to Brazil, where another member of the quartet, Joel Sarli, translated the lyrics into Portuguese and called the translated song Alvorada. The song instantly became a hit—thousands of records were sold within the first month, and twenty years later it remained a best-seller. The Voz da Profecia and the Arautos do Rei remained popular for many years afterwards, attracting overflow crowds everywhere they went. While working with the Voice of Prophecy, Henry's daughter Judy was born.

In 1967, Feyerabend left the Voice of Prophecy to become a full-time evangelist for the South Brazil Union. He stayed in this position for two years, holding evangelistic meetings in places like Anápolis and Rio de Janeiro.

=== Return to Canada ===
In 1969, Henry Feyerabend got a call to serve as music coordinator for an evangelistic series in Toronto held by George Vandeman and the It Is Written team, which he accepted. The stay in Toronto soon became permanent; while working on the evangelistic series, Iracy Botelho, a Brazilian pianist who Feyerabend had brought with him discovered that Toronto had a sizeable Portuguese community. Through her and Feyerabend's efforts, an Adventist Portuguese speaking church was established in Toronto. They also began airing the Voz da Profecia radio broadcasts on a Toronto radio station.

In 1971, Feyerabend attended Andrews University where he received a Master of Arts degree. After finishing in 1972, he returned to Toronto to continue his work among the Portuguese community. The next year in 1973, he started a Portuguese-language television show on City TV. It started as a five-minute segment of a much larger Portuguese show, before evolving into Destiny, a half-hour show on Sunday evenings. This broadcast would continue until the mid-80s.

=== It Is Written ===
In the early 1990s, It Is Written expanded to Brazil and asked Feyerabend to assist them. The contacts made during this time led to Mark Finley inviting Henry to become the director of It Is Written Canada. It Is Written was soon nationally televised weekly in Canada, with Feyerabend as preacher. Under Pastor Feyerabend's direction, It Is Written grew into a program that was seen by over two million Canadians.

=== Satellite evangelism ===
In 2000 Feyerabend returned to Brazil to conduct a satellite evangelism series called Esperança 2000 together with Joel Sarli, who had sung with Henry in the Arautos do Rei quartet. From Vila Formosa in São Paulo to over 4000 downlink sites in Brazil, Portugal, and other Portuguese communities around the world, Pastor Feyerabend preached over several weeks. Over 350,000 people attended this program nightly, and at the conclusion of the series several thousand people were baptized.

After returning to Canada after the Brazilian meetings, Feyerabend began working with his assistant pastor for the It Is Written telecasts Shawn Boonstra to attempt to do a similar series in Canada. The series was titled Revelation Speaks Peace and occurred in October and November 2002. The uplink site was Dalhousie University in Halifax, and over 600 sites across the world broadcast the series nightly. Due to a bout with cancer shortly before the series began, Pastor Feyerabend was not able to speak as much as he wanted to during the series, turning the pulpit over most nights to Shawn Boonstra.

=== Retirement and death ===
In 2000 Feyerabend discovered a cancerous lump on his leg. He underwent chemotherapy and three surgeries and the doctors told him he was cancer-free.

Shortly after the Revelation Speaks Peace meetings, he retired from It Is Written Canada, while still making occasional appearances on the television show and retaining some influence behind the scenes. Shawn Boonstra succeeded him as director, and was quickly promoted to be the director of It Is Written International. Bill Santos was then chosen to run It Is Written Canada.

In 2004, the cancer reoccurred, and doctors were forced to amputate Feyerabend's leg. After the amputation, Feyerabend boarded a plane for Calgary, where he preached a sermon the next day. The cancer eventually killed him on December 12, 2006, at the age of 75. He was buried in Waldheim, Saskatchewan.

== Literary career ==
During his life Henry Feyerabend either authored or co-authored over 40 published books. A list of his books follows.

- So Many Religions! Why? (1984)
- God's World (1986)
- Tearing the Shroud from the Antichrist (1986)
- Living Lies About Death and the Hereafter (1987)
- Who is Michael? (1988)
- An Evangelist Answers 101 Most Asked Questions (1988)
- Brazilian Bonaventure (1989)
- Revelation Verse by Verse (1989)
- Slices of Life: Soul-warming Tales that Warm the Heart (1995)
- Galatians Verse by Verse (1997)
- Daniel Verse by Verse (2002)
- Born to Preach (2005)
- The Return (2002), Co-authored with Shawn Boonstra
