= Morris Venden =

Seventh-day Adventist minister and author

Morris L. Venden
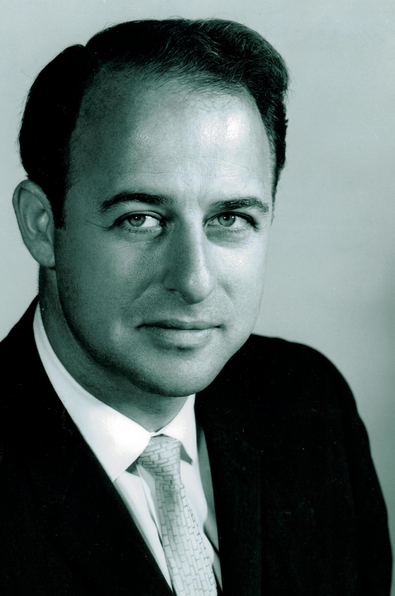
- Church: Seventh-day Adventist

Personal details
- Born: April 5, 1932; Portland, Oregon
- Died: February 10, 2013 (aged 80); College Place, Washington
- Parents: Melvin and Ivy Ruth Venden
- Spouse: Marilyn Venden
- Children: Lee Venden, Lynn Venden, and LuAnn Venden
- Education: Pacific Union College

Morris L. Venden (April 5, 1932 – February 10, 2013) was a Seventh-day Adventist preacher, teacher, and author, who was also a member of the Voice of Prophecy team as an associate speaker.

== Biography ==
Venden was born to Melvin Venden and Ivy Ruth Venden. He graduated from Fresno Adventist Academy in 1949, and received a degree from Pacific Union College, as well as several honorary degrees. He died on February 10, 2013, in College Place, Washington succumbing to FTD (Frontotemporal Dementia), a rare form of dementia.

He pastored several large Seventh-day Adventist churches such as the La Sierra University Church and Pacific Union College Church on the campus of Pacific Union College in California, and Union College Church in Nebraska. Later he pastored the Azure Hills Seventh-day Adventist Church near Loma Linda, California, from which he retired in August, 1998.

Venden then joined the Voice of Prophecy team as an associate speaker. As well as appearing on Voice of Prophecy radio broadcasts, he was also a popular speaker at both national and international Seventh-day Adventist church events.

One source described him as a "master" of the art of preaching amongst Seventh-day Adventists.

Venden was married to Marilyn, and together they ministered mostly to students and young professionals.

Venden was a strong advocate of both justification and sanctification by faith alone. He also was a strong supporter of the Pillars of Seventh-day Adventism including the investigative judgment. He is remembered for his parables and dry humor. As a young minister he was deeply influenced by H. M. S. Richards Sr., the founder of the Voice of Prophecy radio program.

== Publications ==
Venden wrote for a Seventh-day Adventist church membership audience and published more than 30 books. Many discuss theological issues and their application in a person's life. These books were not peer-reviewed and were published by non-academic, Seventh-day Adventist church publishing houses.

- 1978, Salvation By Faith & Your Will. Southern Publishing. ISBN 0-8127-0190-9
- 1979, From Exodus To Advent. Southern Publishing. ISBN 0-8127-0255-7
- 1980, Faith that works, (Daily Devotional), Review and Herald
- 1982, Good News and Bad News about the Judgment, Pacific Press. ISBN 0-8163-0484-X
- 1982, How to Make Christianity Real
- 1982, The Pillars, Pacific Press
- 1982, The Return of Elijah, Pacific Press
- 1983, Obedience of Faith, Review and Herald.
- 1983, To Know God: A 5-Day Plan. Review and Herald. ISBN 0-8280-0220-7
- 1984, Common Ground, Review and Herald.
- 1984, Uncommon Ground, Review and Herald.
- 1984, Higher Ground, Review and Herald.
- 1984, What Jesus Said About ...., Pacific Press
- 1986, How Jesus Treated People, Pacific Press. ISBN 0-8163-0621-4
- 1986, Parables of the Kingdom, Pacific Press
- 1986, Your Friend, the Holy Spirit, Pacific Press
- 1987, How to Know God's Will in Your Life. Pacific Press. ISBN 0-8163-0719-9
- 1987, 95 Theses on Righteousness by Faith. Pacific Press. ISBN 0-8163-1954-5
- 1988, Here I Come, Ready Or Not. Pacific Press. ISBN 0-8163-0733-4
- 1991, Hard to Be Lost, Pacific Press
- 1992, Love God and Do as You Please. Pacific Press. ISBN 0-8163-1089-0
- 1993, God Says, But I Think. Pacific Press. ISBN 0-8163-1137-4
- 1994, Modern Parables. Pacific Press. ISBN 0-8163-1196-X
- 1995, The Last Trolley Out. Pacific Press. ISBN 0-936785-92-6
- 1996, Never Without an Intercessor, Pacific Press, Update of Good News and Bad News about the Judgment
- 1996, It's Who You Know. Pacific Press. ISBN 0-904748-46-4
- 1999, Faith That Works. Review and Herald. ISBN 0-8280-1435-3
- 2005, Why Didn't They Tell Me?: Sharing Jesus Isn't Something We Do, It's Who We Are. Pacific Press. ISBN 0-8163-2080-2
- More About Jesus Seminar, vol. 1., vol. 2., and vol. 3., DVD with his son Lee Venden.

== See also ==
- Seventh-day Adventist Church
- Seventh-day Adventist theology
- Seventh-day Adventist eschatology
- History of the Seventh-day Adventist Church
- 28 Fundamental Beliefs
- Questions on Doctrine
- Teachings of Ellen G. White
- Inspiration of Ellen G. White
- Prophecy in the Seventh-day Adventist Church
- Investigative judgment
- Pillars of Adventism
- Second Coming
- Conditional Immortality
- Historicism
- Three Angels' Messages
- Sabbath in seventh-day churches
- Ellen G. White
- Adventism
- Seventh-day Adventist Church Pioneers
- Seventh-day Adventist worship
