= Nathan Brown (writer) =

Australian writer

Nathan G. Brown (born c. 1974) is a Christian author and editor. Brown is the "book editor" for Signs Publishing Company, based near Melbourne, Victoria, Australia.

From 2003, he was editor of the magazines Signs of the Times, an Australian Christian magazine with a similar format to Reader's Digest; Record, the newsmagazine for the Seventh-day Adventist Church in the South Pacific; and the Edge. He has written articles for a broad variety of magazines internationally, and has written or been the editing author of six or more books. He has won several awards for his writing. Former Adventist Review editor Bill Johnsson has described him as the best writer in the Adventist church.

He has degrees in law, English, and literature.

== Biography ==
Brown has degrees in law, English and literature. In around 1999, he won a writing contest.

He worked for Signs Publishing Company as a reporter for the Record. He received an internship with the Adventist Review where he worked for six months. He received an honorable mention from the United States Associated Church Press for his article "Unfinished Work" in the Adventist Review world edition.

Brown was appointed chief editor of the Signs Publishing Company in 2003, believed to be its youngest editor ever; and moved from Townsville in northern Queensland to Victoria and the office of Signs Publishing Company.

He wrote a regular column for the Adventist Review for four years from 2003 till 2006, and has also had columns in Edge, and Signs of the Times. He has also had columns with other Christian magazines, and published other pieces.

Brown/Record received the "Best editorial/opinion piece" award from the Australasian Religious Press Association (ARPA) on 4 October 2008. The award was for Brown's editorial "The 'family' myth" which critiqued the "family values" rhetoric of politicians, and appeared in Record just prior to the 2007 federal election. The judges commented,

"What a pity we didn’t hear more of this kind of thing during the election campaign, when the phrase 'family values' was being tossed about in into almost every speech and discussion. Nathan Brown, in examining what this nebulous term really means, urges us to see it in a larger perspective, as going beyond the nuclear family and into the wider world. He also points out something preachers and teachers often forget, that Jesus was very far from being a family man in the narrow Western sense. A brave and original point of view."

He is studying towards a doctorate in English from James Cook University about the possibilities of God in postmodern literature. His hobbies include reading and writing, playing basketball, making radio, and growing flowers. He is married to Angela, with whom he supports sponsor children in several countries.

== Publications ==
Brown has published many articles and several books, including:

- Relevation (Victoria, Australia: Signs, 2006); ISBN 1-921292-00-8; website
- 7 Reasons Life is Better With God Autumn House (Review and Herald), 2007; ISBN 978-0-8127-0436-5; distributor's website
- Nemesis Train (Sydney, Australia: Ark House, 2008); ISBN 978-0-9805414-0-3; publisher's page; blog
- Pastor George: The Story of the First Aboriginal Adventist Pastor (Australia: Australian Union Conference of Seventh-day Adventists, 2010); ISBN 978-0-646-53284-4. A biography of George Quinlin

Compiler and editor of:

- Ordinary People – Extraordinary God: Real-life Stories of Faith and Commitment (Victoria, Australia: Signs, 2005); ISBN 1-876010-85-1
- Ordinary People – Faithful God: More Stories of Faith and Commitment (Victoria, Australia: Signs, 2007); ISBN 1-921292-10-5
- Ordinary People – Generous God: More Stories of Faith and Commitment (Victoria, Australia: Signs, 2010)

Chapters in the "Australian Stories" series of books:

- "Does God Watch Football?", p132–34 in Australian Stories for the Heart (Sydney: Strand, 2002)
- Chapter in Australian Stories for the Spirit (Sydney, New South Wales: Strand, 2003); ISBN 1-876825-10-3
- "Locked In", p90–92; "The Finch", p192–194; "A Postcard of Grace", p238–240 in Inspirational Australian Stories ed. David and Rachel Dixon (Sydney: Strand, 2004)
- "The Art of Tipping", p3–6 of Australian Stories of Life ed. David and Rachel Dixon (Sydney: Strand, 2005)

== See also ==
- Signs Publishing Company
- Signs of the Times (Australia)
- Record (magazine)
- Seventh-day Adventist Church
- Seventh-day Adventist theology
- Seventh-day Adventist eschatology
- History of the Seventh-day Adventist Church
- Teachings of Ellen White
- Inspiration of Ellen White
- Prophecy in the Seventh-day Adventist Church
- Investigative judgment
- The Pillars of Adventism
- Second Advent
- Baptism by Immersion
- Conditional Immortality
- Historicism
- Three Angels' Messages
- End times
- Sabbath in Seventh-day Adventism
- Ellen G. White
- Adventist
- Seventh-day Adventist worship
