= Sabbath School (Seventh-day Adventist) =

Bible study practiced by Seventh-day Adventists

Sabbath school as conducted by Seventh-day Adventists is distinguished from other Christian Sabbath Schools by significant adult participation and being held on Saturday.

Sabbath School occurs on Saturday in the Seventh-day Adventist Church, consistent with other Seventh-day Sabatatarian churches (such as the Seventh Day Baptists and Church of God).

== Description ==
Adult church members are provided with the Adult Bible Study Guide (formerly known as Sabbath School Quarterly) issued four times a year. It is also known as the "Quarterly" and the "Lesson". It is published by Pacific Press Publishing Association. Sabbath school quarterlies are Bible study guides that cover a specific topic or book of the Bible every quarter. The quarterly is designed to be read during the week, so that during Sabbath School, the class members are ready to discuss questions and topics raised in that lesson in small groups. The adult Sabbath school always has a heavy focus on the Bible. All Seventh-day Adventists around the world use the same Sabbath school quarterly, translated into the necessary languages (with a few exceptions such as Germany, where members cover the same topic with different material). As of 2012 the editor of the adult Sabbath school lessons was Clifford Goldstein.

At the same time as the adult study, children attend classes for their age group. Typical age group divisions are Beginner (infants), Kindergarten (K), Primary (Grades 1-3), Junior (Grades 4-6), Earliteen (Grades 7-8), Youth (High School), and Inverse (College and Young Adult). Each age division has its own specific quarterly, which is titled by the class name up to Primary. Juniors and Earliteens often share the same quarterly entitled PowerPoints. Some Earliteen groups use a separate publication entitled Real Time Faith. Youth use either Cornerstone Connections or InVerse. Some churches give the children a weekly magazine at the close of Sabbath school. Kindergarten receives Our Little Friend, Primary receives Primary Treasure, Juniors and Earliteens receive Guide, and the Youth receive Insight.

On the last Sabbath of the quarter, or the 13th Sabbath, a special collection is taken for a missionary project. During the 13th Sabbath Program, youngsters may present a music or acting special based on the subject learned that quarter or explain the traditions and dress in the attire of the countries or world regions which offerings collected will benefit. Communion service preceded by foot-washing may take place on or right after the 13th Sabbath.

A 2002 worldwide survey of local church leaders estimated that 67% of Adventists, including 63% of under-18s, "attend Sabbath School nearly every week".

== See also ==
- Seventh-day Adventist worship
- Sabbath in seventh-day churches
