= Arthur Patrick =

Australian historian and theologian

Arthur Nelson Patrick

Personal details
- Born: 23 February 1934 Avondale Road, Cooranbong, NSW Australia
- Died: 8 March 2013 (aged 79) Sydney Adventist Hospital
- Occupation: Protestant, Seventh-day Adventist Theologian

Arthur Nelson Patrick (23 February 1934 – 8 March 2013) was a Seventh-day Adventist theologian and historian. At the time of death, he was an honorary senior research fellow at Avondale College in New South Wales, Australia. He also worked in pastoral ministry, evangelism, religion teaching, academic administration, and hospital chaplaincy for the Seventh-day Adventist church.

== Biography ==
Patrick graduated from Avondale College with a Bachelor of Arts (BA) in theology in 1957; then from the Seventh-day Adventist Theological Seminary at Andrews University with a Master of Arts (MA) and Master of Divinity (M.Div.) in 1972; followed by a Doctor of Ministry (D.Min.: Biblical Studies) from the Christian Theological Seminary in 1973.

From 1976 till 1983 he was the founding director of the Ellen G. White/Seventh-day Adventist Research Centre, located within the Avondale College library and jointly funded by the South Pacific Division of the Adventist church and the Ellen G. White Estate.

Patrick graduated with a Master of Letters (MLitt: Themes in the History of Women and Family) from the University of New England in Australia during 1984, and a Doctor of Philosophy (PhD) from the University of Newcastle, Australia, in 1992.

From 1992 until 1996 Patrick was the senior chaplain at the Sydney Adventist Hospital. During the following two academic years he was a visiting lecturer at La Sierra University in Southern California, teaching church history and pastoral ministry.

Patrick's writings attempt, in particular, to survey Adventist Studies (including study of the life and writings of Ellen Gould White, 1827–1915).

Patrick officially retired in 1998, whence one writer in Adventist Heritage magazine praised him for his contribution to the Seventh-day Adventist Church, adding Patrick's coworkers "will miss his warmth and his droll wit as well.". In retirement he served as chair of the Professional Standards Committee for the South Pacific Division; chair of Women in Ministry, Incorporated; and as a research fellow at Avondale College. He was active in writing and publishing and was a presenter at the 50th Anniversary Conference on the book Questions on Doctrine, held at Andrews University from 24 to 27 October 2007.

== Publications ==
Patrick wrote for a Seventh-day Adventist audience and published on his site as well as written chapters in books and articles for a range of Seventh-day Adventist magazines, including: Record, Signs of the Times, Ministry, Adventist Review, Adventist Heritage, Adventist Professional, Spectrum: The Journal of the Association of Adventist Forums, Adventist Today, Church Heritage, Lucas: An Evangelical History Review, and the academic journal Journal of Religious History.

=== Books ===
- Christianity and Culture in Colonial Australia: Selected Catholic, Anglican, Wesleyan and Adventist Perspectives, 1981-1900 (Sydney: Fast Books, 1993). PhD dissertation
- The San: A Century of Christian Caring, 1903-2003 (Warburton: Signs Publishing Company, 2003); a centennial history of Sydney Adventist Hospital

== See also ==
- Seventh-day Adventist Church
- Seventh-day Adventist theology
- Seventh-day Adventist eschatology
- History of the Seventh-day Adventist Church
- 28 Fundamental Beliefs
- Questions on Doctrine
- Teachings of Ellen G. White
- Inspiration of Ellen G. White
- Prophecy in the Seventh-day Adventist Church
- Investigative judgment
- Pillars of Adventism
- Second Coming
- Conditional Immortality
- Historicism
- Three Angels' Messages
- Sabbath in seventh-day churches
- Ellen G. White
- Adventist Review
- Adventism
- Seventh-day Adventist Church Pioneers
- Seventh-day Adventist worship
- Adventist Heritage Ministry
- Avondale College
- Ellen G. White Estate
