= Wayne Hooper =

Wayne H. Hooper
- Born: Wayne H. Hooper; July 4, 1920
- Died: February 27, 2007 (aged 86)
- Genre: Gospel Music
- Occupations: Singer, musician, composer, arranger, minister
- Years active: 1940s–2007

Wayne Hillard Hooper (July 4, 1920 – February 27, 2007) was widely known as a gospel music composer, arranger and as a singer in the King's Heralds quartet for the Voice of Prophecy radio program.

During his prolific career he produced nine volumes of gospel hymn vocal arrangements, and a number of solo songs and choral music. The Hooper style arrangements of male quartet music performed by the King's Heralds were widely copied throughout the world. Approximately 100 of his arrangements are now in the public domain and are available online.

His best known song, "We Have This Hope," was created as the theme song for the 1962 Seventh-day Adventist General Conference Session in San Francisco. The song was used again as the theme song for the General Conference sessions of 1966, 1975, 1995 and 2000 and has been translated into numerous languages.

Hooper traveled widely with the King's Heralds throughout the United States and Canada, as well as tours to Central and South America, the Caribbean, and Europe. He sang in several languages used by Voice of Prophecy affiliates around the world. Known as Los Heraldos del Rey in Spanish, the quartet was also featured regularly on La Voz de la Esperanza, a Spanish-language Seventh-day Adventist radio ministry.

== Biography ==
Wayne Hooper was born in Little Rock, Arkansas, on July 4, 1920, as the child of a chorister and voice teacher. He received his high school diploma from Gem State Academy, Caldwell, Idaho.

After completing an associate of arts degree in music at Southern California Junior College (now La Sierra University, Riverside), he taught music at Portland Adventist Academy, was a soloist for The Quiet Hour radio broadcast, and was a singing evangelist for the Potomac Conference of Seventh-day Adventists.

He joined the King's Heralds quartet as baritone at the Voice of Prophecy in 1943. After 4 years he moved to Lincoln, Nebraska, where he continued his music education, completing his bachelor's degree in 1947 at Union College.

Returning to the Voice of Prophecy in 1949, he became part of a quartet consisting of Hooper, Bob Edwards, Bob Seamount and Jerry Dill that performed together until 1962. Following the King's Herald's he continued his service at the Voice of Prophecy as music director, producer of the Sunday radio broadcast, and trust services director until his retirement in 1980.

Hooper earned a master's degree in composition, choral conducting, and radio broadcasting at Occidental College Los Angeles and was awarded honorary doctor of music degrees by Andrews University and La Sierra University.

Hooper was married to Harriet Schwender in 1941 and had four children. He was ordained as a Seventh-day Adventist minister in 1955. He and his wife operated Key Music Company publishing music arrangements and books sent worldwide to customers.

During retirement Hooper continued actively in music until his death on February 27, 2007, in Newbury Park, California. He was musical co-editor of the 1985 Seventh-day Adventist Hymnal as well as a companion volume (ISBN 978-0-8280-0425-1) giving the history of the 695 selections and composers. More recently he spent many months restoring and transferring to CDs, the original reel-to-reel recordings of music by the King's Heralds, Del Delker, and other Voice of Prophecy musicians. A special project that he continued until a few months before his death was setting Bible verses to music to aid children in memorization.

== Online music repository ==
The family of Wayne Hooper has made his original compositions and arrangements of public domain music available on a web site repository at http://www.vop.com/hoopermusic. This repository includes his six quartet books, more than 300 Bible memory verse compositions and over 1,000 unpublished works used during recording sessions by Del Delker, the King's Heralds and other soloists and groups.

== See also ==
- King's Heralds
- Seventh-day Adventist Church
- Voice of Prophecy
