= Review Youth Canvassing =

Seventh-Day Adventist church media

Review Youth Canvassing was one of many local programs in which Seventh-Day Adventist youth members engage in canvassing and door-to-door sales of materials developed by the Review and Herald Publishing Association, which later merged with Pacific Press. The materials sold are usually “magabooks,” and groups like Review Youth Canvassing are categorized as Magabook Programs, which still exist today. These youth programs are separate from the Seventh-Day Adventist Literature Evangelist programs.

== History ==
Magabook Programs are a form of colportage. Ellen G. White supported canvassing.

== Activities ==
Review Youth Canvassing, like other Magabook Programs, involved youth going door-to-door selling Seventh-Day Adventist written materials and engaging in discussions about their beliefs. These programs often highlights benefits such as developing essential life skills like communication and team work. Additionally, the sales generated from these programs may help offset the cost of attending Seventh-Day Adventist private schools.
