= Sabbath School (disambiguation) =

- Sabbath School, Saturday pre-service lessons for a congregation of seventh-day Christian denominations
- Sunday school, Christian religious school sessions for children held on Sundays, and known by some denominations as Sabbath School.
- Hebrew school, Jewish religious school sessions for children, sometimes held on the Sabbath and then known as Sabbath School.
- Sabbath School (Seventh-day Adventist), Sabbath School in the Seventh-day Adventist Church
