= Del Delker =

American contralto sacred music vocalist (1924 - 2018)

Ardella V. Delker (October 21, 1924 – January 31, 2018) was an American contralto sacred music female vocalist who sang on the Voice of Prophecy radio ministry beginning in 1947.

== Biography ==
Delker was born in Java, South Dakota, in 1924. She started singing informally at a young age, such as an incident when she was three years old, when she became separated from her parents and started singing in front of the local bank; people passing by offered her money for her performance. When she was seven, her mother, by now separated from her father, moved to California with Del and her brother. Her mother was a Seventh-day Adventist, and sent Del to an Adventist school for grades 5 through 8, but Del was not interested in the church, preferring to sing popular music, and volunteering to sing to the armed forces.

After attending a series of meetings held by The Quiet Hour in March 1947, she joined the Seventh-day Adventist Church, and immediately began singing for The Quiet Hour. That summer she was invited to join the Voice of Prophecy, as a secretary and a singer for their radio broadcasts. She said no three times, because she had no formal musical training and could not read music; and also because she intended to attend college that fall. However, the fourth time she was asked, she accepted.

In 1951, she was recorded for the first time, on a record that featured the King's Heralds male quartet. At the Voice of Prophecy she also had the opportunity to work with famous Seventh-day Adventist composer Wayne Hooper, who wrote many arrangements for her. In 1953, she finally made it to college, at first attending Emmanuel Missionary College, and later transferring to La Sierra College in order to continue singing with the Voice of Prophecy. She graduated in 1958 with a degree in religion with an emphasis in counselling.

Delker recorded over forty albums for Chapel Records since the early 1950s. Among the songs she is best known for are "The Love of God", "Ten Thousand Angels", and "The Night Watch". In addition to her scores of recordings in English, she has also recorded several gospel albums in Spanish and Portuguese, recording songs in 15 languages in total, as well as religious music for children.

Delker toured the world with Voice of Prophecy revivals and performed in many nations, often singing Christian hymns in the native languages. She sang frequently with the King's Heralds, and at meetings led by H.M.S. Richards. She also sang frequently for the Voice of Prophecy radio broadcasts. Due to her involvement with Adventist radio and television ministries, Del Delker became one of the most well-known musicians with the Seventh-day Adventist church. After the Voice of Prophecy music department was disbanded in 1982, she continued to sing for their broadcasts, and also sang for the Faith for Today television broadcast. She officially retired in 1990, but continued to sing and record albums in her retirement.

She was a good friend of composer Hugh Martin who she collaborated with in the 1980s and the 1990s, and who served as her accompanist, and he later penned a new version of his Christmas song "Have Yourself a Merry Little Christmas" entitled "Have Yourself A Blessed Little Christmas", which Delker recorded in 1999. In 2002, she released her autobiography, Del Delker: Her Story, co-written by Ken Wade and published by Pacific Press.

Delker's last performance was in 2007, at the age of 82, for the funeral of her long-time collaborator Wayne Hooper. She died on January 31, 2018, in Porterville, California. Upon her death, Ted Wilson, President of the Seventh-day Adventist Church, released the following statement: "When we get to heaven, we will meet many people who were not only blessed by Del's voice but were influenced by her Christ-centered singing to make a decision to follow Jesus."

== Selected discography ==
Del Delker released music almost exclusively through Chapel Records, the official music label of the Seventh-day Adventist Church.

Year	Album	Chapel Records Catalog No.
c. 1951	Del Delker	
c. 1952	Del Delker Sings	LP 603
c. 1953	The La Sierra University Album	
c. 1954	Del Delker and Bob Seamount	
c. 1954	Del Delker and the King's Heralds	
c. 1955	Del Delker Sings in The Temple Trio	
c. 1956	It Took a Miracle	
c. 1960	God Understands	
c. 1961	Day By Day	LP 5011
c. 1962	Our Prayer	
c. 1963	The Love of God	LP 5043
c. 1963	The Lord's Prayer	LP 5065
c. 1964	It Took a Miracle (different album than 1956)	
c. 1965	Ten Thousand Angels	LP 5093
c. 1966	What Will it Be to See Jesus	LP 5104
c. 1967	My God is a Real God	LP 5118
c. 1968	Joyful	LP 5125
c. 1969	The Night Watch	LP 5145
c. 1969	Del Delker Sings the Good Old Songs	S 5168
c. 1970	He Touched Me	S5184
c. 1970	He Touched Me (Spanish-language version of album)	
c. 1972	Migrating Birds	S 5201
c. 1974	Hallelujah, Home at Last!	S 5243
c. 1975	Never Give Up!	S 5266
1976	Come on Down	S 5291
1977	Quiet Time with Del	S 5313
1979	Reflections	S 5356
1980	Being Me (Songs for Children)	C 7014
c. 1980	All About Love	
c. 1981	Songs for Happy Children	S 7007
c. 1981	On His Mind	
c. 1983	Worship Time: Hymns and Classics	
c. 1985	Most Requested Songs	
c. 1990	His Love	
1993	Heaven on My Mind	
c. 1995	Forever Grateful	
c. 1997	40th Anniversary Album	
c. 1999	There's No One Quite Like You	
2001	Have Yourself A Blessed Christmas	
