= Guide (magazine) =

- A 2005 issue of Guide magazine
- Editor: Randy Fishell
- Categories: Christian - Seventh-day Adventist
- Frequency: Weekly
- Publisher: Pacific Press Publishing Association
- Total circulation: 30,000
- First issue: October 7, 1953
- Country: United States
- Language: English
- Website: www.guidemagazine.org
- ISSN: 0017-5226

Guide magazine is a Seventh-day Adventist weekly periodical published by Pacific Press Publishing Association. It is a Christian story magazine that uses true stories to illustrate Bible passages and is targeted to 10- to 14-year-old youth.

Guide is often distributed to "Earliteen" and "Junior" Sabbath School students at the end of class and provides a Bible study guide for the week. Since its beginning, Guide has been popular reading during the church service for young people.

The magazine is published in a 32-page full-color 6x8" format.

== History ==
Junior Guide magazine from December 4, 1963

In the years following World War II, the Adventist church had two magazines for children – Our Little Friend for children preschool to preteen and Youth's Instructor for older teenagers. A magazine for junior-age youth was originally proposed at the 1951 Autumn Council of the Seventh-day Adventist Church and voted in Spring Council on April 9, 1952, designating the Review and Herald as the publisher. A relatively young 27-year-old pastor from Northern California, Lawrence Maxwell became the first editor.

The magazine was announced in an ad in the Youth's Instructor in 1953 promising a magazine "Packed with stories, pictures, games, puzzles, camp craft, Junior Sabbath School lessons, and interesting Pathfinder activity" in a 16-page weekly publication. A contest to decide the name of the magazine was advertised in the Youth's Instructor magazine and drew 16,000 entries. Of those entries 225 suggested Junior Guide which became the original name of the magazine.

At the launch of the magazine, there were complaints that it looked much like Youth's Instructor. Another complaint was that the margins were too wide. In January 1953 the format of the magazine was changed to a smaller size, page margins were reduced and the number of pages increased to 24 per issue.

Beginning in 1954 color ink was used for three issues a month. The entire magazine would be printed in green, brown or blue tint, including the illustrations. The magazine included a steady formula of stories of worldwide missionary activities, crafts, stories of inventions, conversions and life lessons. The magazine cover always included a photo of children engaging in wholesome activities reflecting the times. Subscriptions reached 28,000 after one year and 43,000 after 10 years.

With the segmentation of the church into "junior" and "earliteen" divisions the name of the magazine was changed from Junior Guide to Guide as of January 1, 1964 and it was focused on elementary school grades 7–8.

With the changing times of the 1960s and 1970s and the advent of a new editor, the Guide changed also. Multi-ethnic images in non-mission stories were featured as well as placed on the cover of the magazine. Stories against racial prejudice and segregation appeared and circulation reached a record of 60,000 subscriptions, based partly on the demise of the Youth's Instructor. By this time the magazine had expanded to 32 pages.

In the 1980s a new feature was introduced – Guidelines question and answer column written by Madeline Johnson. Another introduction was the "Guide Dog" mascot who first appeared in 1985 at the international Pathfinder camporee in Colorado and since at campmeetings, camporees and conventions where Guide readers congregate.

At least one predatory incident in the 1990s put an end to a four-decade Guide tradition of penpals. Circulation also began to decline during this period.

In 2000 Guide switched to a four-color format as production costs declined and circulation began increasing. During 2002–2003 Guide celebrated its 50th anniversary.

Authors for the Guide range from church workers to housewives and come from all parts of the world. They are devout Christians, including Baptists, Presbyterians, Episcopalians, Roman Catholics, and Seventh-day Adventists. They are aged from under nine to over 90 years old.

== See also ==
- List of Seventh-day Adventist periodicals
- Pacific Press Publishing Association
- Seventh-day Adventist Church
