= Heritage Singers =

American gospel group founded by Max and Lucy Mace

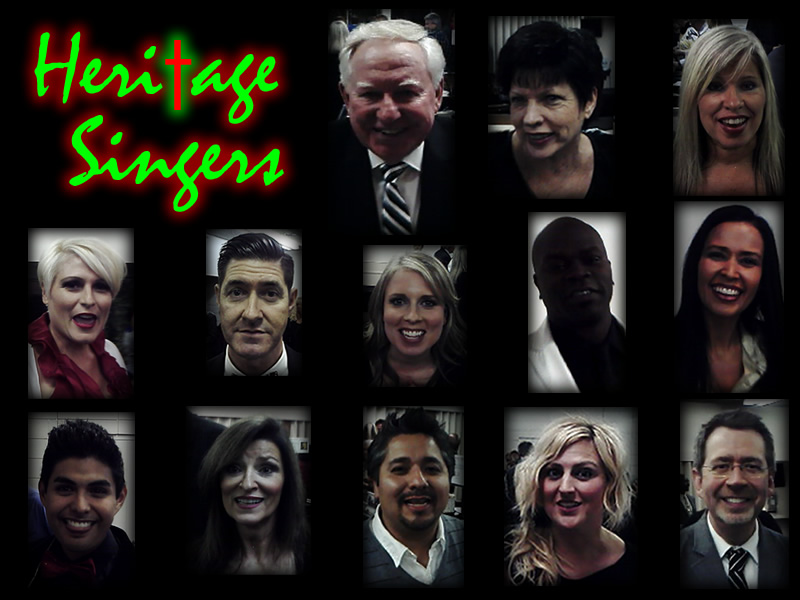

Background information
- Origin: Placerville, California, United States
- Genres: Gospel music, worship music, contemporary Christian
- Years active: 1971–present
- Labels: Chapel; Heritage
- Website: heritagesingers.com

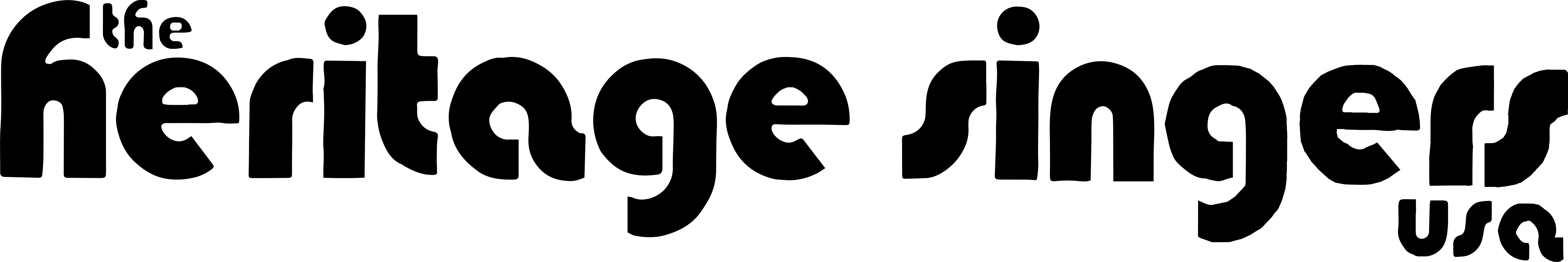
Early Logo of Heritage Singers, 1971

The Heritage Singers are an American gospel group founded by the late Max Mace and his wife Lucy, with their two children Valerie and Gregory. Based near Placerville, California, the group has traveled to over 65 countries, performed over 7,000 concerts, produced 200 episodes for television programs, and recorded over 200 albums.

== History ==
After four years of performing with the Rose City Singers, a patriotic/folk singing group sponsored by Portland-based United Medical Laboratories, the Maces decided to resign from their hospital duties and form a Christian group in 1971. Founding member Jerry Leiske named the group Heritage Singers, based on Bible scripture equating saints with God's "heritage ... objects of His special care."

Jerry and Rita Leiske left a short time thereafter and returned to their home in Alberta, Canada, to form their own singing group.

The first year, the Heritage Singers released two albums (Hymns We Remember and Come Along with the Heritage Singers), and performed their first public concert in Yakima, Washington on June 4, 1971. Original accompanists included Bob Silverman on piano and Gerald Allen on bass guitar, and Pete McLeod on guitar; Jeff Wood would later replace Allen. Later on, the Heritage Singers collaborated with Ronn Huff, who arranged many of their early albums with full orchestration. One of Max's nephews, Terry Mace, ran the sound system for the group for one year in 1972 until Max's son Greg took over at the age of 13 in 1973; he has been the group's sound tech since.

Heritage Singers bought a touring bus (a former Greyhound PD-4501 Scenicruiser they named "Old Blue") from a lot in San Francisco, which remained in their service for 10 years.

As their popularity grew, they formed a second group in September 1973, dubbed Heritage II, (subsequently named New Creation) to perform mostly at cities located in the eastern half of the United States;, and a third group in 1995, dubbed Heritage Español, which toured South America singing Spanish versions of the group's signature songs. Almost 300 people have performed as members of The Heritage Singers; however, the Mace family has remained at its core. As for the religious affiliation of its members, Max Mace has stated that while a majority of them are Seventh-day Adventists, that's not in itself a requirement. "They have to be a born-again Christian and receptive to the Adventist message."

Throughout the 1980s, the group televised a program called "Keep on Singing" and was aired on Trinity Broadcasting Network. Many of the programs are currently available on YouTube under the name "Heritage Singers Classics". Around the same time this program was aired, Heritage Singers began performing for Loma Linda University Church and have done so ever since. Individual members have also been invited to sing at various services there.

Starting in 1985, the group collaborated with Art Mapa, a Philippine-born sound producer, arranger, guitarist, and composer. Mapa would later marry the Maces' daughter Val. Soon after, Turning Point Studio was built on the Maces' expansive property near Placerville, CA that serves as the home base for the Heritage Singers. Their albums have been recorded there since. Not long after, Tim Davis came along and has been arranging and coaching vocals since 1992, joining them on stage a few concerts at a time.

== Reunions ==
Celebratory reunion concerts have been held in 1979 (Swing Auditorium), 1986 (Anaheim Convention Center), 2001 (Ontario Convention Center), and 2005 (Crystal Cathedral). A final 45th anniversary reunion was held at the Citizens Business Bank Arena on July 30, 2016, with 126 singers on stage.

== Death of founder ==
Following a battle with cancer, Max Mace died at the Heritage Ranch in Placerville on November 4, 2020, one day short of his 83rd birthday. At his funeral, his daughter Val announced that the group planned to continue with her as the director.

== Discography ==
=== Studio albums ===
List of albums with release dates and with record catalog numbers
Title	Details
Hymns We Remember	Released: 1971; Chapel Records Catalog No. S5188
Come Along with the Heritage Singers	Released: 1971; Chapel Records Catalog No. S5189
The King Is Coming	Released: 1972; Chapel Records Catalog No. S5193
Happy Side of Life	Released: 1972; Chapel Records Catalog No. S5205
Thanks to Calvary	Released: 1972; Chapel Records Catalog No. S5209
Sing-A-Long	Released: 1972; Chapel Records Catalog No. S5212
Talking About the Love of God	Released: 1972; Chapel Records Catalog No. S5219
I Just Came to Talk with You Lord	Released: 1973; Chapel Records Catalog No. S5222
Faith to the People	Released: 1973; Chapel Records Catalog No. CPS732; Souvenir album for sponsors of Faith For Today; Includes nine songs from five previous LPs (Happy, Thanks, Sing, Talking, I); Includes one song from pianist Bob Silverman's solo LP, He's Everything to Me
Revelation Generation	Released: 1973; Chapel Records Catalog No. CPS738; Souvenir album (same content as "Faith to the People" but different cover art); Includes nine songs from five previous LPs (Happy, Thanks, Sing, Talking, I); Includes one song from pianist Bob Silverman's solo LP, He's Everything to Me
Step into the Sunshine	Released: 1973; Chapel Records Catalog No. S5228; Accompanied by The Sunshine Singers (kids)
We've Come this Far by Faith	Released: 1973; Chapel Records Catalog No. S5236
Let's Just Praise the Lord	Released: 1973; Chapel Records Catalog No. S5241
Jesus Is the Lighthouse	Released: 1974; Chapel Records Catalog No. S5254
God's Wonderful People	Released: 1975; Chapel Records Catalog No. S5270
Heritage 5-Year Souvenir Album	Released: 1975; Chapel Records Catalog No. S5272
Christmas with the Heritage Singers	Released: 1975; Chapel Records Catalog No. S5273 (also S1021)
What More Could He Do	Released: 1976; Chapel Records Catalog No. S5300
Thinking Back: 100 Year Old Gospel Favorites	Released: 1976; Chapel Records Catalog No. S5302
Something Special	Released: 1976; Heritage Records Catalog No. HS1027; With songs from albums by The Mace Brothers, Judy Morton-Meckstroth, Jim McDonald, Heritage Singers II
I Am Willing, Lord	Released: 1977; Chapel Records Catalog No. S5325; Companion songbook of choral arrangements published in 1983
Heaven Is for Kids (Vol. I)	Released: 1978; Heritage Records Catalog No. HS1035
Someone Is Praying for You	Released: 1979; Chapel Records Catalog No. S5372
Rise Again	Released: 1979; Chapel Records Catalog No. S5373
Heaven Is for Kids, Vol. II	Released: 1980; Chapel Records Catalog No. S7015
Best of 10 Years	Released: 1981; Chapel Records Catalog No. S5425
We're Just People	Released: 1981; Starglo Catalog No. S1044
A Touch of Country	Released: 1982; Heritage Singers Catalog No. CD2310
Just a Little More Time	Released: 1982; Chapel Records Catalog No. S5442
Spirit of Praise	Released: 1983; Chapel Records Catalog No. S2314; Companion songbook of choral arrangements published in 1984
From the Heart	Released: 1984; Chapel Records Catalog No. S2318
We Wish You a Merry Christmas	Released: 1985; Chapel Records Catalog No. S2324
15 Year Anniversary	Released: 1986; Heritage Records Catalog No. 240
Right Now	Released: 1986; Image VII Catalog No. VII7810
Gospel Train	Released: 1988; Heritage Records Catalog No. C7035; Accompanied by Heritage Kids
No Compromise	Released: 1988; Heritage Records Catalog No. CD2347
What Is This?	Released: 1989; Heritage Records Catalog No. CD1004
Commissioned	Released: 1990; Heritage Singers Catalog No. CD5541
Songs You Remember Vol. I	Released: 1991; Heritage Records Catalog No. CD1006
Songs You Remember Vol. II	Released: 1991; Heritage Records Catalog No. CD1007
Songs You Remember Vol. III	Released: 1991; Heritage Records Catalog No. CD1008
Songs You Remember Vol. IV	Released: 1991; Heritage Records Catalog No. CD1009
Father of All	Released: 1992
Peacespeaker	Released: 1994; Heritage Singers Catalog No. CD5662
A Cappella	Released: 1994
You Are My Song	Released: 1995; Heritage Singers Catalog No. CD5671
Silver Anniversary Collection Vol. 1	Released: 1996; Heritage Singers Catalog No. CD9601; Digitally remastered versions of Hymns We Remember and Come Along with the Heritage Singers
Silver Anniversary Collection Vol. 2	Released: 1996; Heritage Singers Catalog No. CD9602; Digitally remastered versions of The King Is Coming and I Just Came to Talk to You Lord
Silver Anniversary Collection Vol. 3	Released: 1996; Heritage Singers Catalog No. CD9603; Digitally remastered versions of Happy Side of Life and Thanks to Calvary
Silver Anniversary Collection Vol. 4	Released: 1996; Heritage Singers Catalog No. CD9604; Digitally remastered versions of Sing-A-Long and Talking About the Love of God
Silver Anniversary Collection Vol. 5	Released: 1996; Heritage Singers Catalog No. CD9605; Digitally remastered versions of We've Come This Far by Faith and Let's Just Praise the Lord
Silver Anniversary Collection Vol. 6	Released: 1996; Heritage Singers Catalog No. CD9606; Digitally remastered versions of Jesus Is the Lighthouse and God's Wonderful People
Silver Anniversary Collection Vol. 7	Released: 1996; Heritage Singers Catalog No. CD9607; Digitally remastered versions of What More Could He Do and Thinking Back
Silver Anniversary Collection Vol. 8	Released: 1996; Heritage Singers Catalog No. CD9608; Digitally remastered versions of Someone Is Praying for You and I Am Willing, Lord
Silver Anniversary Collection Vol. 9	Released: 1996; Heritage Singers Catalog No. CD9609; Digitally remastered versions of We're Just People and Just a Little More Time
Silver Anniversary Collection Vol. 10	Released: 1996; Heritage Singers Catalog No. CD9610; Digitally remastered versions of From the Heart and Right Now
Reflections of Christmas	Released: 1996; Heritage Singers Catalog No. CDC5721
He Is Our Peace	Released: 1997; Heritage Singers Catalog No. CD5727
Heritage Country	Released: 1998; Heritage Singers Catalog No. CD5772
You Are Holy	Released: 1999; Heritage Singers Catalog No. CD5810
He Still Speaks	Released: 2000; Heritage Singers Catalog No. CD5811
Someone Cares	Released: 2001; Heritage Singers Catalog No. CD2001
Because of Love	Released: 2002; Heritage Singers Catalog No. CD2002
Hymns of Gold	Released: 2002; Heritage Singers Catalog No. CDG2002
Saved by Grace	Released: 2004; Heritage Singers Catalog No. CD2004
Renew Me	Released: 2005; Heritage Singers Catalog No. CD2005
Timeless Heirlooms	Released: 2006; Heritage Singers Catalog No. CDC2006
A New Day	Released: 2006; Heritage Singers Catalog No. CD2006
A Quiet Place	Released: 2007; Heritage Singers Catalog No. CDI2007; Instrumental version of A New Day except for some background vocals
No Greater Love	Released: 2007; Heritage Singers Catalog No. CD2007
Timeless Heirlooms II	Released: 2008; Heritage Singers Catalog No. CDC2008
Forgiven	Released: 2008; Heritage Singers Catalog No. CD2008; Band name of Heritage Country
Be Free	Released: 2009; Heritage Singers Catalog No. CD2009
The People's Choice: 40th Anniversary Collection	Released: 2010; Triple CD; Heritage Singers Catalog No. CD2010
Restored	Released: 2012; Heritage Singers Catalog No. CD2012
Max & Lucy's Favorite Hymns Through the Years	Released: 2015; Heritage Singers Catalog No. CDML2015; Includes one song from Max Mace's solo LP, Country Memories
The People's Choice: Volume 2	Released: 2015; Triple CD; Heritage Singers Catalog No. CDPC2015
Faithful	Released: 2019; Heritage Singers Catalog No. CD2020
Home for Christmas	Released: 2020; Heritage Singers Catalog No. CD2021
A Heritage Singers Tribute to Max Mace	Released: 2022; Heritage Singers Catalog No. CD2022
Testify	Released: 2024; Heritage Singers Catalog No. CD2024

=== Live albums ===
List of albums with release dates and with record catalog numbers
Title	Details
More Than Singing	Released: 1972; Chapel Records Catalog No. S5197; Includes one song each from Come Along With the Heritage Singers and Hymns We Remember; Includes seven songs from I Just Came to Talk With You Lord
Reunion	Released: 1979; Heritage Records Catalog No. S1042; Double album; Includes songs from Rise Again and Someone Is Praying for You
God Bless America Again	Released: 1981; Heritage Records Catalog No. S1045; Recorded at inauguration party for Ronald Reagan on January 20, 1981; Limited edition of 5,000 signed, numbered copies in red vinyl with personalized certificate; Includes 32-page booklet by Religious "Presidential" Inaugural Celebration...with Love (RPICWL)
Heritage Reunion Live: Celebrating 45 Years!	Released: 2016; Heritage Records Catalog No. CDHR2016; Triple CD

=== Videos ===
List of videos with release dates
Title	Details
Sydney Live Concert	Released: 1986
From Tahiti with Love	Released: 1987
Commissioned	Released: 1990
Tournee Brazil	Released: 1995
30th Anniversary Live Concert	Released: 2001; Heritage Singers Catalog No. DVD2001
Because of Love: The Session	Released: 2003
Simply Heritage: A Musical Journey	Released: 2004
Through the Years Vol. 1	Released: 2005; Heritage Singers Catalog No. DVD2005
An Evening at the Crystal Cathedral	Released: 2006; Heritage Singers Catalog No. DVDCC2006
Through the Years Vol. 2	Released: 2008; Heritage Singers Catalog No. DVD2008
Heritage Live, In Concert From Prague	Released: 2010; Heritage Singers Catalog No. DVDCZ2010
Heritage Reunion Live: Celebrating 45 Years!	Released: 2016; Heritage Singers Catalog Nos. DVDHR2016 (DVD) and BLUHR2016 (Blu-ray)

== Recent members ==
Singers

Typically 7 to 10 singers perform at each concert, and the line-up varies depending on the location and availability. Currently serving members consist of:

- Denar Almonte (2010 - 2013, 2016 - 2019, since 2023 in the main group; member of Heritage Español since 1995)
- Dave Bell (since 1982)
- Rob Burkey (since 1989)
- Tim Calhoun (since 1999)
- Marcelo Constanzo (since 2001 in the main group; member of Heritage Español since 2000)
- Melody Davis (since early 1994)
- Tim Davis (1989, since 1992; non-touring member since 2016)
- Garth Gabriel (1978 - 1983, since 2014 in the main group; member of Heritage Singers II from 1973/4 to 1978)
- Cindy Haffner (1978 - 1986, 1994 - 1997, since 2001)
- Frank John Sallis (since 1978 in the main group; member of Heritage Singers II from 1973/4 to 1975)
- Andrea Judd (since late 1997; non-touring member) º
- Marc Judd (since late 1997; non-touring member) º
- Shani Judd-Diehl (since 1995) º
- Adriane Mace (since 1995; non-touring member since 2016)
- Val Mace-Mapa (founding member)
- Chloe Mallory-Mapa (since 2018)
- Scott Reed (since late 1994) º
- Becki Trueblood-Craig (since 1983)
- Miguel Verazas (since 2012)

º denotes members of Faith First, a contemporary Christian singing group commonly associated with the Heritage Singers and the Voice of Prophecy.

Band

The recording musicians vary on each CD, and the live band does not perform at all of the concerts. Currently, the live band consists of:

- Art Mapa – guitars (since 1985)
- Austin Mapa – drums/percussion (since 2013)
- Nino Ocampo – bass (since 2004)
- Joel Umali – keyboards (since 1989)

Technical

- Tim Davis – vocal arranger and producer
- Greg Mace – sound engineer (founding member; singer from 1971 to 1985)
- Lucy Mace - tour manager (founding member; singer from 1971 to 1981)
- Art Mapa – music arranger, producer, programmer
