= List of Seventh-day Adventist periodicals =

This is a list of periodicals published by the Seventh-day Adventist Church or by its church members. They include both official and unofficial publications relating to Seventh-day Adventism. Magazines which are only available on the internet are not included.

Most periodicals are listed by location of the publisher. A brief list of the most circulated periodicals is also included.

Title	Location	Publisher	Language	Frequency	Circulation	Archives
Adult Sabbath School Bible Study Guide	United States: Nampa, Idaho	Pacific Press	English	Quarterly		2003—
Adventist Review	United States: Hagerstown, Maryland	Review and Herald	English	Weekly	30,000 paid	1849–1850 (Present Truth and Advent Review), 1850–1988, 1997—; Anniversary Issues
Adventist World	United States: Hagerstown, Maryland	Review and Herald, Lane Press, Korean Publishing Company, Signs Publishing Company	English, Spanish, French	Monthly	1,200,000 unpaid	2006—
Adventisten heute	Germany: Lüneburg	Advent-Verlag Lüneburg	German	Monthly	20,000 unpaid	2004—2009 (AdventEcho), 2010—
Atlantic Union Gleaner	United States: South Lancaster, Massachusetts	Atlantic Union Conference of Seventh-day Adventists	English	Monthly	22,000	2007—
Canadian Adventist Messenger	Canada: Oshawa, Ontario	Seventh-day Adventist Church in Canada	English	Monthly		2007—
Catalyst	Thailand: Saraburi	Institute Press, Asia-Pacific International University	English	Yearly	-	2007–present
College and University Dialogue		Committee on Adventist Ministry to College and University Students (AMiCUS)	English, Spanish, Portuguese, French	Three times per year	30,000	1994—
el Centinela	United States: Nampa, Idaho	Pacific Press	Spanish	Monthly	100,000	2007—
Florida Focus	United States: Winter Park, Florida	Florida Conference of Seventh-day Adventists	English	Quarterly	23,000	1997—
Gleaner (periodical)	United States: Ridgefield, Washington	North Pacific Union Conference of Seventh-day Adventists	English	Monthly	40,000	1906—present
Guide	United States: Nampa, Idaho	Pacific Press Publishing Association	English	Weekly	30,000	Individual story archives
Insight	United States: Hagerstown, Maryland	Review and Herald	English	Weekly		Cover story archives
La Femme d'Esprit	United States: Hagerstown, Maryland	Review and Herald	French	Bi-monthly		
FLAME	United States: Alvarado, Texas	Texas Conference of Seventh-day Adventists	English/Spanish	Quarterly		Publication Archive
Lake Union Herald	United States: Berrien Springs, Michigan	Lake Union Conference of Seventh-day Adventists	English	Monthly		2003—
Liberty	United States: Hagerstown, Maryland	Review and Herald	English	Bi-monthly	200,000	1930, 1997—
LIFE.info	United Kingdom: Alma Park, Grantham, Lincolnshire	British Union Conference of Seventh-day Adventists	English	Bi-monthly		Vol. 1 Issue 1—
Listen	United States: Hagerstown, Maryland	Review and Herald	English	9 issues per year		Article archives
Message	United States: Hagerstown, Maryland	Review and Herald	English	Bi-monthly	75,000	Archives
Ministry	United States: Hagerstown, Maryland	Review and Herald	English, Spanish, Portuguese, Russian, Korean, Chinese, Japanese, Indonesian, French	Monthly	53,000 unpaid	1928—
Mujeres del Espíritu	United States: Hagerstown, Maryland	Review and Herald	Spanish	Bi-monthly		
My Best Friends Magazine	United States: Hagerstown, Maryland	Review and Herald	English	Bi-monthly		
Our Little Friend	United States: Nampa, Idaho	Pacific Press	English	Weekly		
Outlook	United States: Lincoln, Nebraska	Mid-America Conference Union of Seventh-day Adventist	English	Monthly		2005—
Pacific Union Recorder	United States: Westlake Village, California	Pacific Union Conference of Seventh-day Adventists	English	Monthly	80,000	1901–1975, 2003—
PowerPoints Study Guide	United States: Hagerstown, Maryland	Review and Herald	English	Quarterly		
Primary Treasure	United States: Nampa, Idaho	Pacific Press	English	Weekly		
Real-Time Faith Bible Study Guides	United States: Hagerstown, Maryland	Review and Herald	English	Quarterly		
Record	Australia: Wahroonga	South Pacific Division of Seventh-day Adventists	English	Weekly	26,000	(1898–1966, 2002—)
Renewed & Ready	United States: Nampa, Idaho	Pacific Press	English	Monthly		
Shabbat Shalom	United States: Hagerstown, Maryland	Review and Herald	English	Three times per year		
Sharing Scripture	United States: Nampa, Idaho	Pacific Press	English	Monthly		
Signs of the Times	United States: Nampa, Idaho	Pacific Press	English	Monthly		1874–1979, 2007—
Signs of the Times (Australian version)	Australia: Warburton, Victoria	Signs Publishing Company	English	Monthly	45,000	1903–1925, 1926–1933, 2002—
Southern Tidings	United States: Decatur, Georgia	Southern Union Conference of Seventh-day Adventists	English	Monthly	More than 80,000	2000–2003, 2006—
Southwestern Union Record	United States: Burleson, Texas	Southwestern Union Conference of Seventh-day Adventists	English	Monthly		2004—
Edge	Australia: Wahroonga	Australian Union Conference of Seventh-day Adventists	English	Bi-Monthly	26,000	1997—
The FLAME	United States: Alvarado, Texas	Texas Conference of Seventh-day Adventists	English	Quarterly		2006—
Vibrant Life	United States: Hagerstown, Maryland	Review and Herald	English	Bi-monthly		
Visitor	United States: Columbia, Maryland	Columbia Union Conference of Seventh-day Adventists	English	Monthly	44,500	1901–1966, 2004–2006, 2007–2008
Winner	United States: Hagerstown, Maryland	Review and Herald	English	9 issues per year		Article archives
Women of Spirit	United States: Hagerstown, Maryland	Review and Herald	English	Bi-monthly		Article archive
Zeichen der Zeit	Germany: Lüneburg	Advent-Verlag Lüneburg	German	Quarterly	90,000 unpaid	2004—
Adventist Journal	ONLINE: Westmoreland, Jamaica	Advent Flame Media Centr				

== Periodicals by circulation ==
The list of Adventist periodicals by circulation may give some indication of notability, but this criterion alone does not measure the impact of a magazine, and gift subscriptions and other freely distributed magazines might be expected to have an inflated circulation. As an example, one may assume that academic journals have more influence than their lower circulations suggest.

Items here are also listed by location below. Many older issues of these periodicals can be viewed online at the Adventist Archives

- Adventist World – 1,200,000 (unpaid circulation)
- Liberty – over 200,000
- Health & Home(Adventist magazine) (flagship publication of Philippine Publishing House) – 165,000
- El Centinela (Spanish version of Signs of the Times) – 100,000
- Pacific Union Recorder – 75,000 unpaid
- Ministry – 53,000 (including 37,000 gift subscriptions)
- Signs of the Times (Australian version) – 45,000
- Gleaner – 40,000 unpaid subscribers
- Adventist Review – 30,000 paid subscribers
- Guide – 30,000
- College and University Dialogue – 30,000
- Record, magazine issued freely to Australian church members – 26,000
- Korean Signs of the Times – 17,000 in 2004

== Scholarly journals ==
- The Journal of Adventist Education.
- Journal of the Adventist Theological Society - ? paid; nearly 2000 unpaid
- Spectrum, Adventist focus, independent.
- Andrews University Seminary Studies - 600
- Journal of Asia Adventist Seminary (?)
- Journal of Adventist Mission Studies (?)
- Asia Adventist Seminary Studies (?)
- Valley View University Journal of Theology (?)
- Journal of AIIAS African Theological Association (?)

== Sabbath School lessons ==
These publications are used during Sabbath School time at church. Many are published on various denominational presses worldwide.

- Sabbath School Lesson study guide, or colloquially "the quarterly" (Adult)
- Beginner (infants)
- Kindergarten (Kindergarten)
- Our Little Friend (Kindergarten)
- Primary (Primary age)
- Primary Treasure (Primary age)
- PowerPoints (Juniors and Earliteens)
- Guide, a weekly story magazine for Juniors and Earliteens (10-14 year olds).
- Real Time Faith (Earliteens)
- Insight (Youth)
- Cornerstone Connections or Collegiate Quarterly (Youth)

== Official local area newsmagazines ==
The official newsmagazines include:

- The Inter-American Division Messenger 1924–1966 in DjVu format,

United States:

- Gleaner (North Pacific Union) 1906–present (as of 2018)
- Pacific Union Recorder (Pacific Union Conference) 1901–1975 in DjVu format, 2003—
- Visitor (Columbia Union Conference) 1901–1966 in DjVu format, 2004–2006, 2007–2008

== Adventist publishing houses ==
=== North America ===
North America is administered as the North American Division of Seventh-day Adventists.

==== Review and Herald Publishing Association ====
The Review and Herald Publishing Association:

- Adventist Review, the official Seventh-day Adventist magazine, issued weekly and with nearly 30,000 paid subscribers.
- Adventist World, an international magazine with 1.2 million unpaid circulation.
- Ministry, for pastors, by the Ministerial Association of Seventh-day Adventists. Monthly circulation to Adventists about 16,000; and bimonthly sent to about 37,000 pastors of other denominations on a gift basis. ISSN 0026-5314
- Liberty, devoted to religious freedom
- Listen, drug education for teens
- Message, mission with an urban edge
- Shabbat Shalom, aimed at facilitating dialogue between Jews and Christians
- Vibrant Life, about the health message
- Winner, drug education for late primary school age
- Women of Spirit, for women

==== Pacific Press Publishing Association ====
The Pacific Press Publishing Association:

- El Centinela monthly magazine, Spanish language version of Signs
- Signs of the Times monthly magazine for North America (one year of archives)

=== South Pacific ===
Signs Publishing Company in Warburton, Victoria, Australia is the church publisher of the South Pacific Division of Seventh-day Adventists. The three major magazines it publishes are:

- Signs of the Times, an easy-reading magazine in a format similar to Reader's Digest, the flagship publication of Signs Publishing Company for distribution in the South Pacific. It has a circulation of 45,000
- Record is a weekly news magazine aimed at churchmembers, issued freely to churches. Circulation of 26,000
- Edge is targeted at young adults, and published bimonthly by Signs Publishing.

=== Asia ===
- Catalyst, published from Mission College in Thailand
- Kerala Adventist Chronicle is the official magazine of southwest India union of SDA

=== South America ===
South America is administered as the South American Division of Seventh-day Adventists.

==== Asociación Casa Editora Sudamericana ====
The Asociación Casa Editora Sudamericana (South American Publishing House):

- Revista Adventista, the Spanish-language version of the Adventist Review.
- Vida Feliz, a publication related to the health message.
- Mis amigos, a publication in magazine format for children.

==== Universidad Adventista de Chile ====
The Universidad Adventista de Chile, through its Faculty of Theology publishes:

- Advenimiento, a theological review published semesterly, as a mean to make known researches in the biblical-theological field, in the context of the seventh-day adventist faith.

== Independent ==
These may be significantly left or right of the Adventist mainstream, or may just be published by an independent organization.

=== Historic Adventism ===
- Our Firm Foundation, published by Hope International
- Pilgrim's Rest, by Vance Ferrell
- Adventists Affirm, published from Michigan. Archives from Spring 2000 (as of August 2008)

=== More moderate ===
- Perspective Digest, the popular-level publication of the Adventist Theological Society
- Adventist Australia

=== Progressive/liberal Adventism ===
- Adventist Today
- Spectrum, published by the Association of Adventist Forums. In 2002, paid subscriptions numbered 3000
- Adventist Heritage
- Present Truth Magazine (formerly of Robert Brinsmead)
- Good News Unlimited
- Adventist Professional
- Adventist Currents
- Evangelica

== See also ==
- Seventh-day Adventist Church
- List of United States magazines
- Media ministries of the Seventh-day Adventist Church
- History of the Seventh-day Adventist Church
