= Chapel Music =

American religious music label of the Seventh-day Adventist Church

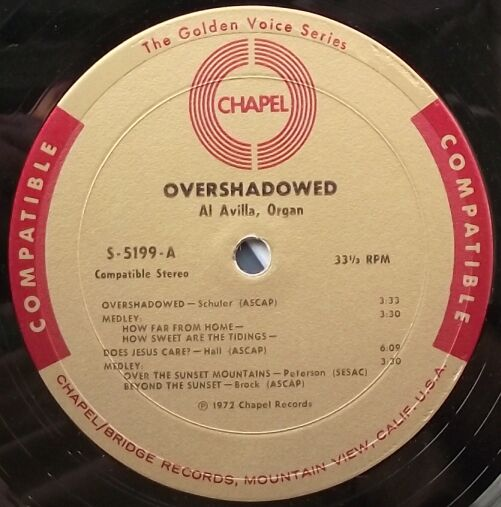
Chapel label, 1972

Chapel Music, formerly Chapel Records is a record label, currently in Nampa, Idaho (relocated from California) that releases religious music. The label was founded in the late 1940s and still releases several CDs each year. It is the long-standing official recorded music publisher of the Seventh-day Adventist Church. Among the artists who have recorded for Chapel are The King's Heralds, Del Delker, The Heritage Singers, Wintley Phipps, and Roy Drusky.

== History ==
Sabbath Music was a record label founded in 1948 as part of the World-Wide Bible Pictures department of the Pacific Union Conference of Seventh-Day Adventists. Initially the label was located in Glendale, California. The label's name changed quickly in order to market recordings to non-Adventists. By 1949 the product had caught the attention of Billboard reviewers, for music by Ben Glanzer and The King's Heralds. Records were released both on the Chapel Records and Cathedral Records imprints. The name "Chapel" seems to have been used for general distribution, and the name "Cathedral" for records marketed and distributed within Adventism. The Cathedral label was dropped after it was discovered that there was another Cathedral Records in existence in Michigan. The slogan of this religious label was "Music in the Home, Melody in the Heart". In 1955 ownership was transferred to Pacific Press Publishing Association and the label listed an address at Mountain View, California. By 1957 Chapel had added pre-recorded tapes to its line. By 1970, Chapel/Bridge was offering recordings in various formats including compact cassette tapes and 8-track cartridges in addition to vinyl and open reel tapes. In 1973, the label's sales exceeded over one-million U.S. dollars a year, and included distribution in such diverse places as Ghana, Finland, and Australia. The label's address moved to Nampa, Idaho when Pacific Press relocated there. In 2010, Chapel Music launched a website dedicated to digital downloads. By this time, more than 400 artists and groups had released material on Chapel.

== Bridge Records ==
The subsidiary label Bridge Records (Note: Not to be confused with the American classical music record label Bridge Records.) was started in 1970, formed to differentiate music specifically designed for "Sabbath listening", which would continue to be released on the Chapel imprint, and other types of music appropriate for Christian listening, but not necessarily to the taste of all Adventists.

== Output ==
Chapel issued numerous recordings by artists that had become popular through the Adventist mass-communication ministries. Among the best selling records issued by Chapel were albums issued by the Heritage Singers. So popular was this group that the imprint issued special pink labels for them. Additionally, the label issued recordings by artists who had sent audition tapes, often providing promising artists with production support. The label has produced albums of standard hymns, Southern gospel, Inspirational music, country, instrumental, classical, and folk, among other religious genres.

Chapel produced a series of 10-inch 78 rpm children's recordings by the likes of Elman Folkenberg, The Temple Trio, The King's Heralds, and most significantly Eric B. Hare and Arthur S. Maxwell. These recordings were also issued as 7-inch 33 rpm phonograph records, and many of them were transferred to digital format.
