= Signs of the Times (magazine) =

Seventh-day Adventist publishing house

- Editor: Marvin Moore, Lee Dunstan, Gerald du Preez
- Categories: Christian - Seventh-day Adventist
- Frequency: monthly
- Publisher: Pacific Press; Signs Publishing Company, Australia; Southern Africa Union Conference
- First issue: June 4, 1874
- Country: United States, Australia, South Africa
- Based in: Nampa, Idaho
- Language: English
- Website: www.signstimes.com
- ISSN: 0037-5047

Signs of the Times is a monthly magazine originally published by Pacific Press, a Seventh-day Adventist publishing house. The magazine focuses on lifestyle issues, health articles and Christian devotional and other religious subjects.

== Editions ==
Signs of the Times library reference number is OCLC 10930013. The editor of the American edition is Marvin Moore.

Signs is also available as an Australian version also known as Signs of the Times published by Signs Publishing Company. The Australian editor is Lee Dunstan.

In South Africa the Southern Publishing Association published a South African edition until 1990. From 1990 - 2012, Dr Eric Webster served as manager/editor of Signs, publishing the magazine on behalf of the Southern African Union Conference of Seventh-day Adventists (SAU). Dr Gerald du Preez now serves as editor, directly under the Communication Department of the SAU. Signs is published on a bi-monthly basis there.

The three editions collaborate on articles, layout and editorial policy.

== History ==
Signs of the Times was first published on June 4, 1874 by James White as a weekly newspaper, making it one of the longest running, continuously published, religious subscription magazines. (A Millerite magazine of the same name had been published earlier). Signs was significant in the founding of Pacific Press. The magazine conveyed Adventist viewpoints to those outside the Adventist faith, becoming the first significant publication to do so. The magazine changed from a weekly to a monthly publication in 1956. Circulation reached 275,000 in 1964. With a circulation of around 300,000, Signs of the Times was available in over 100 countries in 1974.

Until April 1984 another magazine, These Times, was published for distribution east of the Mississippi River, while Signs was distributed west of the Mississippi River. The current magazine is a merger of the two as of that date.

In 2007, Signs changed format to a smaller size and more pages with the change reaching South Africa in 2013.

== See also ==
- Signs of the Times (Australian magazine)
- List of Seventh-day Adventist periodicals
- Pacific Press Publishing Association
- Seventh-day Adventist Church
- Signs of the Times Publishing Association (Taiwan)
