= Seventh-day Adventist Hymnal =

Official hymnal of the Seventh-day Adventist Church

- Seventh-day Adventist Hymnal
- Language: English
- Subject: Hymnal of Christian worship songs and readings
- Publisher: Review and Herald Publishing Association
- Publication date: 1985
- Publication place: United States
- Pages: 830
- ISBN: 0-8280-0307-6
- OCLC: 17231985
- LC Class: M2131.S3 S38 1985
- Preceded by: Church Hymnal

The Seventh-day Adventist Hymnal is the official hymnal of the Seventh-day Adventist Church and is widely used by English-speaking Adventist congregations. It consists of words and music to 695 hymns including traditional favorites from the earlier Church Hymnal that it replaced, American folk hymns, modern gospel songs, compositions by Adventists, contemporary hymns, and 224 congregational responsive Scripture readings.

Published in 1985 by Review and Herald Publishing Association, the hymnal has been through multiple printings and is available in various binding colors.

== History ==
Although Adventist hymnals seem to have a lifetime of about it 25 years, by the early 1980s the existing hymnal had been in service since 1941. The General Conference Music Committee created a diverse 19-member Church Hymnal Committee chaired by C.L. Brooks with Wayne Hooper as secretary. As part of the process more than 3000 Adventist ministers were asked to rate the hymns of the then existing Church Hymnal. Those that were commonly used were retained. Songs that were added to the new hymnal include those of a more diverse and contemporary nature.

=== Earlier Adventist hymnals ===
The hymnal was preceded by the following:

- 1869 Hymns and Tunes for Those Who Keep the Commandments of God and the Faith of Jesus
- 1886 The Seventh-day Adventist Hymn and Tune Book (Hymns and Tunes)
- 1908 Christ in Song
- 1941 The Church Hymnal

== Adventist songs ==
There are 695 songs and 225 scripture readings (SR).

=== Worship ===
- Adoration and Praise: 1-38 (SR 696-708)
- Morning worship: 39-45
- Evening Worship: 46-58
- Opening of Worship: 59-63
- Close of Worship: 64-69

=== Trinity ===
- Trinity: 70-73 (SR 709)

=== God the Father ===
- Love of God: 74-81 (SR 710-713)
- Majesty and Power of God: 82-91 (SR 714-716)
- Power of God in Nature: 92-98 (SR 717-719)
- Faithfulness of God: 99-104 (SR 720-725)
- Grace and Mercy of God: 105-114 (SR 726-728)
- lord, enthroned in heavenly splendor
- sent forth by god's blessing
- cover with his lif 88e
- sweet by and by

=== Jesus Christ ===
- First Advent: 115-117 (SR 729)
- Birth: 118-143 (SR 730-731)
- Life and Ministry: 144-153 (SR 732)
- Sufferings and Death: 154-164 (SR 733-734)
- Resurrection and Ascension: 165-176 (SR 735-737)
- Priesthood: 177-180 (SR 738-739)
- Love of Christ for Us: 181-199 (SR 740-745)
- Second Advent: 200-221 (SR 746-747)
- Kingdom and Reign: 222-227 (SR 748-751)
- Sweet hour of prayer

=== Glory and Praise ===
- Glory and Praise

228-256

=== Holy Spirit ===
- Holy Spirit: 257-270 (SR 752)

=== Holy Scriptures ===
- Holy Scripture: 271-278 (SR 753-754)

=== Gospel ===
- Invitation: 279-290 (SR 755)
- Repentance: 291-296 (SR 756-757)
- Forgiveness: 297-300 (SR 758)
- Consecration: 301-331
- Baptism: 332-333 (SR 759)
- Salvation and Redemption: 334-343 (SR 760-766)

=== Christian Church ===
- Community in Christ: 344-354 (SR 767)
- Mission of the Church: 355-375 (SR 768)
- Church Dedication: 376
- Ordination: 377-378
- Child Dedication: 379

=== Doctrines ===
- Sabbath: 380-395 (SR 769-770)
- Communion: 396-411 (SR 771-773)
- Law and Grace: 412 (SR 774-775)
- Spiritual Gifts: 413-414 (SR 776-777)
- Judgement: 415-417 (SR 778-780)
- Resurrection of the Saints: 418-419 (SR 781)
- Eternal Life: 420-437 (SR 782-783)

=== Early Advent ===
- Early Advent: 438-454

=== Christian life ===
- Our Love for God: 455-460 (SR 791)
- Joy and Peace: 461-471 (SR 792-795)
- Hope and Comfort: 472-477 (SR 796)
- Meditation and Prayer: 478-505 (SR 797-798)
- Faith and Trust: 506-535 (SR 799-800)
- Guidance: 536-555 (SR 801-802)
- Thankfulness: 556-566 (SR 803)
- Humility: 567-570 (SR 804-805)
- Loving Service: 571-584 (SR 806-810)
- Love for One Another: 585-589 (SR 811-812)
- Obedience: 590-591 (SR 813-814)
- Watchfulness: 592-605 (SR 815-816)
- Christian Warfare: 606-619 (SR 817)
- Pilgrimage: 620-633 (SR 818-819)
- Stewardship: 634-641 (SR 820-821)
- Health and Wholeness: 642-644 (SR 822-824)
- Love of Country: 645-649 (SR 825)

=== Christian home ===
- Love in the Home: 650-655 (SR 826-829)
- Marriage: 656-659 (SR 830)

=== Sentences and responses ===
- Sentences and Responses: 660-695ppp

=== Worship aids ===
- Scripture Readings: 696-830
- Canticles and Prayers: 831-844
- Calls to Worship: 845-880
- Words of Assurance: 881-893
- Offertory Sentences: 894-907
- Benedictions: 908-920

== Companion book ==
Companion to the Seventh-day Adventist Hymnal (ISBN 0-8280-0425-0) was authored by Wayne Hooper (musical co-editor of the hymnal) and Edward E. White. It contains the history of each hymn in the hymnal and biographical information on the composers and authors.

== See also ==
- Annie R. Smith
- List of English-language hymnals by denomination
