= Signs of the Times (Australian magazine) =

Australian edition published by Signs Publishing Company

- Editor: Jarrod Stackelroth
- Associate Editor: Jesse Herford
- Assistant Editor: Zanita Fletcher
- Categories: Christian - Seventh-day Adventist
- Frequency: Monthly
- Publisher: Signs Publishing Company
- Total circulation: 10,000 per month
- First issue: 2 November 1886
- Country: Australia
- Language: English
- Website: signsmag.com
- ISSN: 1038-9733

Signs of the Times is a monthly subscription magazine published by Signs Publishing Company, a Seventh-day Adventist publishing house, for Australia and New Zealand. Signs is an easy-to-read magazine for the general public focused on understanding current issues from a biblical point of view as well as promoting a holistic and healthy Adventist lifestyle.

Signs is related to the North American magazine of the same title, which is published by Pacific Press.

== History ==
Signs of the Times began publication in Melbourne on 2 November 1885 under the name Bible Echo and Signs of the Times. It is believed to be one of Australia's longest-running periodicals, with only the Salvation Army's The War Cry edging it out by a few years.

== Awards ==
Signs has won the following awards from the Australasian Religious Press Association (website)

- 2010 – Best Layout - Highly Commended
- 2010 – Best Review of Another Medium - bronze: "Making Much of Little" by Nick Mattiske, April 2009
- 2010 – Best Article, Applying Faith to Life - silver: "From the Ashes" by Adele Nash, April 2009
- 2009 – "Best layout" category: Signs magazine "Highly commended" for being "constantly well laid out with good use of typography and format"
- 2009 – Best humorous item – silver: "Another Shot at Saying 'Sorry'" by David Edgren, May 2008
- 2005 – Best illustration – winner: "When Liberty Drops Her Torch" by Shane Winfield, July 2004
- 2003 – Best Features – winner: "Attack on the world trade center one year on" by Hans Kunnen, August 2003
- 2003 – Best Magazine Layout – highly commended: Signs of the Times magazine
- 2003 – Most Originality – winner: "Letter From the Future", Robert Wolfgramm, June 2001

== See also ==
- Signs of the Times (magazine)
- List of Seventh-day Adventist periodicals
- Signs Publishing Company
