= Fresno Adventist Academy =

Private school in California, United States

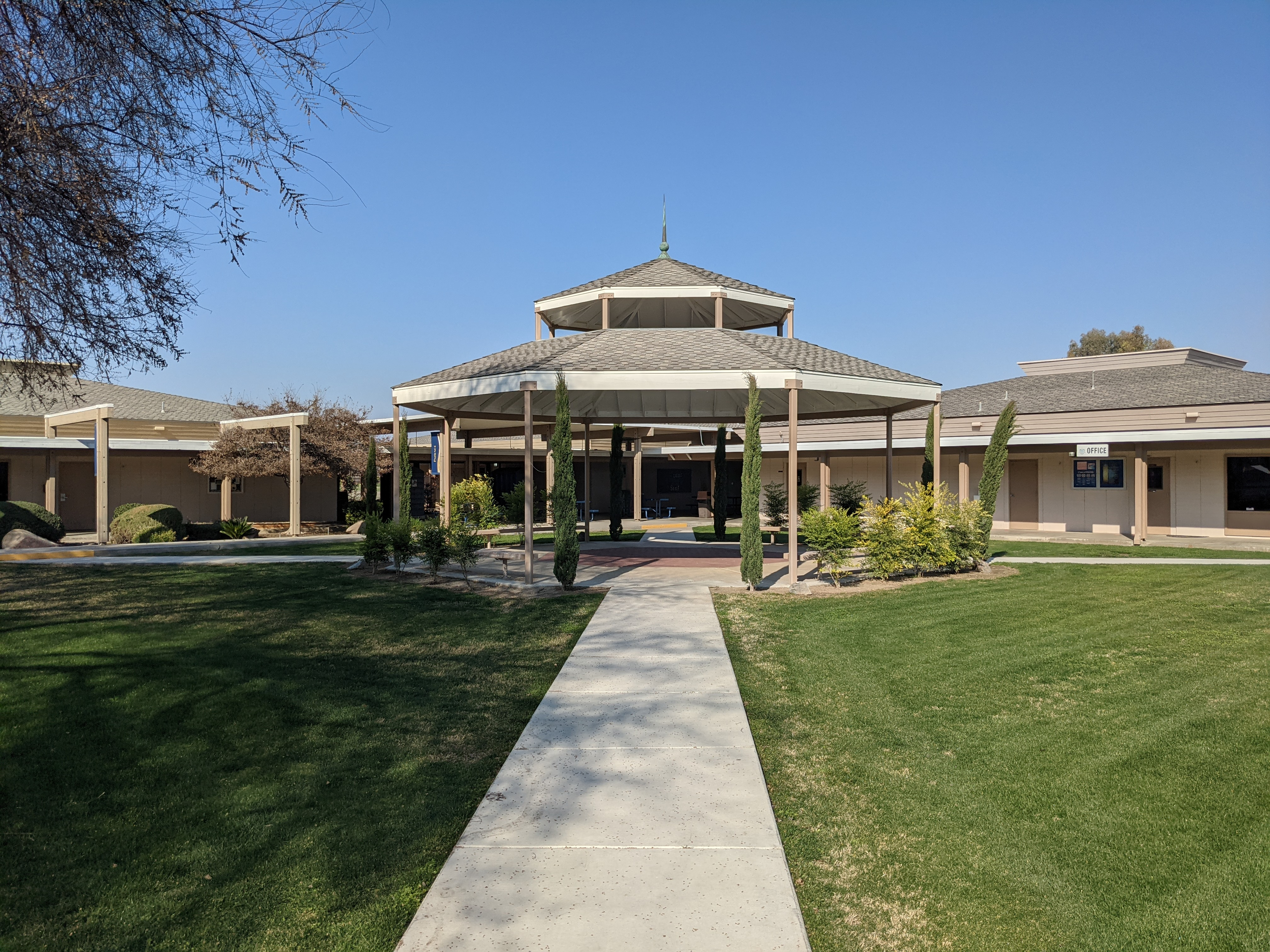
- The gazebo and front office of the academy

Location
- 5397 East Olive Avenue, Fresno California; 93727; United States
- Coordinates: 36.759167°N 119.712222°W

Information
- Type: Private parochial, Day high school
- Denomination: Seventh-Day Adventist
- Established: 1936 (90 years ago)
- Status: Active
- Principal: Iva Armstrong
- Staff: 19 full-time and 14 part-time
- Grades: K-12
- Gender: Coed
- Age: 5 to 18
- Classes offered: Business, general arts, science, mathematics, English, physical education,
- Classrooms: 16
- Campus size: 40 acres (16 ha)
- Colours: Blue and gold
- Fight song: Achieve-Become-Succeed
- Sports: Football, volleyball, basketball, track and field
- Mascot: Viking
- Nickname: FAA
- Rival: Armona
- Accreditation: Board of Regents of the General Conference of Seventh-day Adventist, Western Association of Schools and Colleges
- School fees: Yes
- Tuition: Yes
- Website: www.faa.org

Fresno Adventist Academy (FAA) is a K-12 school in Fresno, California owned and operated by the Seventh-day Adventist Church. Established in 1897, FAA is the only Seventh-day Adventist high school in the surrounding area. It is a part of the Seventh-day Adventist education system, the world's second largest Christian school system, overseen by the General Conference of Seventh-day Adventists located in Silver Spring, Maryland.

== History ==
=== Original campuses ===
Fresno Adventist Academy began as a church school at the Fresno Central Church in 1897 on Mariposa and O streets, in what later became downtown Fresno. The first non-graded classroom was filled with a dozen students and conducted by Lottie Walker. In 1917, George Driver (a member of the Fresno Central Church) donated five acres of land at 841 West Belmont. A school was built for the elementary and secondary grades at Fruit and Napa avenues, near Roeding Park. It was a ten-grade school until 1921, when grades 11 and 12 were added. By 1955, the enrollment had increased to 110 students in the elementary school program and 91 students in the academy.

=== Current campus on Olive Avenue ===
Elder L. R. Rasmussen and Elder W. O. Baldwin advised that the school be expanded and rebuilt. 40 acres were bought at 5397 East Olive Avenue. In 1967, phase 1 of the building program was completed; the K-6th grades were ready to be housed.

In 1969 school moved to a new location on East Olive Avenue. In December 1971, the 7th and 8th grades were able to transfer to the new campus. Phase 2 of the building program was to be completed after 1972.

In the 90s, a new multipurpose building was constructed thanks to donations from Alumni Del Webb's foundation and Businessman Pat Richiuti.

The campus includes a 13-acre (5.3 ha) organic farm run by a small local team with the student's help, called Harvest Fields Organic Farm. The farm sells fruits and vegetables through a community-supported agriculture box program.

== Religious life ==
All students take religion classes each year that they are enrolled. These classes cover topics in biblical history and Christian and denominational doctrines. Instructors in other disciplines also begin each class period with prayer or a short devotional thought, many of which encourage student input. Weekly, the entire student body gathers together in the chapel room for an hour-long chapel service. Outside the classrooms there is year-round spiritually-oriented programming that relies on student involvement. This includes student-initiated mission trips, most recently to the Philippines in 2019.

== Notable alumni ==
- Del Webb — construction, co-owner of the New York Yankees
- Darry Manning — class of 1994, nonprofit activist and bearer of the Olympic torch
- Morris Venden — Seventh-day Adventist preacher, teacher, and author
