= H. M. S. Richards =

Seventh-day Adventist evangelist and author

Harold Marshall Sylvester Richards Sr.
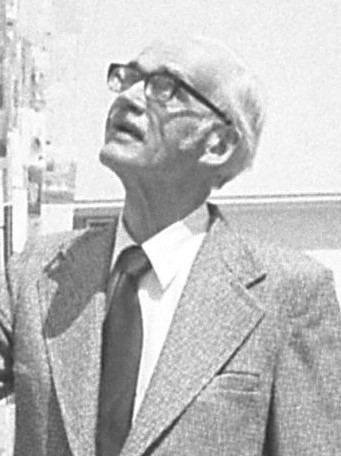
- Richards in 1973
- Born: August 28, 1894; Davis City, Iowa
- Died: April 24, 1985 (aged 90)
- Other name: H.M.S. Richards
- Education: Washington Missionary College (now Washington Adventist University)
- Spouse(s): Mabel Annabel Eastman Richards (August 15, 1899 - October 25, 2002)
- Children: Virginia Cason; H.M.S. Richards Jr. Kenneth E. H. Richards; Jan Richards
- Parent: Halbert M. J. Richards
- Church: Seventh-day Adventist
- Offices held: Founder/Speaker/Director Voice of Prophecy

Harold Marshall Sylvester Richards Sr. (August 28, 1894 – April 24, 1985), commonly known as H. M. S. Richards, was a well-known Seventh-day Adventist, Pioneer in radio evangelism, Teacher, and author.

Born in Iowa, he is most famous for founding the Voice of Prophecy radio ministry and was a pioneer in religious radio broadcasting. His ministry inspired broadcasts in 36 languages on more than 1,100 stations, and Bible courses in 80 languages offered by 144 correspondence schools.

== Early life ==
Richards began his ministry as a tent preacher when he was 17. His brother worked as a driver for then Senator Warren G. Harding. Harding invited him to see a demonstration of the newly invented radio. Richards came to view radio as a way to bring the Gospel to nations. He came to California during the Great Depression and made radio broadcasts starting in 1929, when he gave a 15-minute guest sermon on KNX in Los Angeles. He noted that every six days 1,000,000 more people come into the world. He viewed the radio as a way of keeping up with these new additions to the human race.

Richards married Mabel Annabel Eastman in 1920, and they had 1 daughter and 3 sons. He died in 1985 at the age of 90. In 1940, Richards ran on a very limited budget. By contrast, in 1980, he had a $6 million budget and a staff of researchers to help him avoid early foibles.

== Radio broadcasting ==
Upon graduation from Washington Missionary College (now Washington Adventist University) in 1919, H.M.S. Richards served as an evangelist in various places in the United States and Canada and during this period experimented with radio announcements in connection with his meetings. He began regular radio broadcasts on October 19, 1929 on KNX (AM) in Los Angeles.

Later Richards presented daily live broadcasts of The Tabernacle of the Air over KGER in Long Beach, and live weekly remote broadcasts from his tabernacle to KMPC (AM) in Beverly Hills.

In his presentations he taught history. "Bible prophecy is not given so we can see what will happen, but so we can see what already happened, and get confirmation that the Bible is true. If it came true historically, then when Jesus gives his wonderful teachings, we ought to believe that, too," he noted.

In January 1937 his radio footprint expanded over a network of several stations of the Don Lee Broadcasting System, and the name of the broadcast was changed to the Voice of Prophecy.

His first coast-to-coast broadcast over 89 stations of the Mutual Broadcasting System was on Sunday, January 4, 1942.

Throughout the years Richards' Voice of Prophecy broadcasts were marked by an opening theme song of "Lift Up the Trumpet" performed by the King's Heralds quartet and closed with his poem "Have Faith in God" each week having a new verse written.

== As an author ==
In addition to published sermons and booklets, Richards authored the following books:

- The Indispensable Man
- The Promises of God
- What Jesus Said
- Feed My Sheep
- Look to the Stars
- Why I Am a Seventh-day Adventist
- One World
- Revival Sermons
- Day After Tomorrow

== Awards and biographies ==
- Awarded the Honor Citation by the National Religious Broadcasters in 1967 and 1970.
- Honorary doctorate conferred by Andrews University in 1960.
- Washington Adventist University's faculty of religion building "HMS Richards Hall" on Flower Ave, Takoma Park, MD is named in his honor
- La Sierra University renamed its School of Religion the "H.M.S. Richards Divinity School" and has also designated an "H.M.S. Richards Library" to honor him for his work in the Seventh-day Adventist Church.
- H.M.S. Richards Adventist Academy, located in Loveland, Colorado, was renamed in his honor in 1960. He was a graduate of the nearby Campion Academy.

His life has been the subject of two biographies:

- H.M.S. Richards Man Alive by his daughter Virginia Cason
- H.M.S. Richards: A Biography by Robert E. Edwards, longtime member of the King's Heralds

== See also ==
- Seventh-day Adventist Church
- Seventh-day Adventist theology
- Seventh-day Adventist eschatology
- History of the Seventh-day Adventist Church
- 28 Fundamental Beliefs
- Questions on Doctrine
- Teachings of Ellen G. White
- Inspiration of Ellen G. White
- Prophecy in the Seventh-day Adventist Church
- Investigative judgment
- Pillars of Adventism
- Second Coming
- Conditional Immortality
- Historicism
- Three Angels' Messages
- Sabbath in seventh-day churches
- Ellen G. White
- Adventism
- Seventh-day Adventist Church Pioneers
- Seventh-day Adventist worship
