= Insight (Adventist magazine) =

American magazine

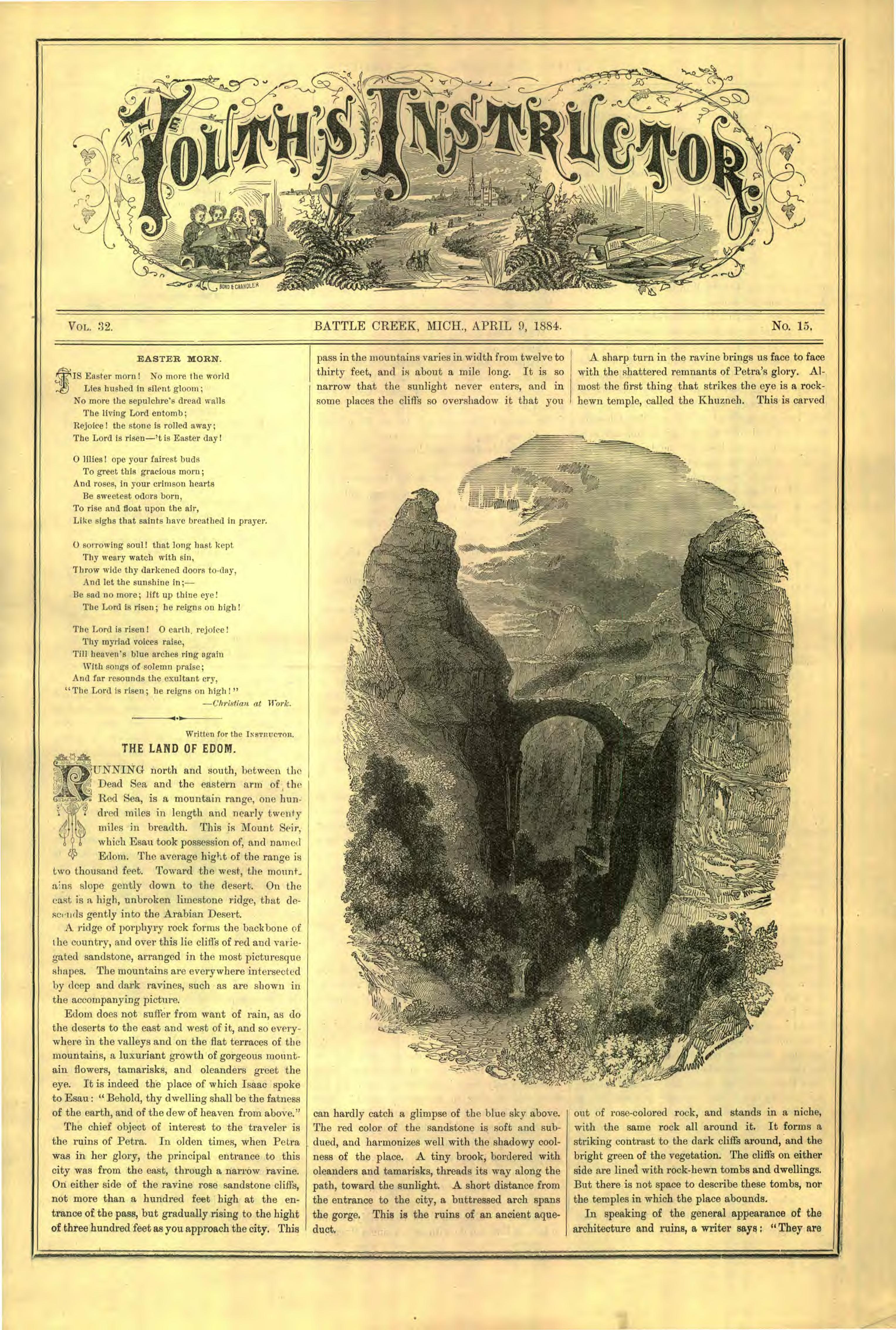
- Cover of The Youth's Instructor, the predecessor to Insight, from April 9, 1884
- Editor: Omar Miranda (last)
- Categories: Christian - Seventh-day Adventist
- Frequency: Weekly
- Publisher: Review and Herald
- Founded: 1970
- First issue: May 4th, 1970
- Final issue: July 1st, 2017
- Country: United States
- Based in: Hagerstown, Maryland
- Language: English
- ISSN: 0020-1944

Insight, successor to The Youth's Instructor, was a weekly magazine designed for Seventh-day Adventist young people, published from 1970–2017 by Review and Herald. It was described as one of the "most important" Adventist magazines.

== History and profile ==
The predecessor magazine, known as The Youth's Instructor, was established in 1852 by James White, husband of Ellen G. White. It was distributed primarily through the Sabbath schools.

Under the editorship of Lora E. Clement in the early-mid 1900s, the circulation increased from about 25,000 to 50,000.

The Youth's Instructor was replaced by Insight in 1970. The headquarters of Insight was in Hagerstown, Maryland.

"In 2016 Lori Tripp Peckham returned as editor to curate one final year of Insight. The “farewell tour,” with no original material in each issue beyond a short editor’s message, reprinted story and feature highlights from throughout the magazine’s history. “Now it’s time for a change,” Peckham wrote to readers. “The North American Division Youth and Young Adult Ministries Department is launching something completely new. Keep watching right here to find out what’s coming next.”^{113} One year later Insight printed its last issue, dated July 1, 2017, though with no announcement of anything new to succeed it. While the NAD focused on developing resources for Sabbath school programming,^{114} the church created no new media to replace Insight."

=== Editors of The Youth's Instructor (selected) ===
- 1852: James White
- 1869–1871: Goodloe Harper Bell
- 1923–1952: Lora E. Clement (who lived from 1890 to 1958)
- 1952-1970: Walter Crandall

=== Editors of Insight ===
- 1970: F. Donald Yost (associate editors: Pat Horning, Chuck Scriven)
- 1971: Roland Hegsted, acting editor
- 1972: Mike Jones (Michael Jones)
- 1975: Donald John
- 1982: Dan Fahrbach
- 1986: Chris Blake
- 1993: Lori Peckham
- 2002: Dwain Esmond
- 2013: Omar Miranda
- 2016: Lori Tripp Peckham

=== Notable contributor to The Youth's Instructor ===
- Edmund C. Jaeger, renowned naturalist and author (121 articles from 1908 to 1922)

== See also ==
- List of Seventh-day Adventist periodicals
