= Gem State Adventist Academy =

Private school in Idaho, United States

Coordinates: 43°36′21″N 116°41′03″W

Location
- 16115 South Montana Ave; Caldwell, Idaho 83607; United States

Information
- Type: Christian (Seventh-day Adventist)
- Faculty: 10
- Grades: 9-12
- Enrollment: 76
- Colors: Royal blue and white
- Mascot: Jaguar
- Accreditation: Adventist Accrediting Association
- IHSAA Division: 1A
- Website: www.gemstate.org/

Gem State Adventist Academy or just Gem State Academy is a private, Seventh-day Adventist high school located in Caldwell, Idaho. Gem State Adventist Academy is a part of the Seventh-day Adventist education system, the world's second largest Christian school system.

== Accreditation ==
All teachers are certified through the State of Idaho and the North Pacific Union Conference of Seventh-Day Adventist. Gem State's curriculum complies with State of Idaho and the North Pacific Union Conference of Seventh-Day Adventist standards for curriculum. Gem State Adventist Academy is accredited the Northwest Accreditation Commission, the Accrediting Association of Seventh-Day Adventist Schools, Colleges and Universities, Inc. and the National Council for Private School Accreditation.

== Athletics ==
The academy offers the following varsity competitive sports

- Basketball (boys & girls)
- Volleyball (girls)
- Flag Football (boys)

In addition, the school sponsors a Basketball team called The GSAA Jaguars.

== See also ==
- List of Seventh-day Adventist secondary and elementary schools
- List of Seventh-day Adventist colleges and universities
- List of Seventh-day Adventist hospitals
- List of Seventh-day Adventist medical schools
- List of Seventh-day Adventist secondary schools
- Seventh-day Adventist education
- Seventh-day Adventist Church
- Seventh-day Adventist theology
- History of the Seventh-day Adventist Church
- Seventh-day Adventist Church
