= King's Heralds =

American gospel quartet

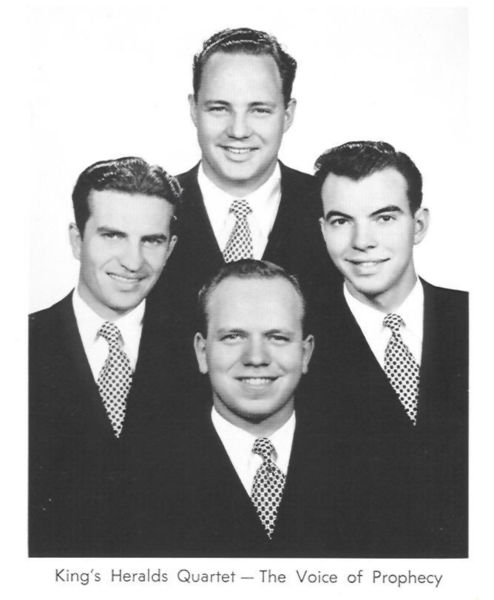
- The 1949-1961 King's Heralds Quartet, famously known as the Hooper Quartet, featuring Wayne Hooper (Baritone; Left), Bob Seamount (2nd Tenor; Top), Bob Edwards (1st Tenor; Bottom), and Jerry Dill (Bass; Right).

Background information
- Also known as: Lone Star Four; Hooper Quartet; The Heralds
- Origin: Keene, Texas
- Genre: Gospel
- Label: Chapel
- Members: Don Scroggs; Bruce Hehn; JR Rosa; Jeff Pearles
- Past members: See section
- Website: khqofficial.org

The King's Heralds, formerly the Lone Star Four, are a male gospel music quartet that began in 1927 and have recorded over 100 albums encompassing 30 languages. They are primarily known for their a cappella singing and close harmony.

== History ==
The King's Heralds began in 1927 by four college students from Southwestern Adventist University: brothers Louis, Waldo and Wesley Crane and Ray Turner (1908-2008) in Keene, Texas, who began singing gospel music, under the name Lone Star Four. They soon appeared with Pastor R. L. Benton on his radio program on KFPL from Waco, Texas.

In 1936, they were invited by H.M.S. Richards to join the Voice of Prophecy in California, and were renamed the King's Heralds after a radio naming contest. This association continued until 1982, when they became a self-supporting ministry.

The King's Heralds are also known by the name The Heralds, in Portuguese as the Arautos do Rei and in Spanish as Los Heraldos del Rey. Purported to be the oldest continuous gospel quartet in America, they have been singing for almost a century!

Throughout the years they have performed in over 50 countries and continue to tour extensively. They were the first gospel music group from the West to tour The People’s Republic of China since 1949, singing for the "First Invitational Symposium on the Christian Church in China" sponsored by the US/China Education Foundation.

Long associated with the Seventh-day Adventist Voice of Prophecy radio broadcast, the Heralds are now promoted as inter-denominational and are regular guests on Praise The Lord on TBN and It Is Written.

== Discography ==
Most of their recordings have been released by Chapel Records.

- "O Little Town of Bethlehem" (Chapel 100, 10", 1950) also on 78 rpm and 45 rpm set
- "Favorite Hymns and Songs" (Chapel 101, 10", 1950) also on 78 rpm set
- "Deep River" (Chapel 102, 10", 1950)
- "King's Heralds & Del Delker" (Chapel 103, 10", 1951-53?)
- "Garden of Prayer" (Chapel 1211, 10", 1953)
- "Old Hymns of Faith vol.1" (Chapel 1220, 10", 1953)
- "Old Hymns of Faith vol.2" (Chapel 1221, 10", 1953)
- "That One Lost Sheep" (Chapel 1233, 10", 1953-54?)
- "Song of Heaven & Homeland" (Chapel 1240, 10", 1954-55?)
- "Jesus Is Coming Again" with Del Delker (Chapel 1509, 10", 1955)
- "Radio Favorites" (Chapel 1510, 10", 1955)
- "Songs for Sabbath" (Chapel 1517, 10", 1956)
- "Silent Night" (Chapel 1518, 10", 1956)
- "Songs of Thanksgiving" (Chapel 1526, 1956-1961?)
- "The Golden Moment" (Chapel 5007, 1956-1961?)
- "A Boy Named David" (Chapel 7001, 1956-1961?)
- "Our Prayer" (Chapel 5012, 1957-1961?)
- "Birthday of a King" (Chapel 5016, 1957-1961?)
- "Out of the Deep" (Chapel 5023, 1957-1961?)
- "I Believe" (Chapel 5031, 1957-1961?)
- "Lost in the Night" (Chapel 5052, 1957-1961?)
- "Camp-Meeting Favorites" (Chapel 5057, 1962)
- "Garden of Prayer" (Chapel 5067, 1962)
- "That Great Gettin'-Up Morning" (Chapel 5070, 1963)
- "There's A Wideness In God's Mercy" (Chapel 5052, 1963-4)
- "Come Children Join To Sing" (Chapel 7005, 1965)
- "We'll All Praise God" with Faith For Today Quartet (Chapel 5092, 1966)
- "King's Heralds Favorites Through 25 Years" (Chapel 5105, 1966)
- "Wheel In A Wheel" (Chapel 5127, 1967)
- "Near To The Heart Of God" (Chapel 5144, 1968)
- "Precious Memories" (Chapel 5171, 1968-70)
- "We Worship Thee" (Chapel 5172, 1968-70)
- "Master Designer" (Chapel 5183, 1971)
- "Listen To The Sound" (Chapel 5202, 1972)
- "Amazing Grace" (Chapel 5216, 1973)
- "It's Spiritual" (Chapel 5238, 1974)
- "Side By Side" (Chapel 5242, 1974)
- "Yes, God Is Real" (Chape 5265, 1975)
- "A Cappella Again" (Chapel 5290, 1976)
- "Love" (Chapel 5299, 1976)
- "If My People" (Chapel 5312, 1977)
- "40th Anniversary Album" (Chapel 5320, 1977)
- "In Remembrance Of Me" (Chape 5323, 1978)
- "Healing Love" (Chapel 5355, 1979)
- "Songs For Kids" (Hosanna House 7016, 1980)
- "Rainbow Album" (Chapel 5400, 1980)
- "Homesick For Heaven" (1981)
- "Best Of Christmas" (Chapel 5419, 1981)
- "Don't Give Up!" (Chapel 5447, 1982)
- "Favorites Through The Years" (Chapel 5458, 1983)
- "Our Brand Of Country" (Acclaim S2316, 1984)
- "Favorite American Folksongs" (Acclaim, 1984)
- "Another Rainbow" (Chapel 5481, 1985)
- "Try A Little Kindness" (Acclaim, 1986)
- "Honor The Lord" (1987)
- "For All Us Kids" (1988)
- "The Way We Were" (1990)
- "Git'On Board" (1991)
- "Homeward Bound" (1992)
- "Morning Has Broken" (1993)
- "Behold The Lamb" (1994)
- "Be Still My Soul" (1995)
- "The Heralds Christmas" (1995)
- "I Need Thee Every Hour" (1996)
- "70th Anniversary Album" (1998)
- "Higher Ground" (2000)
- "King's Heralds Reunion Concert" (2000)
- "Fireside Reunion" (2000)
- "Celebrate" (2001)
- "Revival" (2002)
- "Delivered! Spirituals" (2002-3)
- "Jerry's Farewell" (2003)
- "Then & Now" (2005) Recorded at the General Conference Session in St. Louis, MO.
- "Encores" with Jim Ayars (2005), with Jeff Pearles (2006)
- "Anthology Volume 1" (2006)
- "Anthology Volume 2" (2007)
- "I Just Can't Wait!" (2007).
- "Hymn Sessions" (2009) - arranged by Russell Hospedales, released at the National Quartet Convention.
- "Then & Now" (2010)-recorded exclusively at the 2010 General Conference session in Atlanta, GA
- "Wake Up, Church!" (2011) - released at the National Quartet Convention.
- "Time's Windin' Up" (2012)
- "Thy Blessed Spirit" (2014)
- "Telling The World" (2016)
- "Give The World A Smile" (2017)

== Awards ==
- Recipient of twenty-three Silver Angel Awards for "Excellence in Media", including six for "Best Male Vocal Group", fourteen for "Best Album" and a "Best International Broadcast" award for their own radio program, "Sounds of Praise".
- "Gold" Angel Award for being the oldest continuous Gospel Quartet in America.

== List of singers ==
=== Current singers ===
The quartet is currently composed of:

- Don Scroggs - 1st Tenor
- Bruce Hehn - 2nd Tenor
- JR Rosa - Baritone
- Jeff Pearles - Bass

https://khqofficial.org/bio

=== Complete list of singers ===
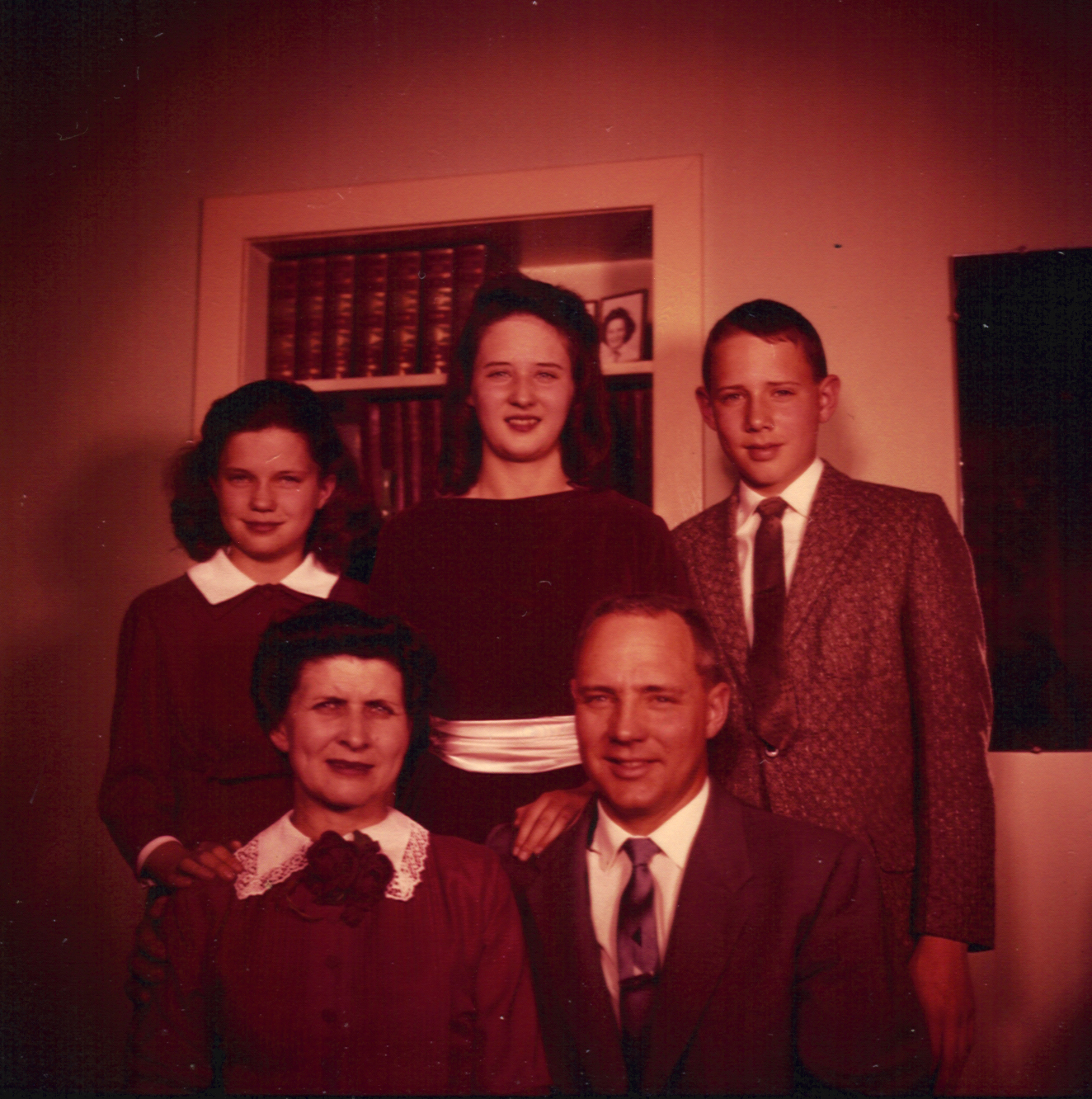
Bob Seamount, Second Tenor 1941-1947, 1949-1961, and his family (1958)

Past and present singers listed alphabetically by first name, including years in the group:

First Tenor:

- Louis Crane (1927-1939)(d.1995)
- Bob Johnson (1939-1941)(d.1999)
- George Casebeer (1941-1944)(d.1993)
- Ben Glanzer (1944-1947)(d.1997)
- Frank Dietrich (1947)(d.1995) (moved to 2nd tenor)
- Elwyn Ardourel (1949)(d.1997)
- Robert (Bob) E. Edwards (1949-1971)(d.2004)
- John Ramsey (1971-1983)
- Don Scroggs (1983-present)

Second Tenor:

- Waldo Crane (1927-1939)(d.1969)
- Vernon Stewart (1939-1940)(d.1982)
- Ralph Simpson (1940-1941)(d.1966)
- Bob Seamount (1941-1948), (1949-1961)(d.1976)
- Frank Dietrich (1948) (moved from 1st tenor)
- John Thurber (1961-1967)(d.2019)
- Jerry Patton (1967-2004)(d.2024)
- Gerald Fuentes (2004)
- Joel Borg (2004–2013)
- Jared Otto (2013–2017)
- Ben Jenkins (2017–2018)
- Mark Ringwelski (2018-2022)
- Joseph Smith (2022)
- JR Rosa (2022-2024) (moved to baritone)
- Bruce Hehn (2024-present)

Baritone:

- Wesley Crane (1927-1943)(d.1985)
- Wayne Hooper (1944-1947), (1949-1962)(d.2007)
- Richard Lange (1947-1948)(d.1992)
- Jerry Dill (1948-1949)(d.2005) (moved from bass)
- Jack Veazey (1962-1997)
- Steve Laing (1997-2002)
- Russell Hospedales (2002–2018)
- John Watkins (2018-2024)
- JR Rosa (2024-present) (moved from 2nd tenor)

Bass:

- Ray Turner (1927-1947)(d.2008)
- Jerry Dill (1947-1948), (1949-1962) (moved to baritone, and then moved back to bass)
- Joe Melashenko (1948-1949)(d.2013)
- Jim McClintock (1962-1977)(d.2021)
- Jim Ayars (1977-2005)
- Jeff Pearles (2005-present)

== Accompanists/Arrangers ==
- Irving Steinel, 1937-1942
- Al Avila, 1942-1950
- Beth Thurston, 1950-1953
- Brad Braley, 1953-1972
- Calvin Taylor, 1972-1977
- Jim Teel, 1977-1989
- John Grover Lewis, 1989-1995
- Russell Hospedales, 2002–2018
