= Signs Publishing Company =

Signs Publishing Company is a Seventh-day Adventist publishing house in Warburton, Victoria, Australia.

== History ==
Three Adventist preachers, Stephen Haskell, John Corliss and Mendel Israel, a printer, Henry Scott, and an experienced door-to-door literature salesperson, William Arnold, travelled from San Francisco to Sydney on 6 June 1885.

The Signs Publishing Company first began as the Echo Publishing Company, in Fitzroy North, a suburb of Melbourne. By 1889, the Echo Publishing Company employed 83 people and was the third largest Seventh-day Adventist publishing house in the world.

The management were committed to the printing and distribution of Seventh-day Adventist literature but were also commercially successful — so successful, in fact, that they soon became the unofficial government printers for Victoria. The church decided this was moving in the wrong direction, so decided on a move to Warburton in 1906, where the operation could return to its religious roots.

However the move deprived the company of the considerable income created by the outsourced work, thus funding for religious material was at a premium. Cheap hydro-electricity and abundant land for both factory premises and staff housing were the predominant reasons for the choice of location, and in fact the "Wonwondah" property that was bought had been owned by the husband of a local Adventist. The Signs Publishing Company was formed and remained on the original premises until 1934, when the Yarra River flooded the valley and ruined a large part of the machinery and building.

A new, brick factory was built on higher ground in 1935 for £23,000. Over the years the building has gone through a number of extensions, the last major extension in 1979 cost $625,000 — adding 21,000 square feet (2,000 m^{2}). The Signs building along with the Sanitarium building next door are now heritage listed. The Signs Publishing Company currently employs around 50 staff in a variety of print/publishing/import-export positions.

In July 2006, Signs was amalgamated with the Adventist Media Centre and South Pacific Division into a single body. From 2010, Signs and Record magazines will be published from the church's headquarters in Wahroonga, Sydney, yet still printed and distributed from Warburton.

While the modern plant is far removed from the early publishing operation, the philosophy of the company remains the same — to produce and distribute Christian literature for the South Pacific region.

== Publications ==
The company publishes three major magazines:

- Signs of the Times, an easy-reading magazine in a format similar to Reader's Digest. It is the flagship publication of Signs Publishing Company, and is for distribution in the South Pacific. It has a circulation of 45,000
- Record is a weekly news magazine aimed at churchmembers, issued freely to churches. Circulation of 26,000
- Edge is targeted at young adults, and published bimonthly. It was founded in 1997 with Brenton Stacey as editor. Kellie Hancock was the editor for nearly 4 years, and commented, "The Edge's archival value for youth ministry is unprecedented. Nothing else provides the coverage of events and supportive resources on a broad range of issues for Adventist youth and those who minister to them." In 2009, Adele Nash was the present and longest-serving editor. It was originally produced by Signs Publishing Company, but from 2010 is to be produced by the Australian Union Conference.

== See also ==
- List of Seventh-day Adventist periodicals
- Seventh-day Adventist Church
