= Voice of Prophecy =

Seventh-day Adventist religious radio ministry

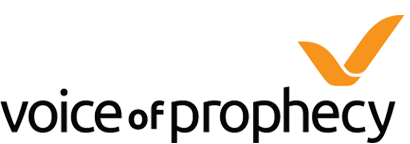
- Type: Religious/Non-Profit
- Founded: October 19, 1929
- Founder: H. M. S. Richards
- Headquarters: Loveland, Colorado, United States
- Area served: North America, Guam, Micronesia, Puerto Rico
- Key people: Shawn Boonstra (Speaker/Director) Jean Boonstra (Associate Speaker)
- Website: www.vop.com

The Voice of Prophecy, founded in 1929 by H. M. S. Richards, is a Seventh-day Adventist religious radio ministry headquartered in Loveland, Colorado.

Initially airing in 1929 on a single radio station in Los Angeles, the Voice of Prophecy has since grown to numerous stations throughout the United States and Canada. It was one of the first religious programs in the United States to broadcast nationally. Under the leadership of Shawn and Jean Boonstra, the ministry has now expanded into additional forms of media, including the weekly Authentic broadcast and Discovery Mountain radio adventure series for kids. Additional projects include humanitarian efforts in countries such as India and Myanmar.

== History ==
H.M.S. Richards, Sr. began a regular radio program on October 19, 1929, on KNX (AM) in Los Angeles.

Richards earliest studio was his South Gate Tabernacle near Long Beach, where he was presenting nightly evangelistic meetings. His office was a renovated chicken coop in Walnut Park, California. Seventh-day Adventist Church members donated their old eyeglasses and gave teeth with gold fillings and jewelry and watches to help buy the first radio time on Long Beach station KGER.

Later Richards presented daily live broadcasts of The Tabernacle of the Air over KGER in Long Beach, California, and live weekly remote broadcasts from his tabernacle to KMPC (AM) in Beverly Hills.

In January 1937, the broadcast footprint expanded over a network of several stations of the Don Lee Broadcasting System, and the name of the broadcast was changed to the Voice of Prophecy. The first Voice of Prophecy coast-to-coast broadcast was over 89 stations of the Mutual Broadcasting System on Sunday, January 4, 1942. It was one of the first religious programs to broadcast nationally.

Up until the early 1950s broadcasts were produced live. Mispronounced names and singer mistakes went out unedited to the listeners. By 1980, Richards had a $6 million budget. The Voice of Prophecy broadcast each Sunday to 700 stations around the world.

Throughout the years Voice of Prophecy broadcasts were marked by an opening theme song of "Lift Up the Trumpet" performed by the King's Heralds quartet and closed with Richard's poem "Have Faith in God" each week having a new verse written.

== Speakers ==
Richards, Sr. was speaker from 1929 to 1969. In 1969, Richards' son, Richards, Jr., succeeded him and was speaker from 1969 to 1992. Later speakers included Pastor Lonnie Melashenko, Fred Kinsey, and Shawn Boonstra.

Preceded by founder	Founder/Speaker/Director; H.M.S. Richards, Sr. October 19, 1929 - 1969	Succeeded by H.M.S. Richards, uJr.
Preceded by H.M.S. Richards, Sr.	Speaker/Director; H.M.S. Richards, Jr. 1969 - 1992	Succeeded by E. Lonnie Melashenko
Preceded by H.M.S. Richards, Jr.	Speaker/Director; E. Lonnie Melashenko; January 1993 - July 2008	Succeeded by Fred Kinsey
Preceded by E. Lonnie Melashanko	Speaker/Director; Fred Kinsey; September 2008 - April 2012	Succeeded by Shawn Boonstra
Preceded by Fred Kinsey	Speaker/Director; Shawn Boonstra; 2012 - 2025	Succeeded by Ken Norton

== Musicians ==
Various musicians perform on the broadcast. Female vocalist Del Delker began as a regular on the program since 1947. The male quartet King's Heralds also performed weekly on the program from 1936 until 1982. Wayne Hooper served as musical director until his retirement in 1980.

== Discover Bible School ==
A key program of Voice of Prophecy is the Discover Bible School. Introduced on February 1, 1942, as The Bible School of the Air, it was one of the first correspondence Bible schools in North America.

Later known as the Discover Bible School, it offers free Bible guides by mail or online and has affiliate schools in over 120 countries with lessons in over 80 languages and dialects.

In 2010, the Bible School celebrated its one millionth graduate.

== Evangelists ==
Jim Reinking became a Voice of Prophecy evangelist in 1998 and served the ministry for 13 years.

== See also ==
- 28 fundamental beliefs
- Biblical Research Institute
- History of the Seventh-day Adventist Church
- List of religions and religious denominations
- List of Seventh-day Adventist hospitals
- List of Seventh-day Adventist medical schools
- List of Seventh-day Adventist secondary schools
- List of Christian denominations
- Questions on Doctrine
- Seventh-day Adventist Church
- Seventh-day Adventist eschatology
- Seventh-day Adventist theology
