= Pacific Press Publishing Association =

Seventh-day Adventist publishing house

- Type: Private
- Industry: Publishing
- Genre: Religious
- Founded: Oakland, California (1874)
- Founder: James White
- Headquarters: Nampa, Idaho, USA
- Area served: World
- Key people: Dale Galusha, President
- Products: Books, Magazines, CDs, DVDs, Tracts
- Website: www.pacificpress.com

The Pacific Press Publishing Association, or Pacific Press for short, is the only remaining Seventh-day Adventist publishing house in North America, following its absorption of Review & Herald in 2014. It was founded in 1874 by James White in Oakland, California, and is now located in Nampa, Idaho. Its titles include theological works as well as books on topics such as vegetarianism and home schooling and owns its own printing operation. It is owned by the North American Division of the Seventh-day Adventists.

== History ==
=== Establishment in California ===
The Seventh-day Adventist Church was formally organized and named in 1863. It began to realize its great mission to go into all the world and preach the gospel. Consequently, Elders J. N. Loughborough and D. T. Bourdeau came to California in 1866, and by May 1871, there were 130 Adventists in California in the San Francisco and Santa Rosa areas.

Late in 1872, James and Ellen White and their two sons, Willie and James Edson, came to California in the interest of the newly established work of the church on the Pacific Coast. Plans were laid for the establishment of a health institute and a branch publishing house. However, no funds were available, nor was a site yet secured.

One day while crossing the ferry from San Francisco to Oakland, Mrs. White through inspiration spoke to her husband. "Somewhere in Oakland", she said, "is the place to locate the paper."

So, in 1874, James White began to publish the Signs of the Times in Oakland. It was printed under the aegis of "Elder James White, Editor and Proprietor". The date of the first issue was June 4, 1874. The subscription price "$2.00 a year to all those able to pay the subscription price, and free to all others as far as the paper is sustained by donations of liberal friends of the cause." These were the terms.

In the fall of 1874 at a camp meeting in Yountville, the president of the California Conference, Elder Loughborough, presented the need of a publishing house to the people assembled. That day $19,414 was given in gold and in pledges. There were less than 500 members in the congregation.

Soon, construction of a plant on Castro Street in Oakland began. This became known as the Pacific Seventh-day Adventist Publishing Association. Equipment installed included a four-roller air spring drum cylinder press powered by an upright donkey engine, a paper cutter, a book trimmer, and some new type. Soon the Signs of the Times circulation had passed 4,000.

By 1887, the investment of Pacific Press had grown to $200,000, and the annual business totaled $150,000. From its beginning, the Press prospered. The press became well known on the West Coast for its quality work and prompt delivery of printing orders.

Around the start of the 20th century, the subscription list of Signs of the Times was nearly 50,000. Retail sales of the book department amounted to $94,000. However, commercial work continued to occupy an important place in production. At times, denominational work was set aside to accommodate the commercial. It was felt that commercial work was necessary to keep the machinery going and profits coming in.

Mrs. White encouraged management to move away from the city, which was developing so rapidly around the plant. The town of Mountain View wished to raise its status in the state. The town leaders, upon hearing that the Pacific Seventh-day Adventist Publishing Association in Oakland, which had gained a fair and growing reputation, was looking for a more rural atmosphere in which to establish itself, offered the Press five choice acres of land as well as a pair of lots for a church or meeting house.

The Press accepted the offer of the 5 acres (20,000 m^{2}) of land, and in 1904 they moved to Mountain View. Along with the plant came the families. As a result, real estate in Mountain View began to advance, and area business grew.

A brick building soon took shape on the land donated by the town, and work began to come in from customers who patronized the plant in Oakland. Mrs. White implored Management to rely on God alone and give up the commercial work that had followed them from Oakland and had received priority over church publications.

At 5:18 in the morning of April 18, 1906, a great earthquake convulsed the whole bay area. The walls of the plant crumbled. Its offices were in shambles. However, within a few days the presses were running again.

On July 20, three months after the earthquake, on a Friday about midnight, a fire of undetermined origin broke through the roof in the northeast corner of the photoengraving room. In two hours the entire building had become a blazing inferno. Although the fire was finally subdued, it was not entirely extinguished, and it broke out a second time. This time scarcely a charred board remained. The paper stock of the plant, finished books, type plates, manuscripts – all were destroyed.

Suddenly, all the warnings of Mrs. White came to mind. Soon after the fire the Board of Directors stopped commercial work at the Pacific Press.

In 1955 ownership of Chapel Records was transferred from the Pacific Union Conference of Seventh-Day Adventists to Pacific Press Publishing Association.

In 1982, the press lost an appeal in a case against the Equal Employment Opportunity Commission, wherein the Court of Appeals denied that the press could obtain a Title VII exemption to the employment code that would allow them to treat male and female employees differently.

=== Move to Idaho ===
By the early 1980s, the cost-of-living index in the densely populated San Francisco Bay area made it almost impossible for young families to work at the plant. This, among other reasons, made it expedient to move the plant from Mountain View. In 1983, the Board of Trustees, along with the General Conference Committee voted that the plant be sold and a move made to another area. Nampa, Idaho, was chosen as the location for the new plant. The new building contained 180,780 square feet (16,795 m^{2}) of floor space. Relocation to Idaho began in June 1984 and was completed in the late winter of 1984-85.

The move to Idaho was an advantageous one. From the humble beginning in 1874 when the first Signs of the Times was issued, with Elder James White editing the paper, setting the type, and printing the pages, and with his son as a delivery boy, the institution has grown to become the employer of over 250 workers at a plant larger than three football fields and generating an annual income of over $40 million. Pacific Press is the largest bulk mailer in Idaho.

In 1994, Pacific Press began management of literature evangelist work with the establishment of the HHES (Home Health Education Services) Division. Currently, the HHES manages literature evangelist programs for Pacific Union, North Pacific Union, and Mid America Union.

== Retail Division ==
The Retail Division for management of Adventist Book Centers was begun in 1996. The Division operated retail locations in the U.S. and Canada, and operated a bookmobile program in the mountain states region. In August, 2013, the Pacific Press board voted to return management of the stores operated by the Retail Division to the local Seventh-day Adventist conferences. Pacific Press closed the last of its Retail Division in the United States in the second half of 2014. Operations in Canada are expected to be closed by year end.

== See also ==
- Review and Herald Publishing Association
- Seventh-day Adventist Church
- Signs of the Times Publishing Association (Taiwan)
