= Arthur L. White =

American writer and theologist (1907–1991)

Arthur Lacey White
- Born: October 7, 1907
- Died: January 12, 1991 (aged 83); Angwin, California
- Occupations: Writer; Teacher; Preacher
- Spouse: Frieda White

Arthur Lacey White (1907–1991) was an American Seventh-day Adventist writer, and theology professor, noted for his service to the Ellen G. White Estate.

== Early life and education ==
One of seven grandchildren of James Springer White and Ellen G. White, Arthur White was born to William C. White and Ethel May White on October 7, 1907. He grew up in Pratt Valley, just below the St. Helena Sanitarium in northern California. He earned a certificate in business administration in 1928 from Pacific Union College and that same year married a classmate, Frieda Belle Swingle. They moved to Madison College, an Adventist school in Tennessee, but only for about a year.

== Career at the Ellen G. White Estate ==
The following year Arthur was called to the office of the Ellen G. White Estate at Elmshaven to serve as accountant and general assistant to his 74-year-old father W. C. White, one of five church leaders appointed by Ellen White in her will to administer her estate. During the next nine years Arthur was given increasing responsibilities, and in 1933 he was appointed assistant secretary of the board. Shortly after the death of W. C. White in late 1937, Arthur was elected as a life member of the board and secretary of the estate, a position he held for 41 years.

Shortly after his promotion, Arthur White supervised the transfer of the office of the E. G. White Estate from Elmshaven near Angwin, California to the world headquarters of the Seventh-day Adventist Church in Washington, D.C. His principal contributions to work of the Estate included working with the world field in the development of the available Spirit of Prophecy literature and assembling E. G. White materials for publication in compilations such as Evangelism, The Adventist Home, and Selected Messages, and the creation of the three-volume Comprehensive Index to the Writings of Ellen G. White.

Arthur White also taught at the Seventh-day Adventist Theological Seminary in Washington, DC, at Andrews University in Michigan and in overseas Seminary Extension Schools. In 1973 Andrews University conferred on him the honorary degree of Doctor of Divinity.

In 1966 the White Estate board of trustees, in counsel with the General Conference of Seventh-day Adventists officers, asked White to author a definitive biography of Ellen White. Hesitant because of his personal relationship to the subject of the biography, but conditioned by his stance taken early in his ministry that he would relate to Ellen White as would any other loyal Seventh-day Adventist, viewing her as “Sister White” and not as “my grandmother,” he accepted the assignment and in 1978 he resigned as secretary of the Ellen G. White Estate to focus on the biography project. Adhering to a careful schedule, he produced one volume each year for six years working from home but accessing the White Estate vault nearby.

Together with E. A. Sutherland, he also wrote From city to country living : a guide to those making the change.

After the biography was completed Arthur and Frieda White retired near Angwin, California, above the St. Helena Health Center and the Pratt Valley, where Arthur was born. Six years later, on January 12, 1991, he died at the age of 83.

== Publications ==
In his retirement years he produced a six-volume biography of his grandmother entitled, Ellen G. White: A Biography (Review and Herald, 1981–1986)

Ellen G. White: A Biography

- The Early Years: 1827-1862 (vol. 1)
- The Progressive Years: 1862-1876 (vol. 2)
- The Lonely Years: 1876-1891 (vol. 3)
- The Australian Years: 1891-1900 (vol. 4)
- The Early Elmshaven Years: 1900-1905 (vol. 5)
- The Later Elmshaven Years: 1905-1915 (vol. 6)

== See also ==
- Teachings of Ellen G. White
- Inspiration of Ellen G. White
- Seventh-day Adventist Church Pioneers

Preceded by William C. White	Secretary of the Ellen G. White Estate; 1937–1978	Succeeded by Robert W. Olson
