= Robert W. Olson =

American Seventh-day Adventist leader

- Born: October 25, 1920
- Died: April 16, 2013 (aged 92); Hendersonville, North Carolina
- Occupations: Seventh-day Adventist; Preacher

Robert W. Olson (October 25, 1920 – April 16, 2013 in Hendersonville, North Carolina) was an American Seventh-day Adventist leader who was director of the Ellen G. White Estate from 1978 to 1990.

== Biography ==
Olson was the first staff member who was not a direct descendant of Ellen G. White to run her estate and the first staff member to hold a Ph.D. He had a wide variety of pastoral and administrative posts before joining the White Estate in the early 1970s. His leadership was characterized by a new openness to her writings (including the release of the controversial "Z file") and the release and publication of Ellen White's published writings on CD-ROM.

== Publications ==
- "101 Questions on the Sanctuary and on Ellen White" (PDF) (Washington, D.C.: Ellen G. White Estate, March 1981). Also appeared as a supplement to the Australasian Record of June 8, 1981)
- "The 'Shut Door' Documents" compilation, with occasional commentary. White Estate, 1982
- The Crisis Ahead: A Compilation From The Writings Of Ellen G. White, 1974 Published by College Bookstore, Angwin, California

== See also ==
- Ellen G. White Estate
- Seventh-day Adventist Church
- Seventh-day Adventist theology
- Seventh-day Adventist eschatology
- History of the Seventh-day Adventist Church
- Teachings of Ellen G. White
- Inspiration of Ellen G. White
- Prophecy in the Seventh-day Adventist Church
- Investigative judgment
- Pillars of Adventism
- Second Coming
- Ellen G. White
- Adventism
- Seventh-day Adventist Church Pioneers
- Seventh-day Adventist worship

Preceded by Arthur L. White	Secretary of the Ellen G. White Estate; 1978–1990	Succeeded by Paul A. Gordon
