= Ralph Mackin =

Ralph Mackin was a Seventh-day Adventist from Ohio, United States. He and his wife claimed to experience gifts of the Holy Spirit such as prophecy, speaking in tongues, and even casting out demons. They caused a stir at a local Adventist camp meeting, which was reported in the local newspaper. They later sought the counsel of Ellen G. White, whom Adventists believe had the gift of prophecy. White was initially cautious regarding their experiences, and later came out opposed to them. After leading some meetings at an Adventist church for a time, they pass from prominence in the church.

== Biography ==
Ralph Mackin was born February 6, 1875 near Toledo, Ohio, US, to John Mackin and Mary Augusta Terwilliger. His parents divorced by 1880. In 1887 his mother married John M Underwood.

Ralph married Mamie (Mary) C Levin on April 18, 1899 in Kansas City, Missouri. The following year they were living in Findlay, Ohio, where he was a chiropractic physician managing a sanitarium providing hydrotherapy and massage services under the auspices of the Seventh-day Adventist Church. Two daughters, Zelma Rowena and Marie M, were born to them.

== Conflict and Journey at Elmshaven ==
In 1908 conflict arose as a result of their promotion of speaking in tongues and deliverance ministry. Nearly three years earlier their Findlay, Ohio church sought "the outpouring of the Holy Spirit." They studied the Bible and Ellen White's writings, seeking a "blessing of sanctification" which they received in the form of speaking in tongues as in Acts 2.

The Mackins had visited a family in Clyde who also received the "blessing", marked by weeping in many of them. A "little girl ten or eleven years old" told them "through the Spirit of prophecy", "You go to Toledo". They were also told imprisonment would ensue there. In Toledo a Polish Catholic heard Mrs. Mackin in his own tongue. When the Mackins returned to Clyde they were arrested for mesmerism. This occurred six or eight weeks before seeing the Whites.

They caused a stir at the Adventist camp meeting in Mansfield, Ohio, which resulted in the arrests of the Mackins, plus their daughter, Ralph's mother, and "Sister Edwards". They believed the Spirit had told Mrs. Mackin to go to the campground and sing, "only as she prays in the Spirit and special power comes upon her." However they were arrested for disturbance. In court, one witness testified, "I never heard such singing in my life. It just thrilled me through and through." Supporters had stated, "It is when the singing is extemporaneous – dictated by the Spirit – that it is the most wonderful." (They also claimed the gift of tongues, with Ralph speaking Chinese and his wife Yiddish as the result of a vision;)

On November 11, 1908 Mr. and Mrs. Mackin called on Willie White who served as secretary for his mother, Ellen G White seeking counsel and approval of their experience. He arranged a meeting for the following morning. Ralph stated, "If we are in a delusion, we want to know it, just as much as if we were in the right." His wife added, "Our brethren certainly think that we are in a delusion."

They read numerous passages from the Bible, and some experiences of Ellen White. They also spoke of casting out demons:

"The Lord instructs us to lay the people down, lest the demons throw them when they come out. We found in the beginning that when we begin to rebuke these demons they oftentimes close the eyes of these people, and will sometimes cause them to bark like a dog, and stick out their tongue; but as we continue to rebuke them, why, the eyes open and they become calm".

(White later rebuked them:

"The work of declaring persons possessed of the devil, and then praying with them and pretending to cast out the evil spirits, is fanaticism which will bring into disrepute any church which sanctions such work.")

Ellen White expressed her caution, sharing how past experiences had made her "fearful of anything savoring of a spirit of fanaticism." It had tarnished the church's image, taking "years to outlive the influence that these exhibitions of fanaticism had upon the general public." She said they should focus on sharing the Bible: "We must direct the minds of the people to the Word as the foundation of our faith...It is through the Word—-not feeling, not excitement— that we want to influence the people to obey the truth. On the platform of God's Word we can stand with safety."

The meeting concluded, and the following day the Mackins went to San Jose. Ralph was invited to preach at the church there, and meetings continued for several days until the pastor returned and stopped them, following which Ralph continued to hold meetings in supporters' homes.

Two weeks later Ellen wrote to S. N. Haskell, "before the end" some " will treat as something of great importance these peculiar manifestations, which are not of God, but which are calculated to divert the minds of many away from the teachings of the Word." Later, "God's work is ever characterized by calmness and dignity."

In December Ellen White received one or two visions about the case, and wrote two letters on the 11th, one to the Mackins and one to "Our Brethren in California". To the Mackins she wrote in part, "You suppose that all you do is for the glory of God, but you are deceiving yourselves and deceiving others... You attempt to make the truth of God sustain false sentiments and incorrect actions that are inconsistent and fanatical." She also wrote, "I was bidden to speak decidedly against this fanatical work." She was concerned that fanaticism would give the church a bad image:

"I was shown that it was not the Spirit of the Lord that was inspiring Brother and Sister Mackin, but the same spirit of fanaticism that is ever seeking entrance into the remnant church."

== Afterwards ==
The Mackins relocated shortly after their return from California, first to Sandusky and then to Canton, Ohio. For the next decade they operated a sanitarium and bath house there. Mary served first as his assistant and then is listed as a chiropractor herself. By 1927, they had divorced and Ralph married Julia Arnold. Mary continued living and working in Canton but Ralph relocated to Louisville, OH. He died in 1961.

== See also ==
- Charismatic Adventism
- Prophecy in the Seventh-day Adventist Church
- Tongues in the Seventh-day Adventist Church
