= Spirit of Prophecy =

Spirit of Prophecy may refer to:

- Spirit of Prophecy (Latter Day Saints)
- Inspiration of Ellen White#Spirit of prophecy, a term sometimes used by Seventh-day Adventists to refer to the Holy Spirit and to Ellen White and her writings
