= Elmshaven =

House museum in California

- Elmshaven (Ellen G. White House)
- U.S. National Register of Historic Places
- U.S. National Historic Landmark District
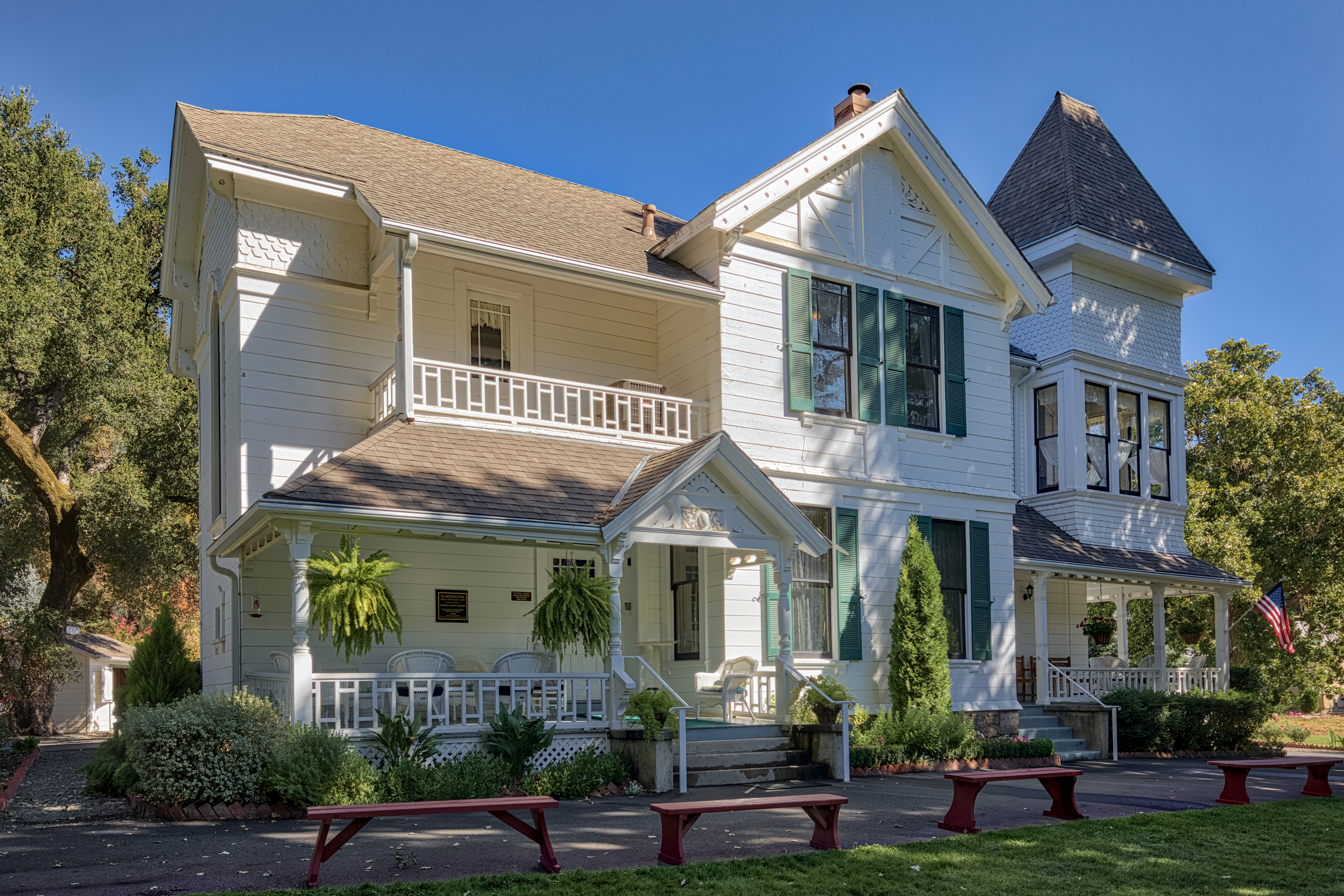
- Elmshaven, 125 Glass Mountain Ln., St. Helena, California

- Location within California Location within the United States
- Location: 125 Glass Mountain Ln., St. Helena, California
- Coordinates: 38°32′14.6″N 122°28′44.6″W
- Area: 3 acres (1.2 ha)
- Architect: Robert Pratt
- Architectural style: Victorian
- NRHP reference No.: 93001609

Significant dates
- Added to NRHP: November 04, 1993
- Designated NHLD: November 4, 1993

Elmshaven is a historic house museum at 125 Glass Mountain Lane in St. Helena, California, United States. Also known as Ellen White House or Robert Pratt Place, it was the home of Ellen G. White from 1900 until her death in 1915. She was notable for her prophetic ministry, which was instrumental in founding the Sabbatarian Adventist movement that led to the rise of the Seventh-day Adventist Church, and for her advocacy in favor of the establishment of medical clinics. It is now owned and operated by the Seventh-day Adventist Church as an Adventist historic site, and was designated a National Historic Landmark in 1993.

== Description and history ==
Elmshaven is located in a rural-residential area north of downtown St. Helena, on the east side of Glass Mountain Lane. The main house is a two-story frame structure built of redwood and finished in shiplap siding. Stylistically it is a vernacular expression of Victorian architecture, with a square turret at the right front corner, capped by a pyramidal roof. The central portion of the main facade is a projecting gable section, with the main entrance to its left, sheltered by a porch with decorative railings on two levels. The interior retains many features original to either its construction or the period of Ellen White's ownership. The property also includes a tank house for a large water tank, and a two-story wood-frame outbuilding used as an office, library, and storage vault.

The house was built in 1885 by Robert H. Pratt and was initially known as the Robert Pratt Place. Ellen White purchased the home in 1900, naming it "Elmshaven" after the row of elm trees at its front. She lived there until her death in 1915. Of the places White lived, it is the best-preserved, and the one where she lived the longest. It was declared a National Historic Landmark in 1993.

In 2020, wildfires threatened Elmshaven but it was not damaged.

== See also ==
- List of National Historic Landmarks in California
- National Register of Historic Places listings in Napa County, California

== See also ==
- Sunnyside Historical Home, the Australian residence of E. G. White, also a museum.
