= Prophecy in the Seventh-day Adventist Church =

Seventh-day Adventists believe that Ellen G. White, one of the church's co-founders, was a prophetess, understood today as an expression of the New Testament spiritual gift of prophecy.

Seventh-day Adventist believe that White had the spiritual gift of prophecy, but that her writings are a lesser light to the Bible, which has ultimate authority. According to the 28 Fundamentals the core set of theological beliefs held by the Seventh-day Adventist Church, states that Adventists accept the Bible as their only creed and can be read online on the website of the Seventh-day Adventist Church.

The 18th of the 28 Fundamentals states the Adventists viewpoint on the Gift of Prophecy:

One of the gifts of the Holy Spirit is prophecy. This gift is an identifying mark of the remnant church and was manifested in the ministry of Ellen. G. White. As the Lord's messenger, her writings are a continuing and authoritative source of truth which provide for the church comfort, guidance, instruction, and correction. They also make clear that the Bible is the standard by which all teaching and experience must be tested. (Joel 2:28, 29; Acts 2:14-21; Heb. 1:1-3; Rev. 12:17; 19:10.).

According to one church document, "her expositions on any given Bible passage offer an inspired guide to the meaning of texts without exhausting their meaning or preempting the task of exegesis". In other words, White's writings are considered an inspired commentary on Scripture, although Scripture remains ultimately authoritative.

Adventist believe she had the spiritual gift of prophecy as outlined in Revelation 19:10. Her restorationist writings endeavor to showcase the hand of God in Christian history. This cosmic conflict, referred to as the "Great Controversy theme", is foundational to the development of Seventh-day Adventist theology.

== Viewpoints ==
"The Inspiration and Authority of the Ellen G. White Writings", document was issued by the Biblical Research Institute of the General Conference of Seventh-day Adventists. It has received worldwide review and input, although is not an official statement. It concludes that a proper understanding will avoid the two extremes of regarding her "writings as functioning on a canonical level identical with Scripture, or […] considering them as ordinary Christian literature."

Seventh-day Adventists believe White was inspired by God, while most non-Adventists believe that she was not. Adventist scholars today agree that:

- she was inspired by God
- her writings are important to the church today
- the Holy Spirit who inspired Bible writers, also inspired Ellen G. White

Alberto Timm, rector at the Latin-American Adventist Theological Seminary in Brasilia, Brazil, believes that since the passing of Ellen White, "as far as we know, there is no genuine prophet alive in our days".

== History ==
Numerous Seventh-day Adventists have claimed the gift of prophecy throughout the history of the church, but only Ellen White is held by the church to have had the spiritual gift of prophecy.

=== Millerites ===
Seventh-day Adventists arose out of the Millerite movement, the followers of William Miller who expected the end of the world around 1843 or 1844. A number of the Millerites claimed the gift of prophecy.

Two Millerites claimed to have had visions prior to Ellen White – William Ellis Foy (1818–1893), and Hazen Foss (1818?–1893), Ellen White's brother-in-law. Adventists believe the gift offered to these two men was instead passed on to White. This was because the men kept their visions to themselves but when Ellen White revealed hers, it was the same as theirs.

Of the women visionaries, several made the press for their visions. The other known prophets are female: Dorinda Baker (associated with the Israel Dammon incident), Emily Clemons, Phoebe Knapp, and Mary Hamlin, who are all mentioned in newspapers of the time.

However most Adventists only believe Ellen White had the spiritual gift of prophecy.

==== William Foy ====
William Ellis Foy (1818–1893) was an African American Freewill Baptist minister and preacher in the Millerite movement, who claimed to receive four visions from 1842 (two visions) to 1844. A tall man, he was the first of three Millerites to claim visions around the time of the 1844 "Great Disappointment".

A common theme of his visions was that the Second Coming would come later than the Millerites expected. They inspired many people through the Great Disappointment when Jesus did not return as they had expected. Ellen White supported his visions. They also concern the judgment, and rewards for the righteous.

He claimed visions in January and February 1842, told in his autobiography The Christian Experience of William E. Foy, published 1845. They were similar to those experienced by Ellen White.

Foy was reluctant to obey his commission to share the visions, yet did eventually. He never became a Seventh-day Adventist, and his subsequent history was unknown. J. N. Loughborough's account was simply repeated by later historians (e.g. Light Bearers, 64) until Delbert Baker's definitive 1987 biography The Unknown Prophet traced his subsequent history.

==== Hazen Foss ====
Hazen Foss (1818–1893) was another Millerite who claimed to receive several visions. However he refused to proclaim them, and God told him he was "released" from that ministry, and the message given to Ellen White instead. He was Ellen White's brother-in-law. Adventists tend to believe the prophetic gift offered to these two men was instead passed on to White.

=== Early Adventists ===
Adventists believe Hiram Edson received a vision about the heavenly sanctuary or investigative judgment on October 23, 1844 – the day following the "Great Disappointment". He wrote,

"...while passing through a large field I was stopped about midway of the field. Heaven seemed open to my view, and I saw distinctly and clearly..." Jesus as High Priest

Moses Hull (c. 1836–1907) was an eloquent speaker and apologist (defender of Adventist beliefs). He converted to Adventism in 1857, but later converted to spiritualism (the key feature of which is allegedly contacting the dead), leaving the church. He claimed to write as influenced by spirits.

For two years prior, Ellen White had trying to help Moses Hull and been warning him on his focus and "overweening trust in his own abilities." Hull sensed his problem and asked for Ellen White and others to come to his Battle Creek home to pray for him. Ellen writes "I was shown the condition of Bro. Hull. He was in an alarming state. His lack of consecration and vital piety left him subject to Satan's suggestions. . . . He is asleep to his own danger. . . . He was presented to me as standing upon the brink of an awful gulf, ready to leap. If he takes the leap, it will be final; his eternal destiny will be fixed. . . . Never should one man be sent forth alone to combat with a Spiritualist."

=== Ellen White ===
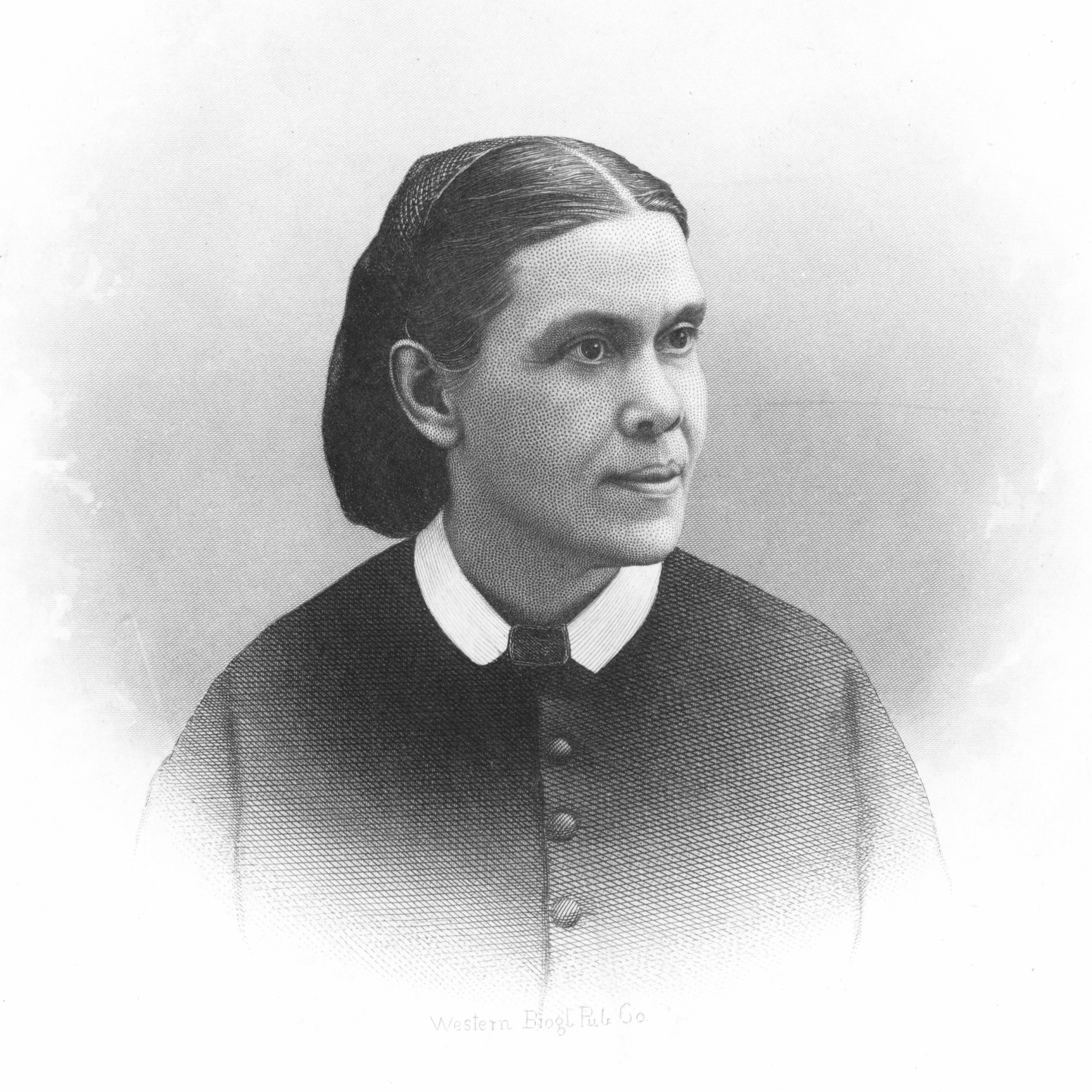

Adventists believe church co-founder Ellen G. White was a prophet, understood today as the New Testament "gift of prophecy". White preferred to describe herself as a "messenger".

She was one of about 200 claimed prophets in New England at the time. For alleged miracles which occurred during her prophecies, see: inspiration of Ellen White#Tests of her inspiration.

White regarded herself as a messenger to the church of the end times. She believed her contemporary prophets were not legitimate.

=== E. J. Waggoner ===
E. J. Waggoner claimed "a revelation direct from heaven" at a campmeeting in Healdsburg, California in 1882. In the midst of another's sermon,

...an experience came to me that was the turning point in my life. Suddenly a light shone about me, and the tent seemed illumined, as though the sun were shining; I saw Christ crucified for me, and to me was revealed for the first time in my life the fact that God loved me, and that Christ gave Himself for me personally.

In 1899 he claimed that all commandment keepers should have the gift of prophecy.

=== After 1888 ===
The 1888 Minneapolis General Conference provided "impetus" to those radically seeking God's presence.

==== Anna Phillips ====
Anna Rice Phillips (1865–1926) was a claimed new prophetess, who was supported by W. W. Prescott and others. From Ogden, Utah, she first claimed visions in 1891, and in April, 1894, Adventist minister A.T. Jones presented Anna Phillips's testimonies as a genuine manifestation of the spirit of prophecy. However the next day he got a letter from Ellen White which convinced the church she was sincere yet mistaken. Anna Phillips repudiated her experience and became a trusted Bible worker.

==== Others ====
By the 1890s, a "flood of volunteers" stepped forward, hoping to be the next prophet. However Ellen White usually responded to them that she had been given no "light" about the future prophetic gift.

Fannie Bolton, a former literary assistant to White, claimed visions around the end of the 1800s.

In the 1900s, Mrs. Mackin claimed the gift of prophecy, and under her and her husband Ralph's influence, a young girl (a family friend) also prophesied; see: Ralph and Mrs. Mackin.

==== Anna Garmire ====
Anna Garmire (b. 1870) from Petoskey, Michigan claimed visions. She believed the close of probation would occur 40 years after the Great Disappointment. Her father James M. stole the Review and Herald mailing list and sent out this prediction to 20,000 people. Ellen White rejected Anna's theories, and authored the tract, An Exposure of Fanaticism and Wickedness in response. After 1884 passed, James wrote to Ellen White and she responded to their predictions critically. The Garmires influenced others in this way until as late as 1900.

==== German Reform Movement ====
In Germany in 1915 Johann Wick, an Imperial Army member, claimed a vision of the close of probation "at the time the stone-fruit trees blossomed in the spring." Other lay people also reported similar visions and some became involved in the Seventh Day Adventist Reform Movement.

=== After Ellen White ===
Ellen White died in 1915. According to her son Willie White, subsequently "A dozen or more persons" claimed the gift, to succeed Ellen. He considered some "good-hearted but misguided", but others fanatical and who denounced those remaining unconvinced by their claims.

==== Margaret Rowen ====
Margaret W. Rowen claimed to receive visions, and formed an alternative short-lived church, the Reformed Seventh-day Adventist Church (not to be confused with the much more significant Seventh Day Adventist Reform Movement).

Rowen became an Adventist in 1912. She claimed to receive her first vision on June 22, 1916 which she shared with members of a prayer group at her South Side Los Angeles Church, gaining a small following. Several church leaders, especially Dr. Bert E. Fullmer, supported her. A periodical The Reform Advocate and Prayer Band Appeal was printed. The Southern California Conference investigated the claims, but was originally inconclusive. She authored A Stirring Message for the Time (Pasadena, California: The Grant Press, 1918). In 1918, A. G. Daniells reported the investigators had concluded her visions were not of heavenly origin. The following year Rowen, Fullmer, a physician, and at least two other ministers were disfellowshipped.

In 1920, a false document was planted by Fullmer (under Rowen's directive) in the Ellen G. White Estate files in White's home. Dated 1911 and supposedly written by White, it announced Rowen as a succeeding prophetess. At its peak, the movement had around 1000 followers. Rowen gave several false predictions. Fullmer authored Bearing Witness (Los Angeles: The Reform Press, 1923). In 1925, Fullmer admitted the fraudulent letter. In the March 1926 issue of the periodical, he presented his conclusion that Rowen was a fraud. In response, she conspired to murder him the following year, but was unsuccessful. She served a one-year sentence in the San Quentin State Prison in California, by which time her movement had fallen apart.

==== Others ====
Numerous leaders of offshoot groups have also claimed the gift of prophecy for themselves, for example Victor Houteff, founder of the Shepherd's Rod offshoot. Benjamin Roden was another, founder of the Branch Davidian offshoot of Shepherd's Rod, whose wife Lois Roden succeeded him as prophetess, and claimed a vision about the feminity of the Holy Spirit. David Koresh considered himself the final prophet. He apparently saw himself as Ellen White's successor. Wayne Bent, the leader of the Lord Our Righteousness Church which has been described as a cult, has claimed God has spoken to him. He is known as Wayne Travesser within that community. In 1990 Pastor Walter McGill claimed a "divine revelation" in taking the name Creation Seventh Day Adventist Church when he and his associates formed their break-away church.

Amateur archaeologist Ron Wyatt claimed to meet "at least" an angel, and another time four angels. Former Adventist William S. Sadler was a sceptic of psychic phenomena generally, but was involved with The Urantia Book, which was claimed to be inspired by celestial beings. Others have claimed to hear the voice of God, for example, Robert Brinsmead's father Cedric claimed to hear voices saying, "Go north, young man." after which the family moved. Chinese Adventist David Lin claims his mother was told by a voice to go to Tianjin.

Author Herbert Douglass wrote in 1998, "At any given time in the last few decades, at least a dozen people around the world have convinced others that they have been given the gift of prophecy."

Adventist author Clifford Goldstein has described some "nut cases" and meeting "some of the weirdest and most bizarre folks you could imagine", with these types of claims.

== See also ==
- Charismatic Adventism
- List of Ellen G. White writings
- New religious movement
- Premillennialism
- Sabbath in seventh-day churches
- Seventh-day Adventist eschatology
- Seventh-day Adventist Interfaith Relations
- Seventh-day Adventist worship
- Teachings of Ellen G. White
- Tongues in the Seventh-day Adventist Church
