= Adventist Baptismal Vow =

Statement of faith used for initiation by Seventh-day Adventists

The Seventh-day Adventist baptismal vow is a list of 13 belief statements which a person joining the Seventh-day Adventist Church is given and accepts at believer's baptism. In Adventist understanding, baptism (a public display of faith in Christ), is associated with officially joining the Adventist church, which is a part of the community of believers in Christ. The vow is explained in the church manual. In 2005 an alternate vow consisting of three statements was approved at the General Conference Session, and the baptizing pastor now has a choice of which set to use. They complement the 28 Fundamentals.

== Baptismal vows ==
- 1.Do you believe there is one God: Father, Son, and Holy Spirit, a unity of three coeternal Persons?
- 2.Do you accept the death of Jesus Christ on Calvary as the atoning sacrifice for your sins and believe that by God’s grace through faith in His shed blood you are saved from sin and its penalty?
- 3.Do you accept Jesus Christ as your Lord and personal Saviour believing that God, in Christ, has forgiven your sins and given you a new heart, and do you renounce the sinful ways of the world?
- 4.Do you accept by faith the righteousness of Christ, your Intercessor in the heavenly sanctuary, and accept His promise of transforming grace and power to live a loving, Christ-centered life in your home and before the world?
- 5.Do you believe that the Bible is God’s inspired Word, the only rule of faith and practice for the Christian? Do you covenant to spend time regularly in prayer and Bible study?
- 6.Do you accept the Ten Commandments as a transcript of the character of God and a revelation of His will? Is it your purpose by the power of the indwelling Christ to keep this law, including the fourth commandment, which requires the observance of the seventh day of the week as the Sabbath of the Lord and the memorial of Creation?
- 7. Do you look forward to the soon coming of Jesus and the blessed hope when “this mortal shall . . . put on immortality”? As you prepare to meet the Lord, will you witness to His loving salvation by using your talents in personal soul-winning endeavor to help others to be ready for His glorious appearing?
- 8. Do you accept the biblical teaching of spiritual gifts and believe that the gift of prophecy is one of the identifying marks of the remnant church?
- 9.Do you believe in church organization? Is it your purpose to worship God and to support the church through your tithes and offerings and by your personal effort and influence?
- 10. Do you believe that your body is the temple of the Holy Spirit; and will you honor God by caring for it, avoiding the use of that which is harmful; abstaining from all unclean foods; from the use, manufacture, or sale of alcoholic beverages; the use, manufacture, or sale of tobacco in any of its forms for human consumption; and from the misuse of or trafficking in narcotics or other drugs?
- 11. Do you know and understand the fundamental Bible principles as taught by the Seventh-day Adventist Church? Do you purpose, by the grace of God, to fulfill His will by ordering your life in harmony with these principles?
- 12. Do you accept the New Testament teaching of baptism by immersion and desire to be so baptized as a public expression of faith in Christ and His forgiveness of your sins?
- 13. Do you accept and believe that the Seventh-day Adventist Church is the remnant church of Bible prophecy and that people of every nation, race, and language are invited and accepted into its fellowship? Do you desire to be a member of this local congregation of the world church?

== Alternative vow ==
An alternative baptismal vow was introduced in 2005. It originated with the South Pacific Division branch of the Biblical Research Committee. It consists of the following three affirmations:

- Do you accept Jesus Christ as your personal Savior and Lord, and do you desire to live your life in a saving relationship with Him?
- Do you accept the teachings of the Bible as expressed in the Statement of Fundamental Beliefs of the Seventh-day Adventist Church and do you pledge by God’s grace to live your life in harmony with these teachings?
- Do you desire to be baptized as a public expression of your belief in Jesus Christ, to be accepted into the fellowship of the Seventh-day Adventist Church, and to support the church and its mission as a faithful steward by your personal influence, tithes and offerings, and a life of service?

A caution was expressed by Dr. Brian Bull on theological grounds, where he states "who worried that placing the wording 'as expressed in the Statement of Fundamental Beliefs' led to the danger of the church turning the fundamentals into a creed." Other delegates expressed concerns that the alternative vow was not detailed enough, but it was passed because of its optional nature. The choice of which vow to use is at the discretion of the pastor preparing the baptismal candidate.

== History of baptismal confession in the Christian church ==
One of the earliest mentions of a public confession is found in 1 Timothy 6:12. "Fight the good fight of faith; take hold of the eternal life to which you were called, and you made the good confession in the presence of many witnesses." The practice of baptismal confession finds its historical roots in the creeds of the Christian Church. The Apostles Creed provides an ancient example of such a creed. In an effort to show the value of various traditions, Tertullian describes the baptismal vow as practiced in his day: "When we are going to enter the water, but a little before, in the presence of the congregation and under the hand of the president, we solemnly profess that we disown the devil, and his pomp, and his angels." Public confession at baptism has been practiced throughout the history of the Christian Church. Infant baptism often included another person vowing for the infant to be faithful to Christ.

=== History of the baptismal vow in the Seventh-day Adventist Church ===
Adventists practice believers baptism rather than infant baptism. Believers at their baptism pledge or vow to follow Jesus. The pioneer Adventist leaders came from a variety of denominational traditions. Ellen G. White's had a Methodist background, while James White's was from the Christian Connexion. Prior to the establishment of the Seventh-day Adventist church, Millerite Adventists stated a vow at the time of their baptism. Though the exact wording is not recorded, Seventh-day Adventists continued the Christian practice of the baptismal vow.

In the March, 1920 edition of The Church Officer's Gazette, R. A. Underwood presents eleven questions for the examining of persons to be baptized and received into the church. His list, though numbering the same, is different than the 1941 list. Unlike that list, Underwood includes two questions regarding the Bible, a question on tithe, and one on the preservation of the body for service. His also has a question on the importance of a private prayer life.

The first official actions regarding a Baptismal Vow in the Seventh-day Adventist Church took place in the early 1940s. At the Sixteenth meeting, June 5, 1941, of the General Conference Session, Oliver Montgomery moved that a committee be appointed to report to the next Autumn Council on the adoption of a uniform baptismal covenant for the world church. He said that there were many different lists of questions used and printed in different parts of the world. The motion was carried. The committee was appointed June 8 of the same year and reported to the Autumn Council, October 27, 1941. The Council adopted the report. This included a list of twenty-seven fundamental beliefs and eleven questions for the baptismal vow. The questions regarding spiritual gifts and the body temple were not included in this 1941 list.

Vice-President of the General Conference of Seventh-day Adventists, William Henry Branson, reported in February, 1942, Ministry magazine the church's reason for adopting a uniform baptismal vow. The church was growing. The work of Adventists had extended into all parts of the world. Adventist members came from about 800 language groups and workers needed guidance in presenting church doctrines to those in their language. Branson said that there was an alarming lack of uniformity in these matters. Ministers were establishing their own tests of fellowship. He writes that the tests applied by one are different from those applied by another. One person required incoming members to promise full participation in church missionary activities. Another would prepare a set of questions that deal with minute details of what the new members are to eat, drink, and wear. They set up entry requirements which the church had never set up. He said that, "many points of Bible instruction on Christian experience, missionary activity, support of Christian education, etc., are to be taught prospective candidates, but obviously many of these matters do not constitute tests of fellowship that are to be applied to those who request baptism and membership." These matters should be taught persuasively but then left to each person's individual conscience. He stated that "not all that we as a people believe and teach has been incorporated into what is known among us as tests of fellowship, which tests must be satisfactorily passed by those who apply for membership in our church."

Oliver Montgomery, in the March, 1942, edition of Ministry, explained some of the committee's thinking. Similar to Branson's explanation, Montgomery distinguished between the many teachings valued by Seventh-day Adventist and those teachings which are considered tests of fellowship. Montgomery also explains why the many counsels of Ellen G. White, believed by Adventists to have the Biblical gift of prophecy, were not included in the Baptismal Vow. Montgomery states that "we have made no reference to the instruction given this people through the Spirit of prophecy in regard to many evils to be avoided and the right principles to be followed. On this point may I state that as a denomination, we hold to the fundamental Protestant principle of 'the Bible, and the Bible only" as our rule of faith and conduct. Every doctrine, every principle of faith, every truth of the gospel, every standard of righteousness, is found in the word of God. The Spirit of prophecy sheds wonderful light on the word of God. It magnifies the Word, and makes its meaning clearer and more beautiful. It is for our enlightenment and instruction. We recognize the divine source of this counsel and light. It is counsel from the Lord. It teaches, instructs, and admonishes. It clearly sets forth the right way, and the true principles, but does not legislate. It has never undertaken to establish baptismal requirements in the church. It is for the denomination to do this in its official capacity. Therefore, it seems clear that the personal or private interpretation of the teachings of the Spirit of prophecy should not be used or applied by an individual worker as a substitution for, or an addition to, accepted church standards as adopted by official action of the body."

== See also ==
- 28 Fundamentals, the fundamental beliefs of the Adventist church
- Seventh-day Adventist Church
- Adult/Believer's baptism
- Creed
- Ecclesiology, the study of church community
