= Teachings of Ellen G. White =

Ellen G. White, one of the co-founders of the Seventh-day Adventist Church, was extremely influential on the church, which considers her a prophet, understood today as an expression of the New Testament spiritual gift of prophecy. She was a voluminous writer and popular speaker on health and temperance. Her teachings are preserved today through over 50,000 manuscript pages of her writings, and the records of others.

== Theology ==
Her theology was Christ-centered, particularly since the 1888 Minneapolis General Conference.

Her religious cosmology was dominated by a Great Controversy theme, as outlined in her book The Great Controversy, first published in 1858. It describes a cosmic battle between good and evil, between Jesus Christ and Satan, covering the fall of Satan and his angels, the fall of man, and the salvation of sinful man through the crucifixion of Jesus and righteousness by faith.

Her eschatology includes the Second Advent of Christ and the resurrection of the dead, when the righteous, together with the living saints, will ascend to Paradise and live for 1,000 years. After this, the old Earth will be cleansed by Hell fire and become the New Earth where they will live eternally in bliss with God and the angels.

In line with the beliefs of the Seventh-day Adventist Church, Ellen White adhered to an Arminian theological framework, which entails a belief in conditional preservation of the saints and allows for a present assurance of salvation.

Regarding the Trinity, although she did not write using theological terminology and did not use the word "Trinity", she believed in one God existing in three coequal, coeternal, consubstantial divine persons: God the Father, God the Son (Jesus Christ) and God the Holy Spirit. Her husband, who died in 1881, "stated categorically that her visions did not support the Trinitarian creed". The "Ellen G. White Estate" has examined her later writings on the topic and found quotes they believe demonstrate she was a Trinitarian.

Arthur Patrick believes that White was an "evangelical", in that she had high regard for the Bible, saw the cross as central, supported righteousness by faith, believed in Christian activism, and sought to restore New Testament Christianity.

One study of Ellen White places both her and early Adventism within the context of the materialist theology of the times, seeing this to inform her Christology as well as other aspects of her teachings that are now outdated and do not correspond to contemporary Adventist views. By the same token, the study sees her as a precursor of monist covenantalism.

Regarding ethics and character, White once wrote:

"The greatest want of the world is the want of men—men who will not be bought or sold, men who in their inmost souls are true and honest, men who do not fear to call sin by its right name, men whose conscience is as true to duty as the needle to the pole, men who will stand for the right though the heavens fall."

== Music ==
She wrote that "Music, when not abused, is a great blessing; but when it is put to a wrong use, it is a terrible curse."

In her book Education, White writes about the use of music for the uplift of souls. She writes that music "is one of the most effective means of impressing the heart with spiritual truth. . . . As a part of religious service, singing is as much an act of worship as is prayer. Indeed, many a song is prayer. . . . Heaven's communion begins on earth. We learn here the keynote of its praise."

After a 1900 camp meeting with loud and sensational music and activities common in the Holy Roller form of Pentecostalism, she wrote the following: "The things you have described as taking place in Indiana, the Lord has shown me would take place Just before the close of probation. Every uncouth thing will be demonstrated. There will be shouting, with drums, music, and dancing. The senses of rational beings will become so confused that they cannot be trusted to make right decisions. And this is called the moving of the Holy Spirit." Her argument is that God's aspect of the Holy Spirit never uses such disarray. She continues that "no encouragement should be given to this kind of worship," as worshippers are excited by a power they wrongly assume to be God's.

She said, "Those things which have been in the past will be in the future. Satan will make music a snare by the way in which it is conducted. God calls upon His people, who have the light before them in the Word and in the Testimonies, to read and consider, and to take heed. Clear and definite instruction has been given in order that all may understand. But the itching desire to originate something new results in strange doctrines, and largely destroys the influence of those who would be a power for good if they held firm the beginning of their confidence in the truth the Lord had given them."

== End times ==
She described a "shaking" in the end times.

There are claims she predicted future events. Yet it is estimated that less than 5% of her writings contain predictions.

See the compilation of her end-time views by former White Estate director Robert W. Olson.

== Health ==
White expounded greatly on the subject of health and nutrition, as well as healthy eating, a balanced diet, and vegetarianism. At her behest, the Seventh-day Adventist Church first established the Western Health Reform Institute in Battle Creek, Michigan in 1866 to care for the sick as well as to disseminate health instruction. Over the years, other Adventist sanitariums were established around the country, and one was the Loma Linda Sanitarium, that is now name of the Loma Linda University Medical Center. These sanitariums became hospitals, forming the backbone of the Adventists' medical network and, in 1972, forming the Adventist Health System.

The beginnings of this health ministry are found in a vision that White had in 1863. The vision was said to have occurred during a visit by James and Ellen White to Otsego, Michigan to encourage the evangelistic workers there.

White wrote in 1864 that tobacco was "a slow, insidious, but most malignant poison." Later text spoke of a member of the church called Doctor Osborn who had not quit, saying that despite his use of tobacco, the judgment lodged against him was more offensive. She was also critical of the consumption of alcohol, saying: "Moderate drinking is the school in which men are educated for the drunkard’s career."

Early in 1866, responding to the instruction given to White on Christmas Day in 1865 that Seventh-day Adventists should establish a health institute for the care of the sick and the imparting of health instruction, plans were laid for the Western Health Reform Institute, which opened in September, 1866. While the Whites were in and out of Battle Creek from 1865 to 1868, James White's poor physical condition led them to move to a small farm near Greenville, Michigan.

White argued that "drugs do not cure disease" and that "in most cases, the drug only changes the form and location of the disease."

White's idea of health reform included vegetarianism in a day and age where "meat and two vegetables" was the standard meal for a typical North American. Her health message inspired a health food revolution starting with John Harvey Kellogg in his creation of Corn Flakes. He also is credited as the inventor of granola after she requested he make a product that was "very similar" to it. The Sanitarium Health Food Company as it is now known was also started by this health principle. Adhering to the principles outlined in the health reform, John Harvey Kellogg differed from his brother's views on the sugar content of their Corn Flake breakfast cereal. The latter started Kellogg Company. White championed a vegetarianism that was intended to be not only physically, but also spiritually helpful to humans, and also to treat God's creatures with love and respect. The vegetarian diet that she recommends for her followers is said to contribute to their higher than average longevity.

White prescribes that her followers drink six to eight glasses of water per day.

Her views are expressed in many of her writings such as Important Facts Of Faith: Laws Of Health, And Testimonies, Nos. 1–10 (1864), Healthful Living (1897, 1898), The Ministry of Healing (1905), The Health Food Ministry (1970), and Counsels on Diet and Foods (1938).

Her work for health reform and emphasis on a vegetarian lifestyle is seen as the cause of the city of Loma Linda being named by researcher Dan Buettner a Blue Zone where residents live for longer lives than the average lifespan. In 2022, journalist Avery Yale Kamila said that White's "profound and lasting influence on vegetarian food in the United States continues today."

== Education ==
Proper Education, 1872

Ellen White's earliest essays on Education appeared in the 1872 autumn editions of the Health Reformer. In her first essay, she stated that working with youthful minds was the most delicate of tasks. The manner of instruction should be varied. This would make it possible for the "high and noble powers of the mind" to have a chance to develop. To be qualified to educate the youth, parents and teachers must have self-control, gentleness and love.

Education has a Broad Scope

To White, Education is "more than merely having a knowledge of books. It takes in everything that is good, virtuous, righteous, and holy. It comprehends the practice of temperance, godliness, brotherly kindness, and love to God, and to each other. In order to attain this object, the physical, mental, moral, and religious education of children must have attention."

Teach Students How to Think, Act and Decide

She makes a distinction between simple training and education. The education of children should not be like the training of dumb animals. Children need to be shown how to use their own intelligent will to rule themselves. Children who are taught self-control will have moral energy and a sense of individual responsibility.

Once students are taught self-control, the teacher should show them how to strengthen their weaker faculties. In this way they will cultivate a balanced mind. They need to be taught how to think, act, and decide for themselves. They should be encouraged to develop their own judgment and to have an opinion of their own. This is done by giving them opportunity to exercise their own judgment, "as fast and as far as practicable."

Complete Control Causes Future Problems

"That class of teachers who are gratified that they have almost complete control of the will of their scholars are not the most successful teachers, although the appearance for the time being may be flattering. God never designed that one human mind should be under the complete control of another human mind." The most successful teachers over time are those who educate their students to use the power within to stand for principle. "Their work may not show to the very best advantage to careless observers, and their labors may not be valued as highly as the teacher who holds the will and mind of his scholars by absolute authority; but the future lives of the pupils will show the fruits of the better plan of education."

Ellen White's idea of creating a Christian educational system and its importance in society is detailed in her writings Christian Education (1893, 1894) and Education (1903).

== Church leadership ==
Ellen White wrote of Jesus as the believer's leader. According to White, Jesus was the leader of the Israelites in the Wilderness "enshrouded in the pillar of cloud."

She presented leadership concepts in connection with Biblical leaders: e.g. Moses, Joshua, Nehemiah

See also Ellen White on Leadership by Cindy Tutsch.

== See also ==
- Ellen G. White#Major teachings
- Inspiration of Ellen White, the debate concerning her inspiration
- List of Ellen White writings
- Ellen G. White Estate
- Ellen G. White bibliography
- Prophecy in the Seventh-day Adventist Church
- Three Angels' Messages
- The Pillars of Adventism
- Country Life Restaurants
