= Inspiration of Ellen G. White =

Seventh-day Adventist Church belief

Most Seventh-day Adventists believe church co-founder Ellen G. White (1827–1915) was inspired by God as a prophet, today understood as a manifestation of the New Testament "gift of prophecy," as described in the official beliefs of the church. Her works are officially considered to hold a secondary role to the Bible, but in practice there is wide variation among Adventists as to exactly how much authority should be attributed to her writings. With understanding she claimed was received in visions, White made administrative decisions and gave personal messages of encouragement or rebuke to church members. Seventh-day Adventists believe that only the Bible is sufficient for forming doctrines and beliefs, a position Ellen White supported by statements inclusive of, "the Bible, and the Bible alone, is our rule of faith".

== Views ==
Supportive views:

- Infallible, inerrant or verbal dictation. Some Historic Adventists in the church argue that she is inerrant. Various contemporaries of Ellen White argued for the even stronger view of verbal inspiration.
- Confirming doctrinal developments. The mainstream and most common Adventist view is that White's writings had a "confirming" not "initiating" role in the doctrinal development of the church, following the group's conclusions based on Bible study.

=== Official position ===
One of the 28 Fundamental Beliefs of the church is

"18. The Gift of Prophecy:
One of the gifts of the Holy Spirit is prophecy. This gift is an identifying mark of the remnant church and was manifested in the ministry of Ellen. G. White. As the Lord's messenger, her writings are a continuing and authoritative source of truth which provide for the church comfort, guidance, instruction, and correction. They also make clear that the Bible is the standard by which all teaching and experience must be tested. (Joel 2:28,29; Acts 2:14–21; Heb. 1:1–3; Rev. 12:17; 19:10.)"

Fundamental Belief number one, "Holy Scriptures," states in part,

"The Holy Scriptures are the infallible revelation of His will. They are… the authoritative reveler of doctrines…"

The Adventist baptismal vows do not mention Ellen White specifically yet the set of 13 vows include:

"8. I accept the biblical teaching of spiritual gifts and believe that the gift of prophecy is one of the identifying marks of the remnant church."

The General Conference in session made supportive statements in 2010, 2005 and 1995: "Her writings continue to be a most positive influence in the life of the Church, providing for it comfort, guidance, instruction, correction, and theological stimulus. Their study will constantly lead the Church back to the Bible as the very foundation of faith and practice."

An earlier, unofficial list of 22 foundational beliefs first printed in 1931 served as a de facto standard placed less emphasis on White.

"19. That God has placed in His church the gifts of the Holy Spirit, as enumerated in 1 Corinthians 12 and Ephesians 4. That these gifts operate in harmony with the divine principles of the Bible, and are given 'for the perfecting of the saints, for the work of the ministry, for the edifying of the body of Christ.' Eph. 4:12. That the gift of the Spirit of prophecy is one of the identifying marks of the remnant church. (1 Cor. 1:5–7; 1 Cor. 2:1–28 Rev. 12:17; Rev. 19:10; Amos 3:7; Hosea 12:10, 13.) They recognize that this gift was manifested in the life and ministry of Ellen G. White."

== Terminology ==
Adventists think of her inspiration as a manifestation of the spiritual gift of prophecy described in the New Testament. In particular, the 18th fundamental belief, titled "The Gift of Prophecy," mentions Ellen White's ministry.

White recounts one situation where she said before a large congregation that she "did not claim to be a prophetess." (emphasis in original) This statement generated much discussion and has been misunderstood since, to which she replied,

"Some have stumbled over the fact that I said I did not claim to be a prophet; and they have asked, Why is this? I have had no claims to make, only that I am instructed that I am the Lord's messenger... Early in my youth I was asked several times, Are you a prophet? I have ever responded, I am the Lord's messenger. I know that many have called me a prophet, but I have made no claim to this title."

"Why have I not claimed to be a prophet? — Because in these days many who boldly claim that they are prophets are a reproach to the cause of Christ; and because my work includes much more than the word 'prophet' signifies."

However she did not object to others calling her a prophet. Instead, she preferred the term "messenger" because her task involved many lines of work. This is also the term used in Fundamental Belief #18.

The term "pen of inspiration" has been used as a colloquial phrase for White's writings, although the church's news body recommends against it for public usage.

=== Spirit of prophecy ===
The term "spirit of prophecy" is sometimes used by many Adventists to refer to Ellen White, her ministry, and her writings. (Adventists also accept it refers to the Holy Spirit). An article by the White Estate gives the two definitions of (a) the Holy Spirit, or (b) the essence or heart of prophecy.

The term appears just once in scripture, in Revelation 19:10, "...for the testimony of Jesus is the spirit of prophecy." However Gerhard Pfandl argues it was well known to the readers of John's day, via Aramaic translations of the Old Testament ("targums"). He defines, "For the early Christians the "spirit of prophecy" was a reference to the Holy Spirit, who imparts the prophetic gift to God's messengers." Comparing Revelation 19:10 and 22:8,9, the parallel passages compare "your brethren who have the testimony of Jesus" with "your brethren the prophets".

Ellen White's enlargement of Spiritual Gifts was titled Spirit of Prophecy (four volumes), which in turn became the Conflict of the Ages series (five volumes) (see also: The Great Controversy). However the title was chosen by the editors, not by White herself.

The official statement "A Statement of Confidence in the Spirit of Prophecy" applies the term to White. Also the segment of Adventist World which reprints an Ellen White article is titled "Spirit of Prophecy".

See also "The Spirit of Prophecy" by James White and "Spirit of Prophecy" in the Seventh-day Adventist Encyclopedia.

== Sources and plagiarism charges ==
Ellen G. White's status as a modern-day prophet has often been criticized. A common criticism of Ellen White, widely popularized by Walter T. Rea, Ronald Numbers and others, is that she plagiarized material from other authors. A Roman Catholic lawyer, Vincent L. Ramik, undertook a study of Ellen G. White's writings during the early 1980s, and concluded that they were "conclusively unplagiaristic," although the report itself was called Memorandum of Law Literary Property Rights 1790–1915 and discussed "copyright infringement/piracy" according to the law of the land and time. When the plagiarism charge ignited a significant debate during the late 1970s and early 1980s, the Adventist General Conference commissioned a major study by Dr. Fred Veltman. The ensuing project became known as the "'Life of Christ' Research Project." Veltman examined fifteen, randomly selected chapters of The Desire of Ages for evidence of literary dependence and concluded, "On an average we may say that 31.4 percent of the DA text is dependent to some extent on literary sources." The results are available at the General Conference Archives. Dr. Roger W. Coon, David J. Conklin, Dr. Denis Fortin, King and Morgan, among others, undertook the refutation of the accusations of plagiarism. At the conclusion of Ramik's report, he states:

"It is impossible to imagine that the intention of Ellen G. White, as reflected in her writings and the unquestionably prodigious efforts involved therein, was anything other than a sincerely motivated and unselfish effort to place the understandings of Biblical truths in a coherent form for all to see and comprehend. Most certainly, the nature and content of her writings had but one hope and intent, namely, the furthering of mankind's understanding of the word of God. Considering all factors necessary in reaching a just conclusion on this issue, it is submitted that the writings of Ellen G. White were conclusively unplagiaristic."

Richard W. Schwarz from the Department of History, Andrews University, argued that any similarity with other sources may have occurred due to supernatural inspiration of those other authors, simply being another way to reveal that information.

Critics have especially targeted Ellen White's book The Great Controversy arguing in contains plagiarized material. However, in her introduction she wrote...

In some cases where a historian has so grouped together events as to afford, in brief, a comprehensive view of the subject, or has summarized details in a convenient manner, his words have been quoted; but in some instances no specific credit has been given, since the quotations are not given for the purpose of citing that writer as authority, but because his statement affords a ready and forcible presentation of the subject. In narrating the experience and views of those carrying forward the work of reform in our own time, similar use has been made of their published works.

— The Great Controversy, p. xi.4 1911 edition

Ramik cleared her of breaking the law of the land/time (copyright infringement/piracy), not of plagiarism in the academic sense. In 1911, more than 70 years before charges of plagiarism, White wrote in the introduction to The Great Controversy her reason for quoting, in some cases without giving due credit, certain historians whose "statements affords a ready and forcible presentation on the subject." Due to the discussions on plagiarism, "at least the educated mainstream church" ("church" meaning SDA church) no longer accepts the claim of White's "verbal inspiration". Robert Olson, secretary of the Ellen G. White Estate, speaking for all SDA Church, does not deny the "accumulating evidence" that she copied some of her information.

That Ellen White borrowed from other authors was openly acknowledged by herself (cf. GC xi-xii) and by people close to her (cf. 2SM 451-465).

— Denis Fortin & Jerry Moon, The Ellen G. White Encyclopedia

As interesting as this legal opinion and discussion of the propriety of White's literary dependence may be, the real issue for Adventists is how does her now generally-recognized practice affect the perception and reality of her authority.

== Miracles and tests ==
Supportive arguments which are used include claims of miraculous physical signs which were present, the accuracy of her health message, predictions, character of her life, and so on.

J. N. Loughborough, who had seen White in vision fifty times since 1852, and her husband, James White, listed several physical characteristics that marked the visions:

1. "In passing into vision, she gives three enrapturing shouts of "Glory!" which echo and re-echo, the second, and especially the third, fainter but more thrilling than the first, the voice resembling that of one quite a distance from you, and just going out of hearing."
2. For a few moments she would swoon, having no strength. Then she would be instantly filled with superhuman strength, sometimes rising to her feet and walking about the room. She frequently moved hands, arms, and head in gestures that were free and graceful. But to whatever position she moved a hand or arm, it could not be hindered nor controlled by even the strongest person. In 1845, the 80-pound White held her parents' 18.5-pound family Bible in her outstretched left hand for half an hour.
3. She did not breathe during the entire period of a vision that ranged from fifteen minutes to three hours. Yet, her pulse beat regularly and her countenance remained pleasant as in the natural state.
4. Her eyes were always open without blinking; her head was raised, looking upward with a pleasant expression as if staring intently at some distant object. Several physicians, at different times, conducted tests to check her lack of breathing and other physical phenomena.
5. She was utterly unconscious of everything transpiring around her, and viewed herself as removed from this world, and in the presence of heavenly beings.
6. When she came out of vision, all seemed total darkness whether in the day time or a well-lighted room at night. She would exclaim with a long-drawn sigh, as she took her first natural breath, "D-a-r-k." She was then limp and strengthless.

Mrs. Martha Amadon added: "There was never an excitement among those present during a vision; nothing caused fear. It was a solemn, quiet scene."

George I. Butler stated that when going into visions, "...there is no appearance of swooning or faintness," yet "...Often she loses her strength temporarily and reclines or sits; but at other time she stands up."

The White Estate wrote, "Such experiences should not be considered proof of divine inspiration, as prophets must meet the tests set forth in the Scriptures; but this experience, as well as other remarkable physical phenomena, were seen as evidence by many early Adventists that Ellen Harmon's visions were of supernatural origin."

White made no claims to work miracles. One claim was to White's prayers enacting healing.

== History of views ==
There has been much debate regarding the nature of her inspiration, both within and without the Adventist church. There have been many particularly significant developments since the 1970s when the discussion was particularly fierce. Throughout the history of the debate both more progressive/liberal and more conservative factions are clearly identifiable.

=== White's lifetime ===
Ellen White's support from the early Sabbatarian Adventists grew over time, although there were major detractors also. Even during Ellen White's lifetime Adventists had different views regarding the nature of her prophetic ministry. She corrected both people who downplayed her writings, and those who elevated them too highly. She rebuked both those who downplayed or rejected her writings, such as A. T. Jones and also those who elevated her writings too high, such as Dr. D. Paulson (see above) During her life she constantly fought for her followers to focus on Scripture, and not to use her writings as the arbiter of truth.

One opponent to White during her lifetime was the "Marion Party" in the 1860s, led by B. F. Snook and W. H. Brinkerhoff, which split from the church in 1866. In the same year, they published the first book critical of White's prophetic ministry – The Visions of E. G. White, Not of God. (Together with others, they constituted the forerunners of the Church of God (Seventh Day)). Uriah Smith replied with The Visions of Mrs. E. G. White: A Manifestation of Spiritual Gifts According to the Scriptures (1868), "thus beginning the vast repertoire of apologetic literature defending the ministry of Ellen White," according to one historian.

Her first vision was in December 1844. She also experienced powerful dreams, including two earlier in 1842.

J. N. Loughborough's early history Rise and Progress of the Seventh-day Adventists (DjVu format) is one of the early Adventist historical books documenting the rise of the movement.

=== Tension between fundamentalism and liberalism ===
F. C. Gilbert edited Divine Predictions of Mrs. Ellen G. White Fulfilled in 1922.

In 1926 the General Conference published a college textbook that argued for so-called verbal inspiration, while rejecting verbal dictation and Ellen White's several statements of thought inspiration. Daniells, Prescott and Willie White were sidelined. The loss of the moderate position has caused problems for the church that continue to the present day. Prescott expressed some serious concerns in a letter to Willie in 1915. H. M. S. Richards saw her as fallible, and when accusations such as plagiarism arose decades later, he reported that he was not disturbed because he had heard them all before at the 1919 Conference.

Willie White addressed faculty and students about "How Ellen White's Books Were Written" in 1935.

The 1919 Bible Conference was a significant theological milestone, arguably the first scholarly conference in Adventist history (its attendees were the best-trained group of leaders and educators up to that time), but the significance of the discussions about Ellen White were not recognized until the rediscovery of the conference transcripts in 1973. Led by A. G. Daniells, the discussion occurred within the context of issues related to prophetic interpretation, and how to relate to change after her death. What has become known historically as the Fundamentalist movement had an influence on the 1919 Bible Conference as it was reaching its heyday during the 1920s. Many members held fundamentalist views and at conference it served to polarize Adventist theology into what some call "liberal" and "conservative" camps that continue to impact the church today. Today's views were evident at the 1919 Conference and remain today.

Detailed study of Adventism by doctoral candidates has been occurring since at least Everett N. Dick's 1930 dissertation.

Other books published during this period include The Abiding Gift of Prophecy by A. G. Daniells (1936) and Believe His Prophets by Denton E. Rebok (1956). In 1951 Francis D. Nichol published the classic apologetic work Ellen G. White and Her Critics. According to the White Estate, this book

"…after 50 years is still the most comprehensive response to various charges against Ellen G. White. Though on a few points it may not reflect the current state of our knowledge, its reasoning is incisive and its perspectives helpful."

In 1955 Thomas Jemison published A Prophet Among You, which became a standard college textbook for decades.

Conservative scholar Samuel Koranteng-Pipim, and Historic Adventists Colin and Russell Standish, produced self-published works around 1991.

The first quarter 2009 Adult Bible Study Guide covers the gift of prophecy, particularly as it relates to Ellen White.

==== Film ====
Several media productions have made an impact since the late 90s.

Allen Lindsay hosted the documentary series Keepers of the Flame (2005), of which the last half primarily concerns White.

The video Prophetic Inspiration: The Holy Spirit at Work (2006) was produced by Avondale College theology lecturers.

In 2010 PBS produced The Adventists documentary, that focused on Adventists living longer and seemingly healthier lives and their history.

== See also ==
- Prophecy in the Seventh-day Adventist Church
- Ellen G. White: teachings, writings, James White, Willie White, White Estate
- Biblical inspiration, Revelation, Prophet and Prophecy
- Adventist studies
- Category:Books by Ellen G. White – for detailed information on the production of her books
- Seventh-day Adventist Church
- Seventh-day Adventist theology
- The Pillars of Adventism
- Teachings of Ellen White#End times
- List of Ellen White writings
- Ellen G. White Estate
- Seventh-day Adventist interfaith relations – for relations with other Protestants and Catholics
- Second coming
- Premillennialism
- Investigative judgment
