= Ellen G. White =

American author and co-founder of the Seventh-day Adventist Church (1827–1915)

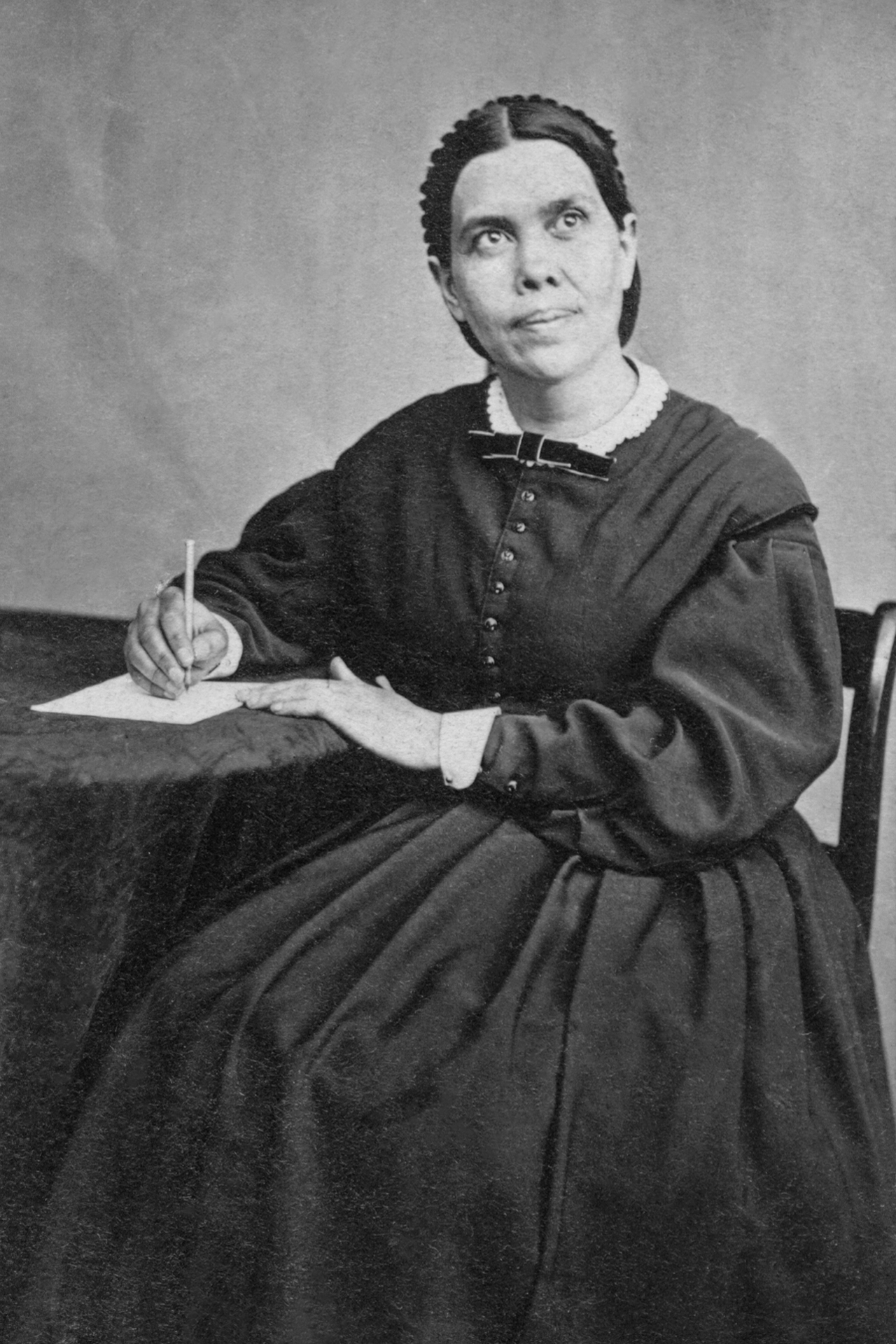
- White in 1864

Personal details
- Born: Ellen Gould Harmon; November 26, 1827 Gorham, Maine, U.S.
- Died: July 16, 1915 (aged 87) Elmshaven, St. Helena, California, U.S.
- Spouse: James S. White (m. 1846; died 1881)
- Children: 4, including James Edson White and William C. White
- Occupation: Author and co-founder of the Seventh-day Adventist Church
- Signature: Ellen G. White's signature

Ellen Gould White (née Harmon; November 26, 1827 – July 16, 1915) was an American author, and was both the prophet and a co-founder of the Seventh-day Adventist Church. Along with other Adventist leaders, such as Joseph Bates and her husband James White, she was influential within a small group of early Adventists who formed what became known as the Seventh-day Adventist Church. White is considered a leading figure in American vegetarian history. Smithsonian named her among the "100 Most Significant Americans of All Time".

White's biographer and grandson, Arthur L. White, estimated that she reported receiving over 2,000 visions and dreams from God. She verbally described and published for public consumption her accounts of many of these experiences. The Adventist pioneers believed them to be examples of the Biblical gift of prophecy. Her Conflict of the Ages series of writings describes her understanding of the role of God in Biblical history and in church history. This narrative of cosmic conflict, referred to by Seventh-day Adventist theologians as the "Great Controversy theme", became foundational to the development of Seventh-day Adventist theology. Her book on Christian living, Steps to Christ, has been published in more than 140 languages. The book Child Guidance—a compilation of her writings about child care and education—has been used as the foundation for the Seventh-day Adventist school system.

White was a controversial figure, and much of the controversy centered on her reports of visionary experiences and on the use of other sources in her writings. Historian Randall Balmer has described White as "one of the more important and colorful figures in the history of American religion". Walter Martin described her as "one of the most fascinating and controversial personages ever to appear upon the horizon of religious history". Arthur L. White, her grandson and biographer, wrote that Ellen G. White is the most translated female non-fiction author in the history of literature, as well as the most translated American non-fiction author overall. Her writings covered a broad range of subjects, including religion, social relationships, prophecy, publishing, nutrition, creationism, agriculture, theology, evangelism, Christian lifestyle, education, and health. During her lifetime she wrote more than 5,000 periodical articles and 40 books. As of 2019 more than 200 White titles are available in English, including compilations from her 100,000 pages of manuscript maintained by the Ellen G. White Estate. Her most notable books are Steps to Christ, The Desire of Ages, and The Great Controversy.

== Personal life ==
=== Early life ===
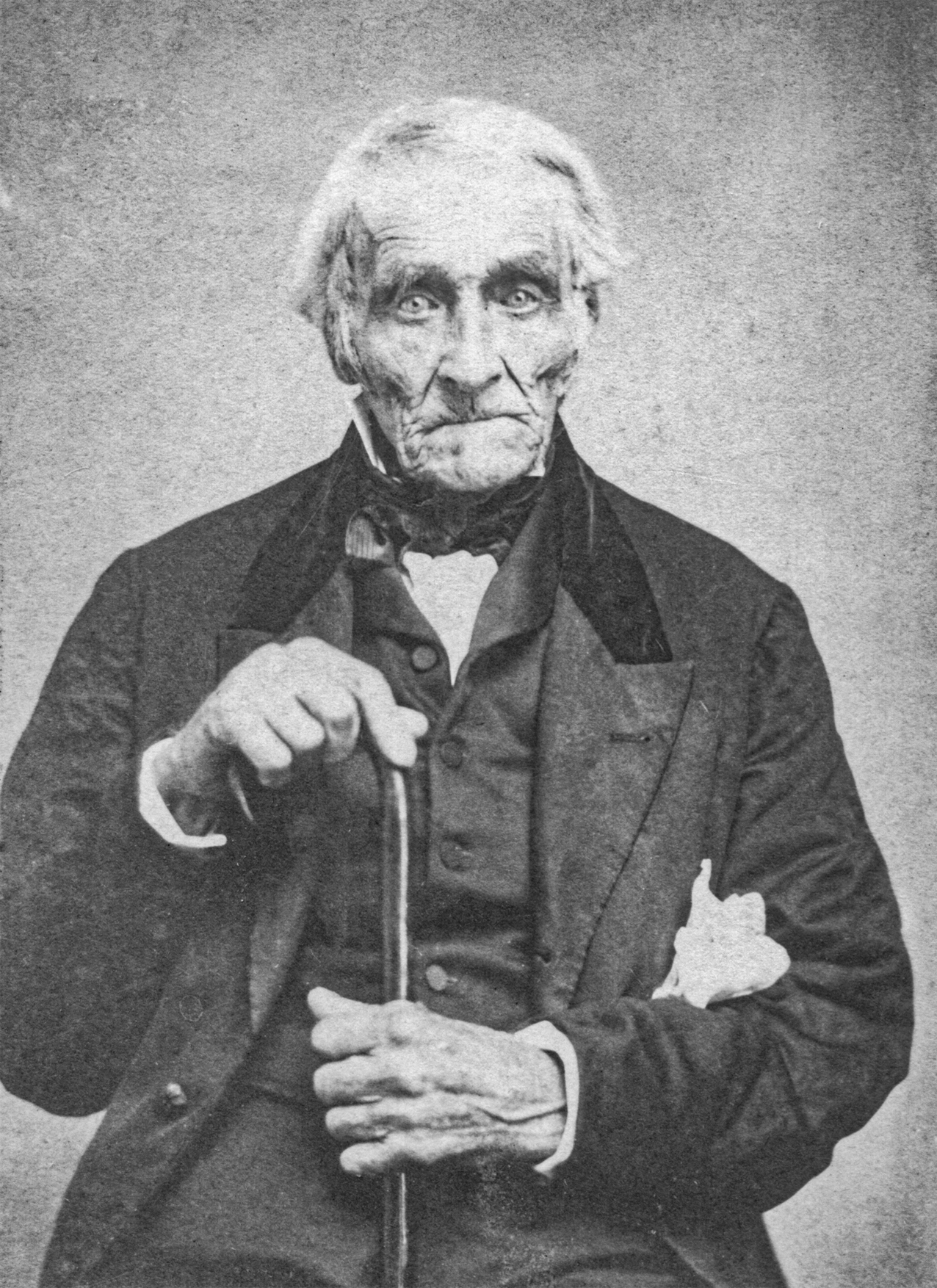
Robert Harmon (1784–1866), father of Ellen G. White.

Ellen and her twin sister Elizabeth were born November 26, 1827, to Robert and Eunice Harmon at a home at State Route 114 in Gorham, Maine. She was the seventh of eight children. Robert was a farmer who also made hats using mercuric nitrate.

In March 2000, the Ellen G. White Estate commissioned Roger D. Joslyn, a professional genealogist, to research Ellen G. White's ancestry. Joslyn concluded that she was of Anglo-Saxon origin.

At the age of nine, White was hit in the face with a stone. This occurred while she was living in Portland, Maine, and attending the Brackett Street School. This, she said, started her conversion: "This misfortune, which for a time seemed so bitter and was so hard to bear, has proved to be a blessing in disguise. The cruel blow which blighted the joys of earth, was the means of turning my eyes to heaven. I might never have known Jesus, had not the sorrow that clouded my early years led me to seek comfort in him". A few years after her injury, Ellen, with her parents, attended a Methodist camp meeting at Buxton, Maine; and there, at the age of 12, a breakthrough occurred in which she had a conversion experience and felt at peace.

=== Millerite movement ===
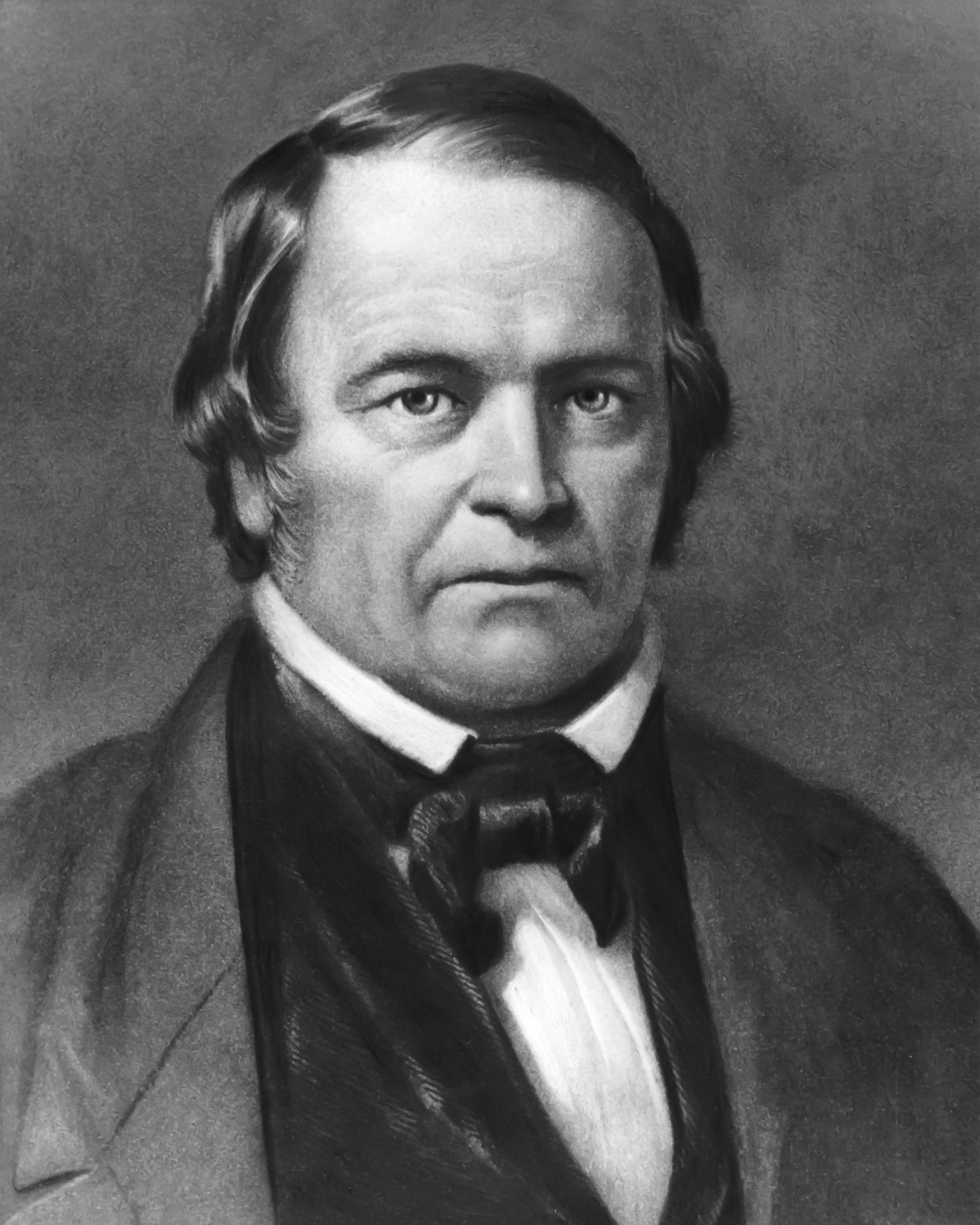
William Miller, American Baptist preacher (1782–1849).

In 1840, at age 12, her family became involved with the Millerite movement. As she attended William Miller's lectures, she felt guilty for her sins and was filled with terror about being eternally lost. She describes herself as spending nights in tears and prayer and being in this condition for several months. On June 26, 1842, she was baptized by John Hobart in Casco Bay in Portland, Maine, and eagerly awaited Jesus to come again. In her later years, she referred to this as the happiest time of her life. Her family's involvement with Millerism caused them to be disfellowshipped by the local Methodist church.

=== Marriage and family ===
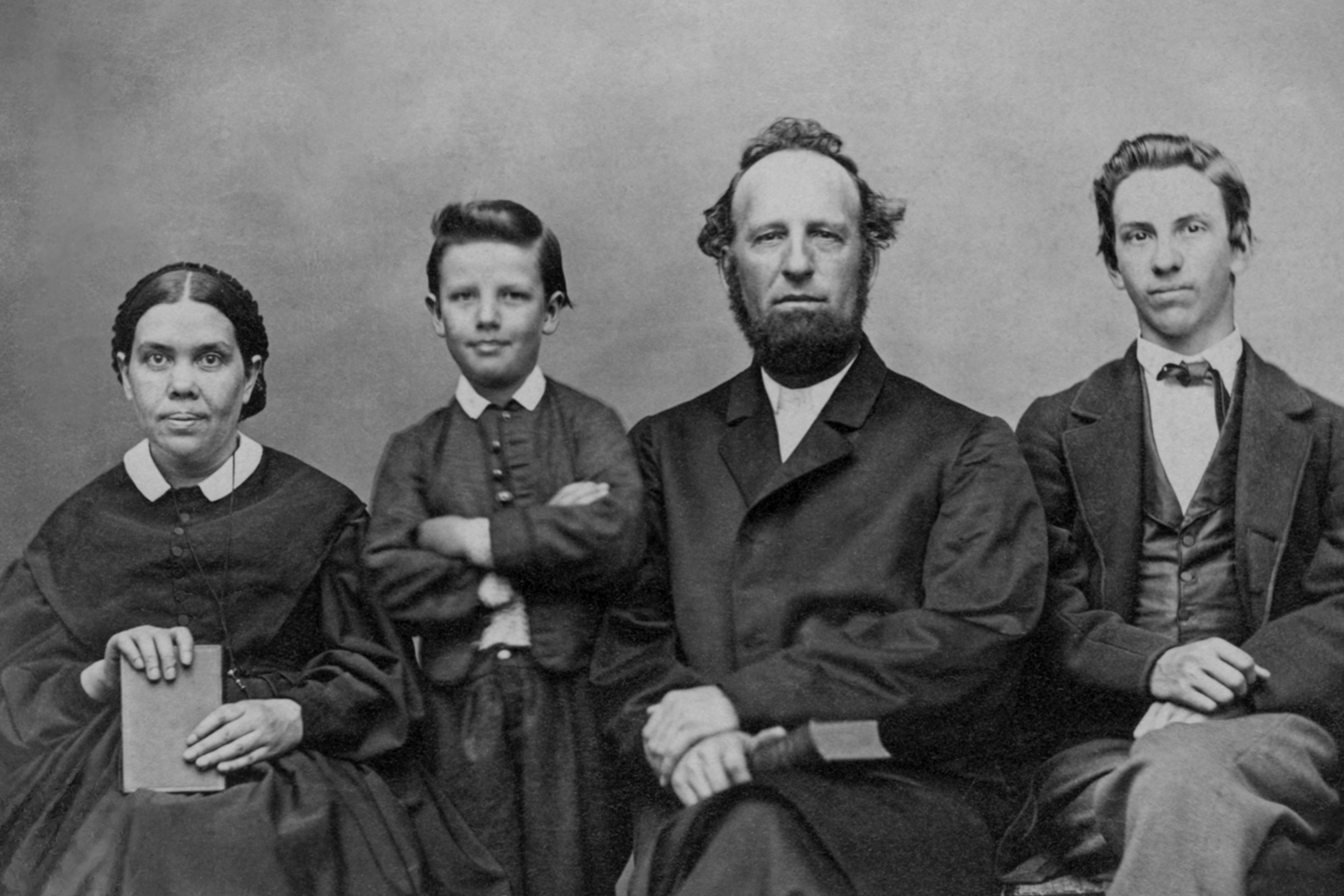
Ellen G. White family in 1865.

In February 1845, Ellen Harmon came in contact with her future husband James Springer White, a Millerite who became convinced that her visions were genuine. During the winter of 1845, the two, accompanied by a female chaperone, visited Millerite believers in Maine, including an eventful stop in Atkinson for a farmhouse meeting led by Israel Dammon. A year later James proposed and they were married by a justice of the peace in Portland, Maine, on August 30, 1846. James later wrote:

We were married August 30, 1846, and from that hour to the present she has been my crown of rejoicing ... It has been in the good providence of God that both of us had enjoyed a deep experience in the Advent movement ... This experience was now needed as we should join our forces and, united, labor extensively from the Atlantic Ocean to the Pacific ...

The Whites had four sons: Henry Nichols, James Edson (known as Edson), William Clarence (known as Willie or W. C.), and John Herbert. Only Edson and William lived to adulthood. John Herbert died of erysipelas at the age of two months, and Henry died of pneumonia at the age of 16 [White Estate Biography] in 1863.

=== Final years and death ===
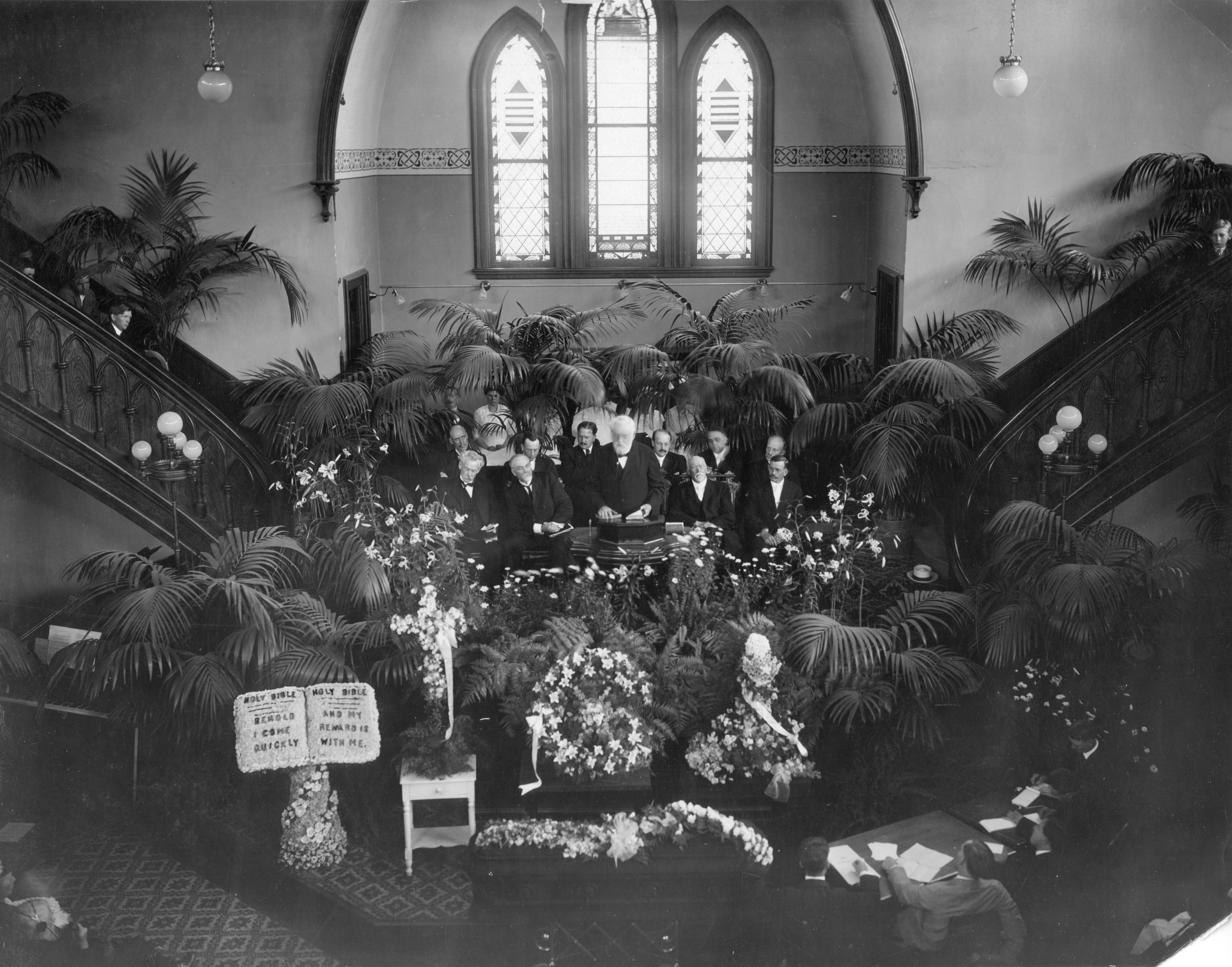
Funeral service for Ellen G. White at Battle Creek Tabernacle before her interment in the Oak Hill Cemetery.

In 1877 the Whites bought a ranch near Healdsburg, California, where James White died in 1881. The following year Ellen White bought a house in Healdsburg, which remained her West Coast home until she left for Australia in 1891; also in 1882, Adventists opened Healdsburg Academy in the town, the forerunner of Pacific Union College. After returning to California in 1900, she spent the final years of her life at Elmshaven, her home in Saint Helena, California. During her final years she traveled less frequently as she concentrated upon writing her last works for the church. She died on July 16, 1915, at her home in Elmshaven, which is now an Adventist Historical Site. After three funerals, she was buried alongside her husband James White in Oak Hill Cemetery, Battle Creek, Michigan.

== Ministry ==
=== Visions ===
From 1844 to 1863 White allegedly experienced between 100 and 200 visions, typically in public places and meeting halls. She experienced her first vision soon after the Millerite Great Disappointment of 1844. She said she had one that led to the writing of The Great Controversy at an Ohio funeral service held on a Sunday afternoon in March 1858, in the Lovett's Grove (now Bowling Green, Ohio) public school. This was an alleged vision of the ages-long conflict between Christ and his angels and Satan and his angels.

In December 1844, White experienced her first vision during a prayer meeting at the home of Mrs. Elizabeth Haines in Portland, Maine, on the end of Danforth Street just before Vaughan's bridge, which crossed the Fore River. The site became an industrial area by the end of the 1800s. Ellen White described the occasion:

At this time I visited one of our Advent sisters, and in the morning we bowed around the family altar. It was not an exciting occasion, and there were but five of us present, all females. While praying, the power of God came upon me as I never had felt it before, and I was wrapt up in a vision of God's glory, and seemed to be rising higher and higher from the earth and was shown something of the travels of the Advent people to the Holy City ...

In this vision the "Advent people" were traveling a high and dangerous path towards the city of New Jerusalem [heaven]. Their path was lit from the path's beginning by a bright light "which an angel told me was the midnight cry." Some of the travelers grew weary and were encouraged by Jesus; others denied the light, the light behind them went out, and they fell "off the path into the dark and wicked world below." The vision continued with a portrayal of Christ's second coming, following which the Advent people entered the New Jerusalem. As Godfrey T. Anderson said, "In effect, the vision assured the Advent believers of eventual triumph despite the immediate despair into which they had plunged."

In February 1845, White allegedly experienced her fifth vision in Exeter, Maine. It was known as the "Bridegroom" vision. Together with the sixteenth vision, the "New Earth" vision, the visions "gave continued meaning to the October 1844 experience and supported the developing sanctuary rationale. Additionally they played an important role in countering the spiritualizing views of many fanatical Adventists by portraying the Father and Jesus as literal beings and heaven as a physical place."

On June 6, 1863, in Otsego, Michigan she experienced a vision regarding vegetarianism as beneficial to health. The message, however, because of her extensive travels during the 19th century and the lack of vegetarian food, in her view was not absolute. She committed herself to vegetarianism in January 1894 when she was at the Brighton camp meeting near Melbourne, Australia.

==== Public testimony ====
Fearing people would not accept her testimony, White did not initially share her visions with the wider Millerite community. In a meeting at her parents' home she received in her third vision what she regarded as confirmation of her ministry:

While praying, the thick darkness that had enveloped me was scattered, a bright light, like a ball of fire, came towards me, and as it fell upon me, my strength was taken away. I seemed to be in the presence of Jesus and the angels. Again it was repeated, 'Make known to others what I have revealed to you.'

Before the Disappointment and before her first vision, White had given her testimony in public meetings and in her regular Methodist class meetings in private homes.

I arranged meetings with my young friends, some of whom were considerably older than myself, and a few were married persons. A number of them were vain and thoughtless; my experience sounded to them like an idle tale, and they did not heed my entreaties. But I determined that my efforts should never cease till these dear souls, for whom I had so great an interest, yielded to God. Several entire nights were spent by me in earnest prayer for those whom I had sought out and brought together for the purpose of laboring and praying with them.

News of her visions spread and White was soon traveling and speaking to groups of Millerite followers in Maine and the surrounding area. Her visions were not publicized further afield until January 24, 1846, when her account of the first vision: "Letter From Sister Harmon" was published in The Day-Star, a Millerite paper published in Cincinnati, Ohio, by Enoch Jacobs. White had written to Jacobs to encourage him and, although she stated the letter was not written for publication, Jacobs printed it anyway. Through the next few years it was republished in various forms and is included as part of her first book, A Sketch of the Christian Experience and Views of Ellen G. White, published in 1851.

Two Millerites claimed to have had visions prior to White – William Ellis Foy, and Hazen Foss, the brother of White's brother-in-law. Adventists believe the prophetic gift offered to these two men was passed on to White when they rejected it.

=== Middle life ===
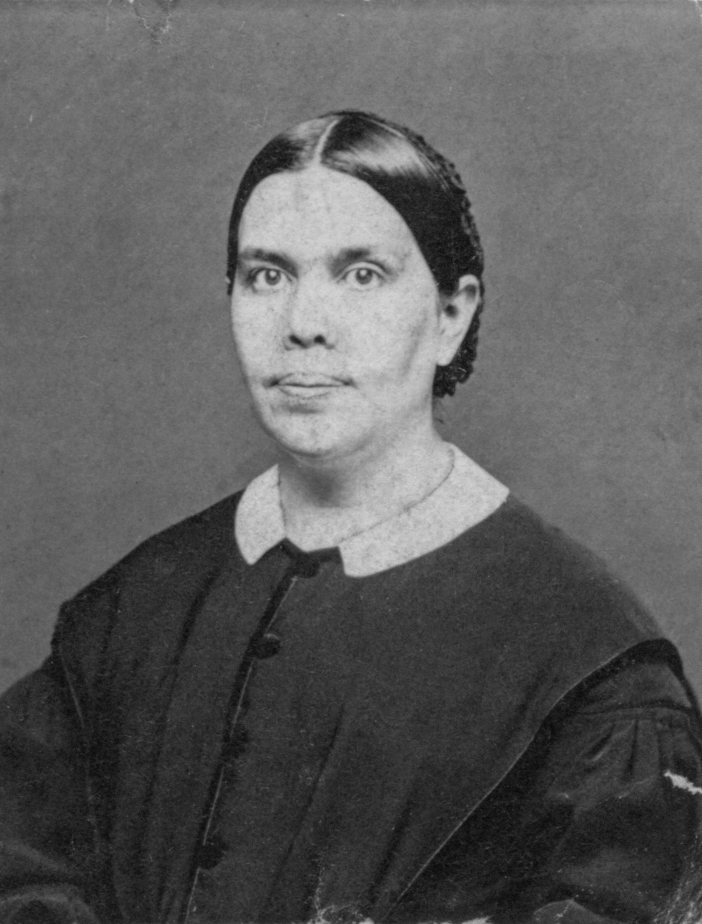
Portrait of Ellen G. White at age 32

White described the vision experience as involving a bright light which would surround her, and she felt herself in the presence of Jesus or angels who would show her events (historical and future) and places (on earth, in heaven, or other planets). The transcriptions of White's visions generally contain theology, prophecy, or personal counsels to individuals or to Adventist leaders. One of the best examples of her personal counsels is found in a 9-volume series of books entitled Testimonies for the Church, which contain edited testimonies published for the general edification of the church. The spoken and written versions of her visions played a significant part in establishing and shaping the organizational structure of the emerging Seventh-day Adventist Church. Her visions and writings continue to be used by church leaders in developing the church's policies and for devotional reading.

On March 14, 1858, at Lovett's Grove, near Bowling Green, Ohio, White received a vision while attending a funeral service. Regarding that day, James White wrote that "God manifested His power in a wonderful manner," adding that "several had decided to keep the Lord's Sabbath and go with the people of God." In writing about the vision, Ellen herself stated that she received practical instruction for church members, and more significantly, a cosmic sweep of the conflict "between Christ and His angels, and Satan and his angels." Ellen White would expand upon this great controversy theme, which would eventually culminate in the Conflict of the Ages series.

== Personality and public persona ==
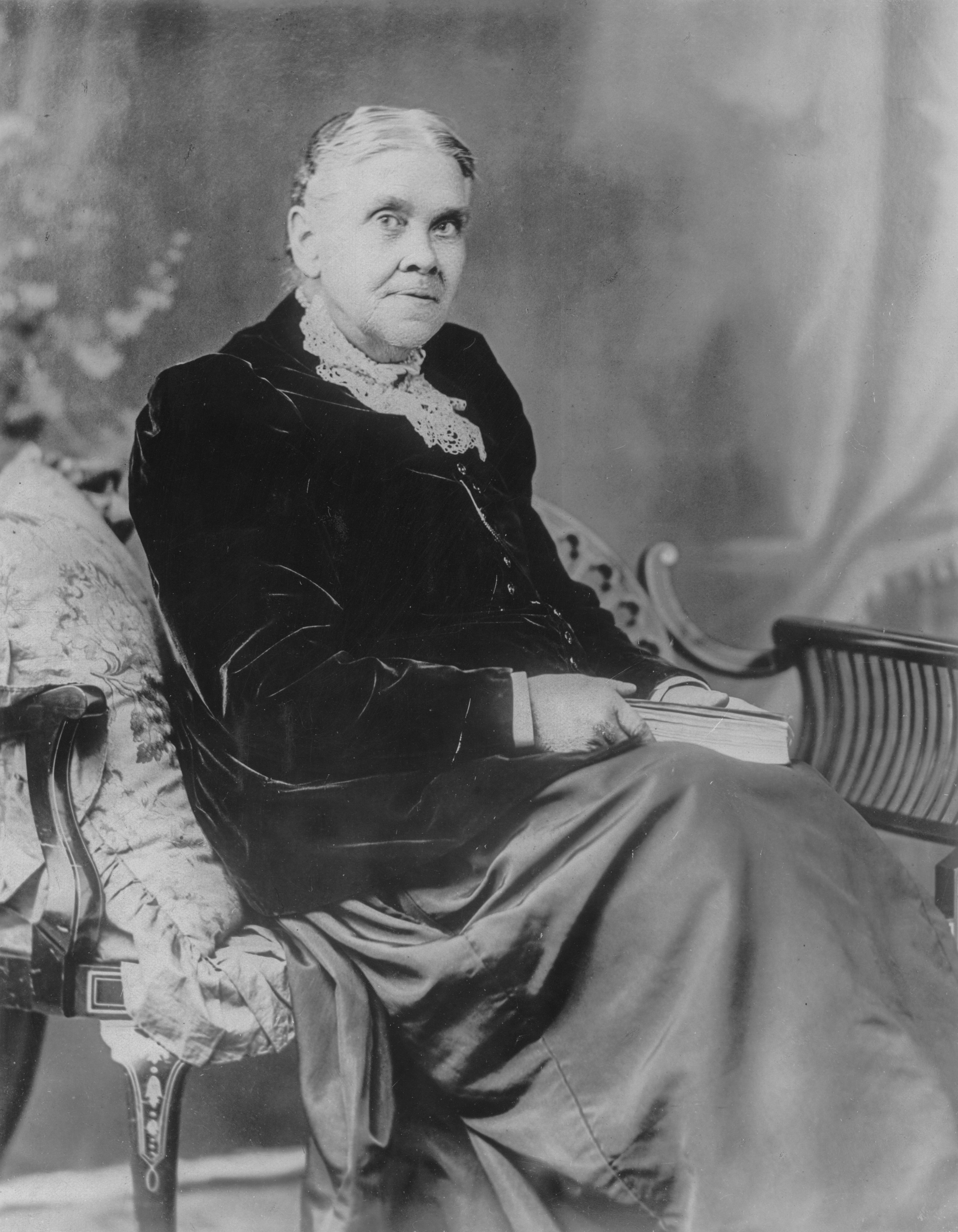
Ellen G. White in Australia at age 72

White was seen as a powerful and sought-after preacher. While she has been perceived as having a strict and serious personality, perhaps due to her lifestyle standards, numerous sources describe her as a friendly person.

== Major teachings ==
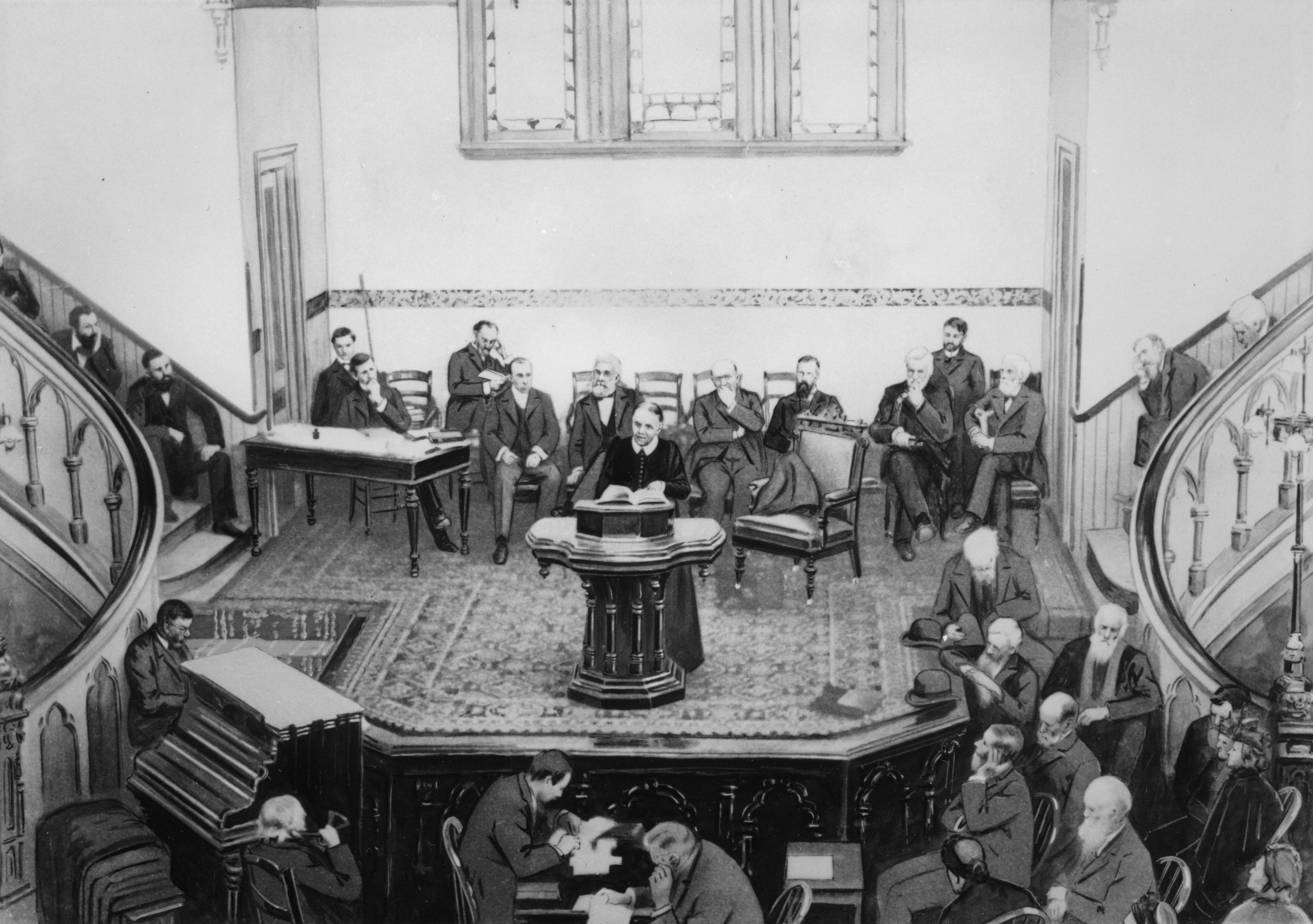
Ellen G. White speaking at the 1901 General Conference Session of Seventh-day Adventists.

=== Theology ===
- Christ-centered salvation by grace
- The Great Controversy theme
- Obedience to revealed truth a sign of genuine faith

Jerry Moon argues that White taught assurance of salvation. Arthur Patrick believes that White was evangelical, in that she had high regard for the Bible, saw the cross as central, supported righteousness by faith, believed in Christian activism, and sought to restore New Testament Christianity.

Malcolm Bull writes that Ellen White avoided using the word "Trinity", "and her husband stated categorically that her visions did not support the Trinitarian creed." Bull wrote that "one researcher was forced to conclude" that there has not "been found any Trinitarian declaration written, prior to [1898], by an Adventist writer other than Ellen G. White." Her theology did not include a doctrine of the Trinity (generally speaking, she lacked doctrine, since she was a preacher/orator rather than an academic theologian). Malcolm Bull postulates that she believed Jesus did not begin as equal to God the Father but was at a certain moment promoted to equality with the Father, which triggered Lucifer's rebellion (as explained in her book Spirit of Prophecy). Erwin R. Gane cites other writings that contradict this view. Referring to the ceremony, she wrote: "There had been no change in the position or authority of Christ."

According to Jerry Moon in The Adventist Trinity Debate, although her earlier visions and writings do not clearly reveal the Three Persons of the Godhead, her later works strongly bring out the teaching of "the Third Person of the Godhead".

Some scholars have denied that Ellen White was a major influence in the Adventist shift toward Trinitarian doctrine and have argued that early Adventism had neither an Arian, Semi-Arian, nor Trinitarian theology, but rather a materialist one.

Her husband was definitely antitrinitarian, but her own writings facilitated the adoption of Trinitarianism by the SDA Church. According to two Adventist professors, while she never used the word "Trinity", she affirmed the Trinity as "the heavenly trio". Another Adventist professor agrees she affirmed the Trinity.

The SDA Church was originally Binitarian rather than Trinitarian.

=== Education ===
White's earliest essays on education appeared in the 1872 autumn editions of the Health Reformer. In her first essay she stated that working with youthful minds was the most delicate of tasks. The manner of instruction should be varied. This would make it possible for the "high and noble powers of the mind" to have a chance to develop. To be qualified to educate the youth (she wrote), parents and teachers must have self-control, gentleness and love.

White's idea of creating a Christian educational system and its importance in society are detailed in her writings Christian Education (1893, 1894) and Education (1903).

=== Health reform ===
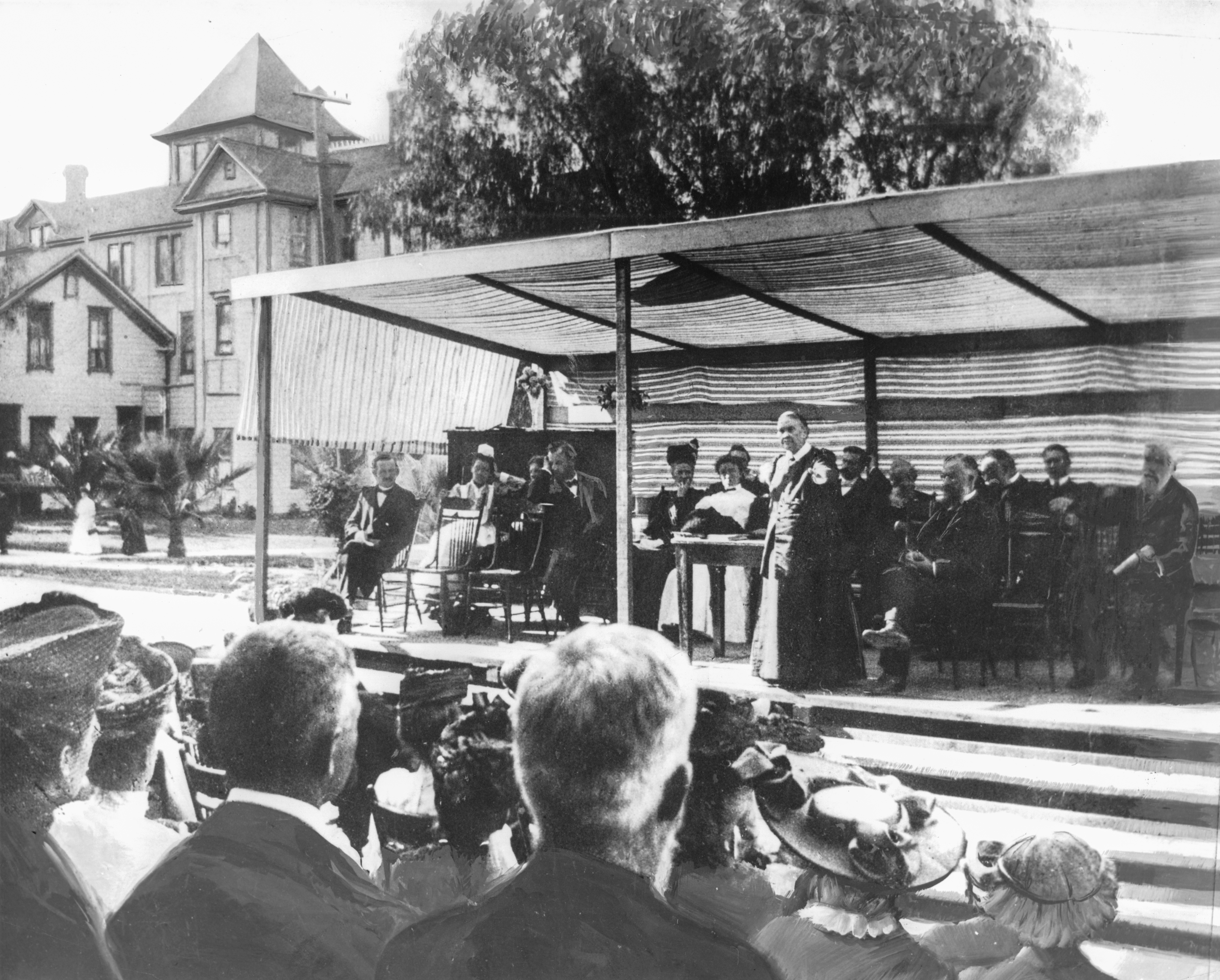
Ellen G. White at the Loma Linda Sanitarium dedication in 1906.

White expounded greatly on the subjects of health, healthy eating and a vegetarian diet. In her book Counsels on Diet and Foods, she gives advice on the right foods and on moderation. She also warns against the use of tobacco, which was medically accepted in her day. Her views are expressed in the writings Healthful Living (1897, 1898), The Ministry of Healing (1905), and The Health Food Ministry (1970). White wrote in The Ministry of Healing: "Grains, fruits, nuts, and vegetables constitute the diet chosen for us by our Creator." White was against eating meat, eating spicy food, drinking alcohol, and smoking. She also opposed masturbation, medication, and physicians. The Ellen G. White Encyclopedia recognizes that her assertions about masturbation are contrary to 21st century scientific opinion. That is also supported by other Adventist publications.

She is the founder of many health sanitariums, the most famous of which are the Battle Creek Sanitarium and the Loma Linda Sanitarium, which is now named the Loma Linda University Medical Center. She hired American physician, inventor, and businessman John Harvey Kellogg. Her work for health reform and emphasis on healthy lifestyle is seen as the cause of the city of Loma Linda being named by researcher Dan Buettner a Blue Zone where residents live for longer lives than the average lifespan. The health reform message that she delivered is promoted by the church as a means to glorify God, though the church does not make vegetarianism a requirement for salvation. The largest proportion of Seventh-day Adventist vegetarians is in North America where over half of the members are vegetarian or vegan.

Her health reform writing focused on human health but her statements also included compassion towards animals, which was unusual for her time.

== Major writings ==
White's books include:

- Patriarchs and Prophets (1890), describing Biblical history from the Creation to Israel's King David.
- Prophets and Kings (1917), describing Biblical history from King Solomon until Israel returned from exile.
- The Desire of Ages (1898), a comprehensive volume on the life of Jesus of Nazareth.
- The Acts of the Apostles (1911), detailing the rise of the early Christian church in the first century.
- The Great Controversy (1888, 1911), describing the history of sin from beginning to end, a condensed account of the history of the church until the end of time.
- Steps to Christ (1892), a classic, concise (evangelical) treatment of personal devotional topics.
- Christ's Object Lessons (1900), about the parables of Jesus.
- Education (1903), principles of Christian education.
- The Ministry of Healing (1905), instructions on healthy living and the care of others.
- Thoughts from the Mount of Blessing (1896), an exposition on Jesus' Sermon on the Mount.
- 1888 Materials, V.1 - V.4, (1987);

A survey conducted in 2016 found that White was the 11th most-read author in Brazil.

== Historic legacy ==
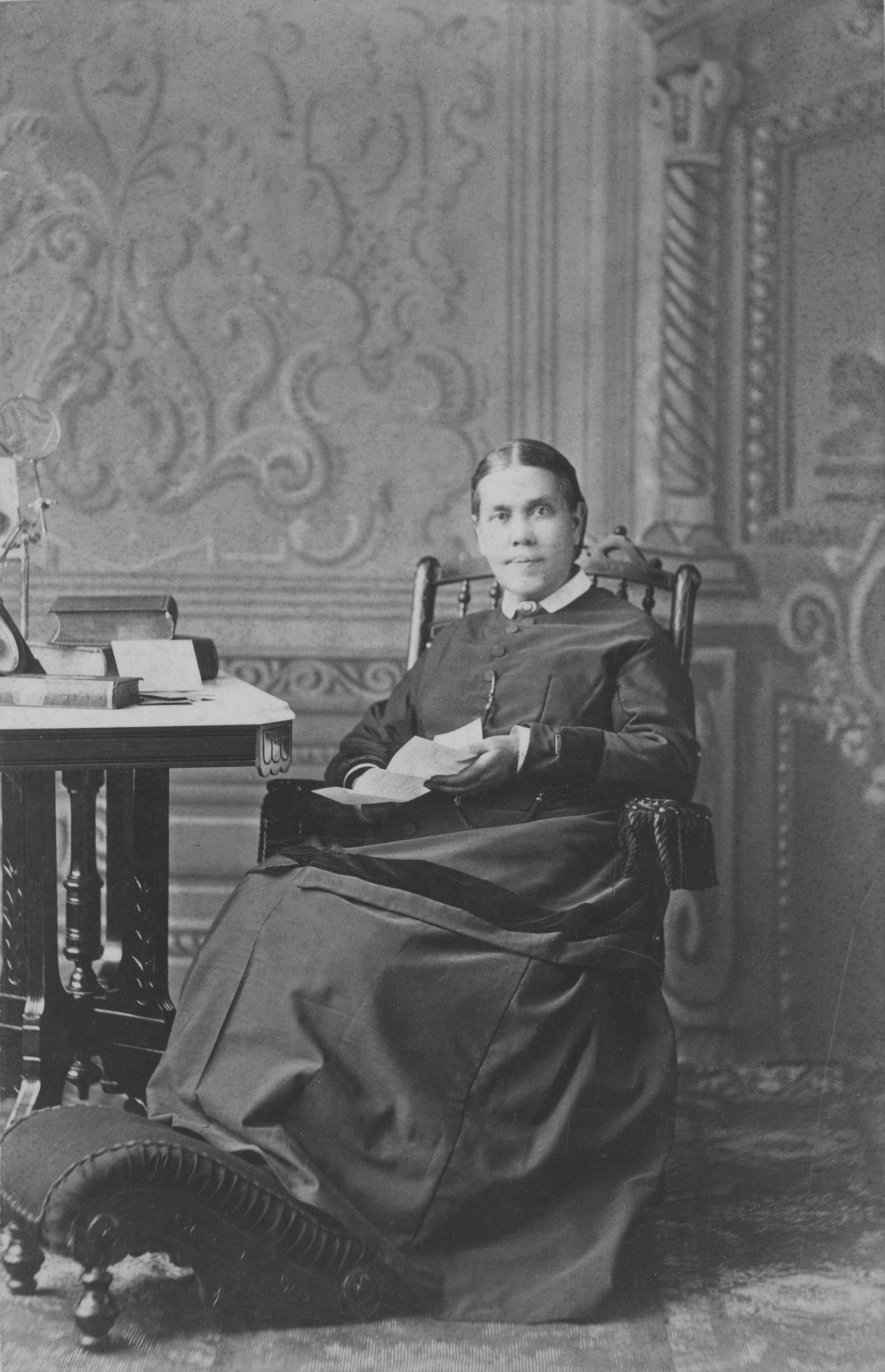
Ellen G. White at age 51. This was one of Ellen White's favorite portraits. She used it often when exchanging pictures with friends and relatives.

According to one evangelical author, "No Christian leader or theologian has exerted as great an influence on a particular denomination as Ellen White has on Adventism." Additional authors have stated "Ellen G. White has undoubtedly been the most influential Seventh-day Adventist in the history of the church." She is frequently mentioned in non-Adventist media, with one example being Parade magazine in 2022 listing a quote from White among its list of the 100 best love quotes.

=== Ellen G. White Estate ===
The Ellen G. White Estate, Inc., was formed as a result of White's will. It consists of a self-perpetuating board and a staff which includes a secretary (now known as the director), several associates, and a support staff. The main headquarters is at the Seventh-day Adventist General Conference headquarters in Silver Spring, Maryland. Branch Offices are located at Andrews University, Loma Linda University, and Oakwood University. There are 15 additional research centers located throughout the 13 remaining divisions of the world church. The mission of the White Estate is to circulate Ellen White's writings, translate them, and provide resources for helping to better understand her life and ministry. At the Toronto General Conference Session (2000) the world church expanded the mission of the White Estate to include a responsibility for promoting Adventist history for the entire denomination.

=== Adventist historic sites ===
Several of White's homes are historic sites. The first home that she and her husband owned is now part of the Historic Adventist Village in Battle Creek, Michigan. Her other homes are privately owned with the exception of her home in Cooranbong, Australia, which she named "Sunnyside", and her last home in Saint Helena, California, which she named "Elmshaven". These latter two homes are owned by the Seventh-day Adventist Church. The "Elmshaven" home is a National Historic Landmark.

=== Avondale College ===
White inspired and guided the foundation of Avondale College (now Avondale University), Cooranbong, leaving an educational legacy from her time in Australia. Avondale University is the main Seventh-day Adventist tertiary institution in the South-Pacific Division. In 2021, the restored White house of Sunnyside was reopened to the public. The home has architectural elements of New England adapted for Australia.

=== Other sites ===
In Florence, Italy, a street is named after White. The via Ellen Gould White leads to the Adventist Institute "Villa Aurora" at the Viale del Pergolino.

=== Vegetarian food ===
White had a major influence on the development of vegetarian foods and vegetarian food product companies. In the U.S., these included granola, Kellogg's corn flakes, Post cereals, Soyalac soymilk, Worthington Foods, La Loma Foods, and Morningstar Farms. In 2022, the New York Conference of Seventh-day Adventists listed 33 Adventist-affiliated vegetarian restaurants, most that were located inside the United States of America including six in Texas. In Kingston, Jamaica, the three Maranatha health food stores and one restaurant are based on the health teachings of White.

In 2021, an opinion column in Australian beef industry publication Beef Central was critical of the influence of the Seventh-day Adventist church in shaping national food policy traced to White and the 1897 founding of the Sanitarium Health and Wellbeing Company, which manufactures Veggie Delights plant-based meats. In 2022, journalist Avery Yale Kamila said that White's "profound and lasting influence on vegetarian food in the United States continues today."

== Biographical writings ==
Ellen White wrote her own biography first published in 1851 as A Sketch of the Christian Experience and Views of Ellen G. White. This she expanded in 1880 as Life Sketches of James White and Ellen G. White which was later expanded again by White and several authors who covered the remainder of her life. Published in 1915, it remains in print as Life Sketches of Ellen G. White (abbreviated as LS).

The most comprehensive biography of White is an extensive six-volume work called "Ellen G. White: A Biography" written by her grandson, Arthur L. White. Thousands of articles and books have been written about various aspects of Ellen G. White's life and ministry. A large number of these can be found in the libraries at Loma Linda University and Andrews University, the two primary Seventh-day Adventist institutions with major research collections about Adventism. An "Encyclopedia of Ellen G. White" is being produced by two faculty at Andrews University: Jerry Moon, chair of the church history department, and Denis Fortin, dean of the Seventh-day Adventist Theological Seminary.

=== Theatre ===
Red Books: Our Search for Ellen White is a play about White, a co-founder of the Seventh-day Adventist Church, and the various perceptions of her throughout the history of the church. It was produced by the Dramatic Arts Society of Pacific Union College in California. It was based on interviews collected from over 200 individuals. The title derives from White's books, which were traditionally bound with a red cover.

=== Film ===
Produced by the Seventh-Day Adventist church in 2016, the movie Tell the World chronicles the life of Ellen G. White, "Her guidance and advice, obtained through Bible studies, as well as dreams and visions revealed by God, guided the steps of the Church in becoming a worldwide movement of compassion in the areas of health, education, community development and disaster relief."

== Examination of the prophetic value of her writings ==
Most Adventists believe White's writings are inspired and continue to have relevance for the church today. Because of criticism from the evangelical community, in the 1940s and 1950s church leaders such as LeRoy Edwin Froom and Roy Allan Anderson attempted to help evangelicals understand Seventh-day Adventists better by engaging in extended dialogue that resulted in the publication of Questions on Doctrine (1956) that explained Adventist beliefs in evangelical language.

Evangelical Walter Martin of the countercult Christian Research Institute "rejected White's prophetic claims", yet saw her "as a genuine Christian believer", unlike her contemporaries Joseph Smith, Mary Baker Eddy, and Charles Taze Russell. Kenneth Samples, a successor of Martin in his interaction with Adventism, also denies White's prophetic claims yet "believe[s] she, at minimum, had some good biblical and theological instincts".

=== Adventist statement of belief about the Spirit of Prophecy ===
Early Sabbatarian Adventists, many of whom had emerged from the Christian Connection, were anti-creedal. However, as early as 1872 Adventists produced a statement of beliefs. They refined this list during the 1890s and formally included it in the SDA Yearbook in 1931 with 22 belief statements. In 1980, the Adventist Church officially adopted 27 Fundamental Beliefs, to which it added a 28th in 2005. White is referenced in Fundamental Belief 18 "The Gift of Prophecy":

The Scriptures testify that one of the gifts of the Holy Spirit is prophecy. This gift is an identifying mark of the remnant church and we believe it was manifested in the ministry of Ellen G. White. Her writings speak with prophetic authority and provide comfort, guidance, instruction, and correction to the church. They also make clear that the Bible is the standard by which all teaching and experience must be tested. (Num. 12:6; 2 Chron. 20:20; Amos 3:7; Joel 2:28, 29; Acts 2:14-21; 2 Tim. 3:16, 17; Heb. 1:1-3; Rev. 12:17; 19:10; 22:8, 9.)

Employing an expression found in Rev. 19:10, Adventists sometimes refer to White's writings as the Spirit of Prophecy.

== Criticism ==
Roger Coon wrote a lecture arguing that certain followers of the religion were engaging in "equal but opposite dangers" in their view of White. He described one group that overdeified her, and one group that "picks and chooses" from what teachings they follow of hers.

Critics have voiced doubts as to the reliability of Ellen G. White as a prophetess and the authenticity of her visions. Ronald L. Numbers, an American historian of science, criticized White for her views on health and masturbation. Numbers argues that she plagiarized vitalist writers (such as Horace Mann and Larkin B. Coles) for her arguments against masturbation. White's book Appeal to Mothers (republished later as A Solemn Appeal containing only texts written by her; adding to the confusion James White also published a book having the same title) states that she did not copy her text from the health reform advocates and that she independently reached such conclusions. Numbers' criticism was acknowledged as significant by the staff of the White Estate, which sought to refute it in A Critique of the Book Prophetess of Health, arguing that the similarities are due to supernatural inspiration influencing each of the authors.

Other critics have accused Ellen White of plagiarism. One such was Walter T. Rea, who argued against the "original" nature of her alleged revelations in his 1982 book The White Lie. In response, the White Estate released a document to refute Rea's claims.

One of the earliest charges of plagiarism against Ellen White concerned her use of The Life and Epistles of St. Paul by W. J. Conybeare and J. S. Howson (1852) in writing Sketches From the Life of Paul (1883). The volume by Conybeare and Howson, published in the UK and copyrighted there, was later published without copyright in the US by T. Y. Crowell with the title (The) Life and Epistles of the Apostle Paul. At the time of her death, White had several copies of the Crowell publication in her library.

An 1889 article in the Healdsburg Enterprise made similar accusations, claiming this was her general practice, and concluded: "Mrs. White is a plagiarist, a literary thief."

Intellectual property attorney Vincent L. Ramik undertook a study of Ellen G. White's writings during the early 1980s, and concluded that they were "conclusively unplagiaristic." When the plagiarism charge ignited a significant debate during the late 1970s and early 1980s, the Adventist General Conference commissioned a major study by Fred Veltman to examine the issue of White's literary dependence in writing on the life of Christ. The full 2,561-page report of the "'Life of Christ Research Project" is available online, along with an abridged version. A published, condensed edition appeared in 2023. Veltman examined fifteen, randomly selected chapters of The Desire of Ages for evidence of literary dependence and concluded, "On an average we may say that 31.4 percent of the DA text is dependent to some extent on literary sources." Roger W. Coon, David J. Conklin, Denis Fortin, King and Morgan, among others, undertook the refutation of the accusations of plagiarism. At the conclusion of his report, Ramik states:

It is impossible to imagine that the intention of Ellen G. White, as reflected in her writings and the unquestionably prodigious efforts involved therein, was anything other than a sincerely motivated and unselfish effort to place the understandings of Biblical truths in a coherent form for all to see and comprehend. Most certainly, the nature and content of her writings had but one hope and intent, namely, the furthering of mankind's understanding of the word of God. Considering all factors necessary in reaching a just conclusion on this issue, it is submitted that the writings of Ellen G. White were conclusively unplagiaristic.

Ramik cleared her of breaking the law of the land and time (copyright infringement/piracy). In 1911, more than 70 years before charges of plagiarism, White wrote in the introduction to The Great Controversy her reason for quoting, in some cases without giving due credit, certain historians whose "statements afford a ready and forcible presentation on the subject." That means that she acknowledged the charges of "uncredited paraphrasing," a common literary practice of her time. Spectrum, a liberal-leaning Adventist publication, claims that, due to the plagiarism scandal, "at least the educated mainstream church" ("church" meaning SDA church) no longer buys into the claim of White's "verbal inspiration" made by some of her followers.

That Ellen White borrowed from other authors was openly acknowledged by herself (cf. GC xi–xii) and by people close to her (cf. 2SM 451–465).

— Denis Fortin & Jerry Moon, The Ellen G. White Encyclopedia

Robert Olson, secretary of the Ellen G. White Estate, said, "The church is not denying the accumulating evidence of White's copying...."

— T. Joe Willey, The Great Controversy Over Plagiary: The Last Interview of Walter Rea, Spectrum Magazine

== See also ==
- Adventism
- Adventist Baptismal Vow
- Adventist Health Studies
- Conditional Immortality
- Criticism of the Seventh-day Adventist Church
- Ellen G. White bibliography
- Inspiration of Ellen G. White
- Seventh-day Adventist Church Pioneers
- Teachings of Ellen G. White
- Three Angels' Messages
- Prophecy in the Seventh-day Adventist Church
