= William C. White =

American minister (1854–1937)

William Clarence White
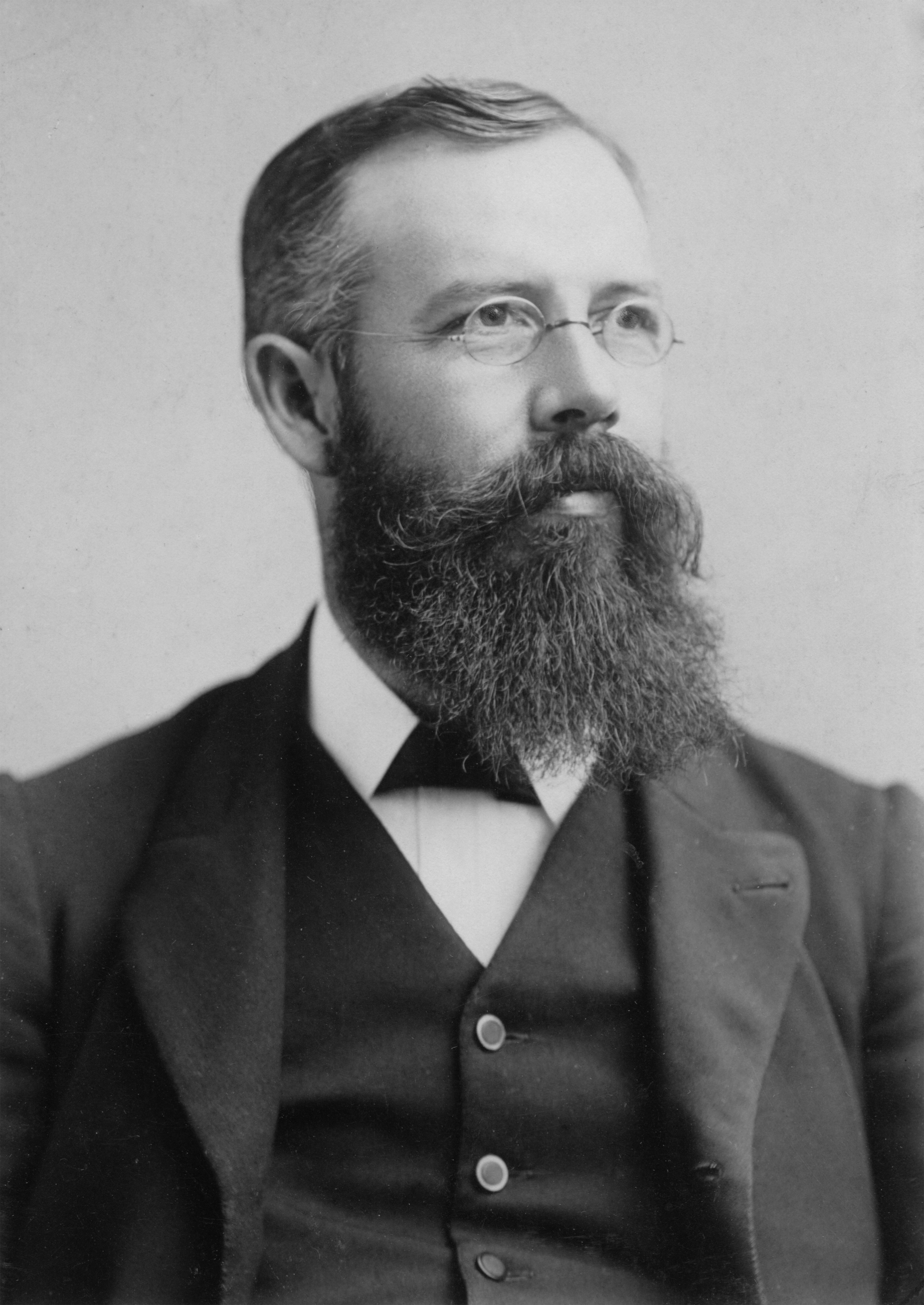
- White c. 1890
- Born: August 29, 1854; Rochester, New York, United States
- Died: September 1, 1937 (aged 83); Battle Creek, Michigan, United States
- Occupation: Seventh-day Adventist minister, Secretary of Ellen G. White Estate (1915-1937)
- Spouse(s): Mary Kelsey (1876-1890 until her death), Ethel May Lacey (1895-1937)
- Children: 3 daughters and 4 sons including Arthur L. White

William Clarence "Willie" White (29 August, 1854 – 1 September, 1937), (often referred to as W. C. White) was a son of Ellen G. White and James Springer White, two of the founders of the Seventh-day Adventist Church. He became a well-known Seventh-day Adventist minister and church leader. W.C.'s son Arthur L. White worked closely with him and succeeded his father as Secretary of the White Estate.

== Early life ==
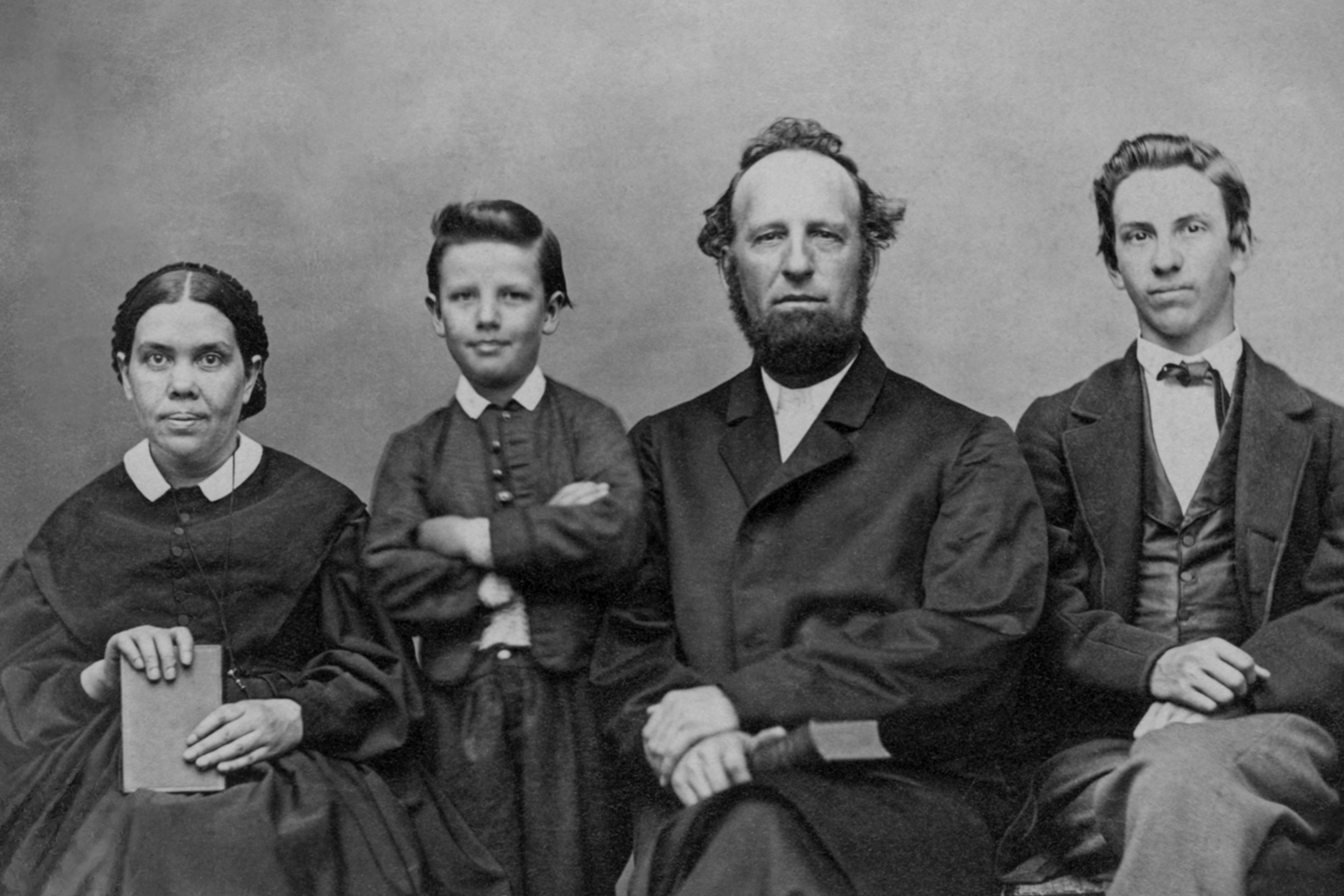
James and Ellen White family portrait

White was born in Rochester, New York, August 29, 1854. He was the third son of James and Ellen White and was better known as WC, and intimately referred to as "Willie" by his mother.

William grew up in Battle Creek and Greenville, Michigan. He attended public schools and for three years a private school conducted by GH Bell in Battle Creek. He grew up in a home that was the center of the growth of the Seventh-day Adventist Church. He listened to discussions about the advancement of the church with growing interest and understanding. He was baptized in Greenville, Michigan, at the age of 14 directly done by his father James.

== Assistant to his father ==
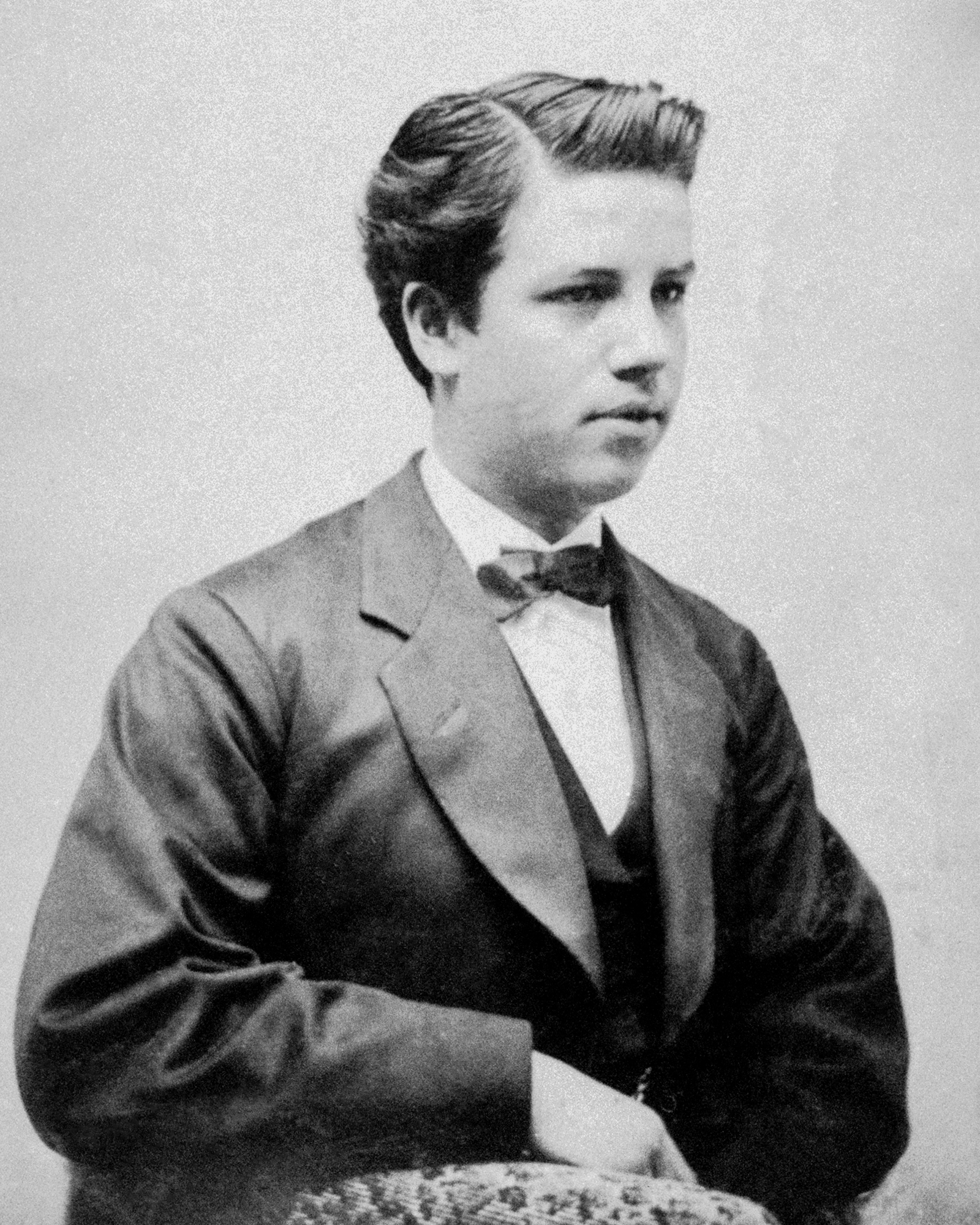
Portrait of William C. White at 14 years old

His first recommendation for denominational work came when he was only 20 years old in Oakland, California, where his father had begun to publish the Signs of the Times magazine. William task was to move with a wheelbarrow paper, printing types, printed sheets and the final product because the print was made several blocks away from the office. His expedient was filled with other activities in the office, all providing a thorough training in the field of publications.

He was associated with his father in establishing the publisher Pacific Press Publishing Association. At the age of 21 he reluctantly accepted the invitation to be chairman of the committee responsible for the project and at the end of one year presented a balance of $2000 U.S. dollars profit.

== William and Mary White ==
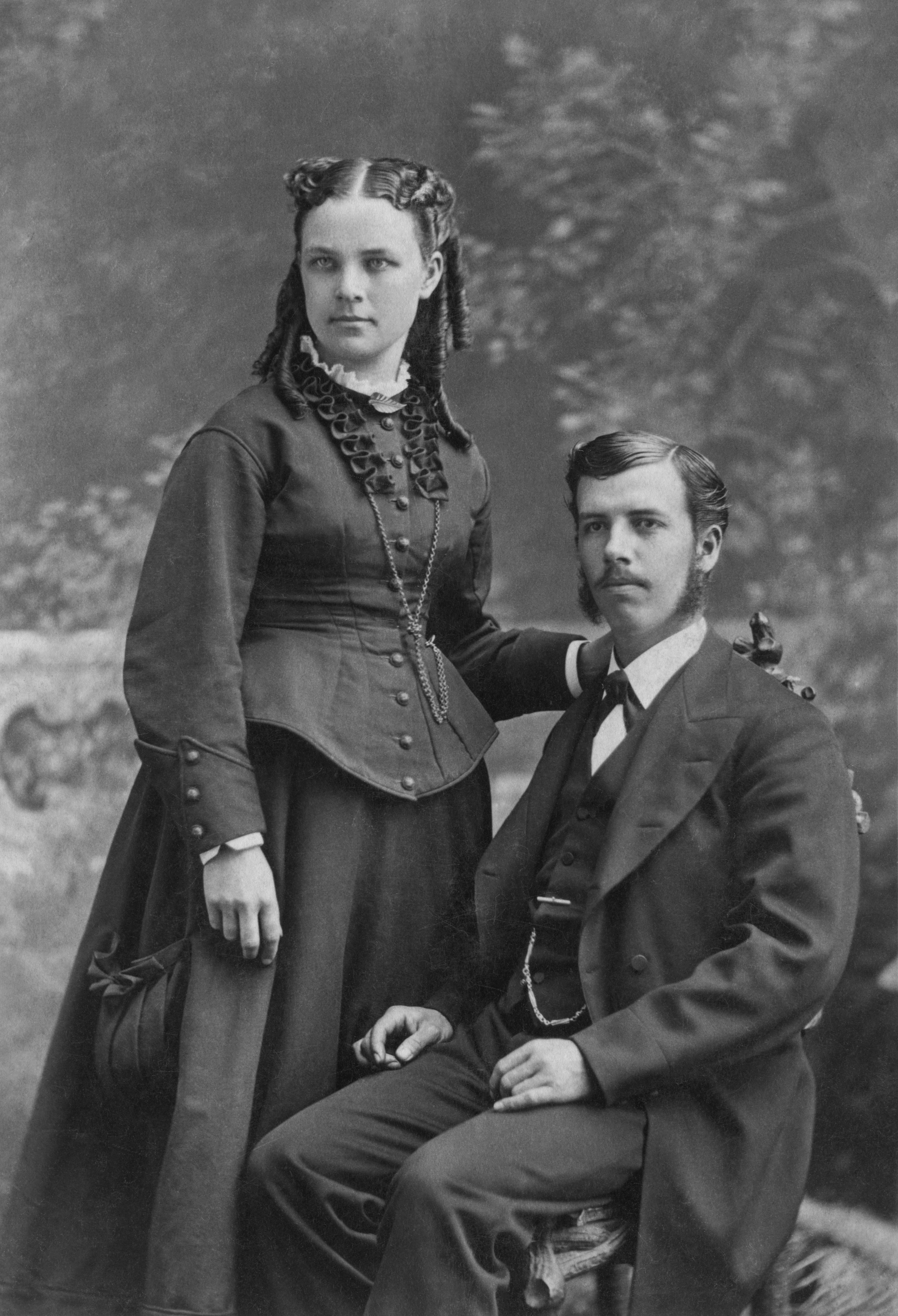
William and Mary White

He married Mary Kelsey on February 11, 1876.

The leaders decided that William and Mary White should study German and French at Battle Creek College to go to Europe assist John N. Andrews in establishing the third denominational publisher. However, due to a shortage of leaders with administrative ability, William was appointed as a student member of the school committee and was called to the publisher in Battle Creek as deputy director and also director of the Western Health Reform Institute (Western Institute for Reform health).

== Variety of leadership tasks ==
He remained in Battle Creek until 1880, devoting his time to the interests of publishing, educational and medical, and taking active part in the development of the work of the Sabbath School. Thereafter, until the summer of 1885, he was involved in activities on the Pacific coast, especially in publishing. The establishment of Healdsburg College, the second Adventist educational institution, in the spring of 1882, was one of the highlights of his work. During part of this time, he also worked as director of the General Conference Sabbath Schools. He was ordained to the ministry by the General Conference in 1883 and was chosen a member of the General Conference Committee, a position he held most of his life.

In 1883 he was called to Europe to establish publishing houses in Switzerland and Norway and to advise and assist in all lines of work in Europe. His mother, Ellen G. White, was also invited to spend some time visiting the countries of Europe, and arrived in Switzerland in September 1885, in time to attend the European Missionary Council, and spent two years fulfilling the mission for which they were called.

== Assistant to his mother; father and wife death ==
After the death of his father in August 1881, certain responsibilities to assist his mother in her travels and in the publication of her books fell on his shoulders. In 1888, when Ole A. Olsen was elected General Conference president, White served as president until the return of Olsen from Europe, six months later. His wife, Mary White, contracted tuberculosis while serving their editorial activities in Switzerland and died in 1890, at the age of 33.

During the 1890s, then up until the end of his mother's life in 1915, he was especially prominent as an influential minister in the Seventh-day Adventist Church.

== Australia ==
White and his mother, Ellen G. White, were called to Australia in 1891. Leaving his two daughters in Battle Creek, he crossed the Pacific with his mother at the end of that year. Once there, White divided his time between helping his mother and establishing the work in the new country. In 1894, he was named to lead the Australian Union. He exercised this responsibility until 1897, when in order to do justice to the literary work of his mother, he asked to be released from executive responsibilities and not be re-elected to the General Conference Committee. Meanwhile, White led a search of a rural land for a school in Australia. The property in Cooranbong was chosen in 1894 and, until he left the country, he was closely linked to the interests of the school.

== Marries Ethel May Lacey; returns to the United States ==
In May 1895, White married Ethel May Lacey in Glenorchy, Tasmania. In September 1900, when Ellen G. White returned to the United States and acquired Elmshaven near Sanitarium St. Helena, he also returned and resided nearby.

== His mother's later years and estate ==
Along with his mother, White attended the General Conference held in April 1901 in Battle Creek, and was the secretary of the reorganization committee of the General Conference. White spent most of his time and skills helping his mother in her travels and publications. He, along with 4 other men, was placed in charge of his mother's estate at her death in 1915 and he served as the secretary/director of the Ellen G. White Estate until his own death in 1937.

As secretary of the Committee, he was responsible for the publication of several posthumous works compiled in accordance with the provisions of the will of Mrs. White, and preparing an index to works published at the time (1926).

Although White lived and worked in California until his death in 1937, he participated in the establishment of plans for the transfer of the White Estate offices to Washington, DC, which was made shortly after his death.

== Later years ==
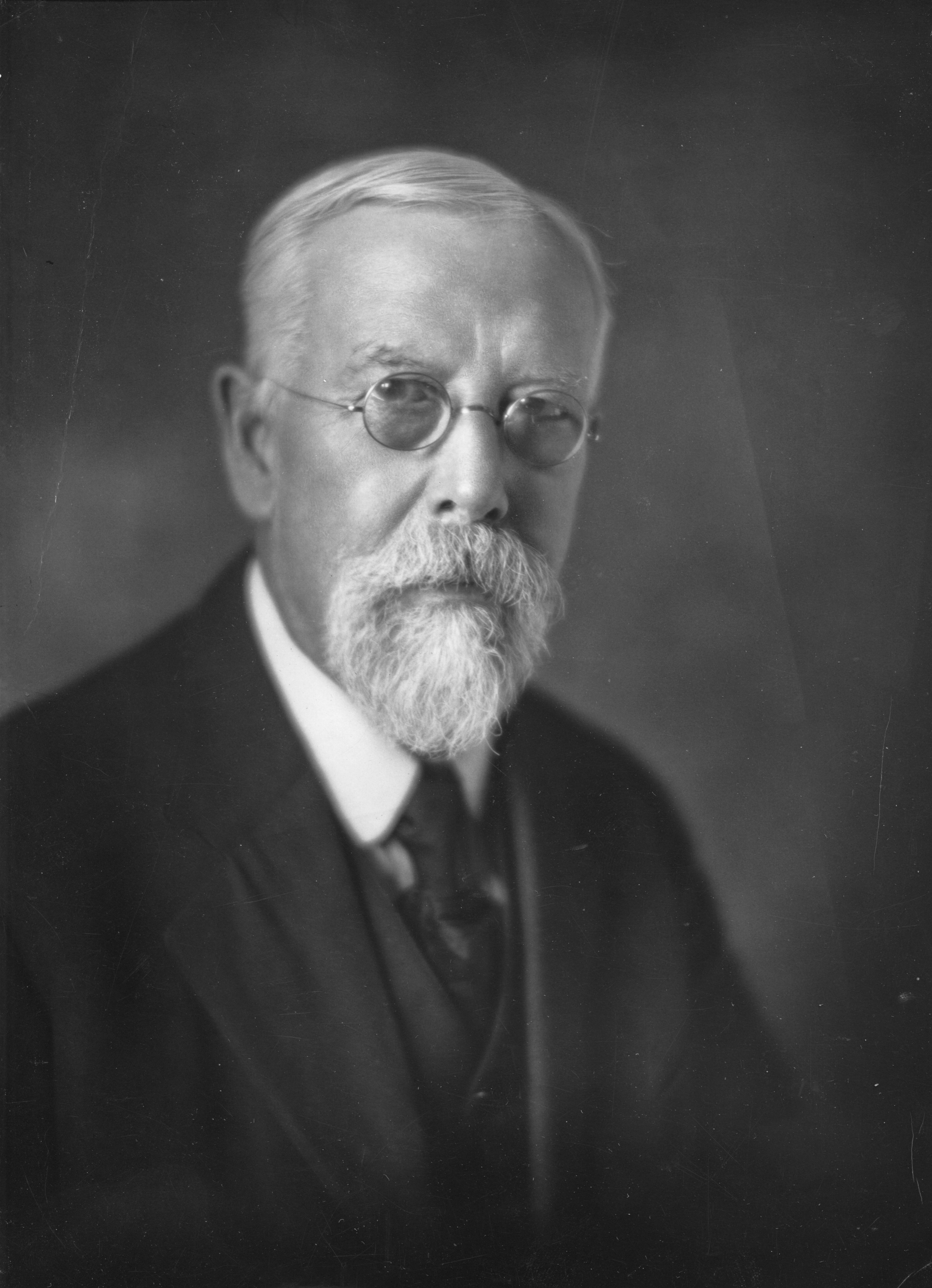
Portrait of William C. White at age 66.

There was no branch of the work that White was not interested in. His advice was often sought. He actively worked until his death at the age of 83. At the time, besides being the secretary of Trustees of the Writings of Ellen G. White and member of the General Conference Committee, he served on the Committees of the Sanitarium St. Helena and Pacific Union College.

White had four sons and three daughters. One son, Arthur L. White, succeeded his father as secretary of the White Estate.

=== Cause of death ===
3 days after his 83rd birthday, on 31 August, White retired early because of long and busy day at work. Later on the night of 31 August to 1 September, he complained about his shortness of breath, which was a heart embolism. White died due to it on the morning of September 1, 1937. The funerals were held in California and the Battle Creek Tabernacle in Michigan on September 9, 1937. He was buried with his family in Oak Hill Cemetery, Battle Creek, Michigan.

== Biography ==
The definitive biography of W. C. White is a doctoral dissertation by Jerry Moon, chair of the Church History Department of the Seventh-day Adventist Theological Seminary. His dissertation was published as: W. C. White and Ellen G. White: The Relationship Between the Prophet and Her Son (Berrien Springs, MI: Andrews University Press, 1993) (publisher's page).

== Publications ==
In the years following his mother's death in 1915, W. C. White wrote a series of articles reviewing his mother's life. These articles appeared in the official journal of the Seventh-day Adventist Church, the Review and Herald.

== See also ==
- Seventh-day Adventist Church
- Seventh-day Adventist eschatology
- Seventh-day Adventist theology
- Seventh-day Adventist worship
- Pillars of Adventism
- Second Coming
- Historicism
- Sabbath in seventh-day churches
- History of the Seventh-day Adventist Church
- Ellen G. White
- Ellen G. White Estate
- Arthur L. White
- James Springer White
- James Edson White

Preceded by (founding secretary) Ellen G. White	Secretary of the Ellen G. White Estate; 1915–1937	Succeeded by Arthur L. White
