= Seventh-day Adventist Church pioneers =

Group of Seventh-day Adventists

The Seventh-day Adventist Church pioneers were members of Seventh-day Adventist Church, part of the group of Millerites who came together after the Great Disappointment across the United States and formed the Seventh-day Adventist Church. In 1860, the pioneers of the fledgling movement settled on the name, Seventh-day Adventist, representative of the church's distinguishing beliefs. Three years later, on May 21, 1863, the General Conference of Seventh-day Adventists was formed and the movement became an official organization.

== Overview ==
The Seventh-day Adventist Church had its roots in the Millerite movement of the 1830s and 1840s, during the period of the Second Great Awakening, and was officially founded in 1863. Prominent figures in the early church included Hiram Edson, James Springer White and his wife Ellen G. White, Joseph Bates, and J. N. Andrews.

Many of the Adventist pioneers first began their work when they were teenagers. When the Seventh-day Adventist Church was newly formed, it was teenagers and young adults who held many leadership positions and helped to build up the church. Pioneers such as Ellen Harmon White, John Loughborough, J. N. Andrews, and Uriah Smith were teenagers and young adults when they began making an impact in the Seventh-day Adventist Church, many starting even before in the Advent movement started by William Miller.

William Miller was a farmer, and Baptist preacher, who, from 1831 to 1844 began the Millerite movement, preaching the imminent return of Christ. After the War of 1812 he was converted and began a systematic study of the Bible and in the process he discovered the prophecies of Daniel and Revelation, especially Daniel 8, which seemed to predict that Christ would soon return to earth. Hundreds of ministers and laymen joined in preaching the message. By the expected time for Christ's return, Miller had between 50,000 and 100,000 followers, commonly known as Millerites. After the disappointment of October 22, 1844, which Miller and many of the leaders of the first movement accepted as the date, groups of Millerites formed what later became the Seventh-day Adventist Church. Pioneer Ellen White has written positively about Miller in The Great Controversy and elsewhere. She heard him preach, and accepted his teachings, going through the disappointment at age 16. She believed that his preaching fulfilled the prophecies of Scripture, and saw him being guided by the Lord.

== Pioneers ==
=== John Nevins Andrews ===
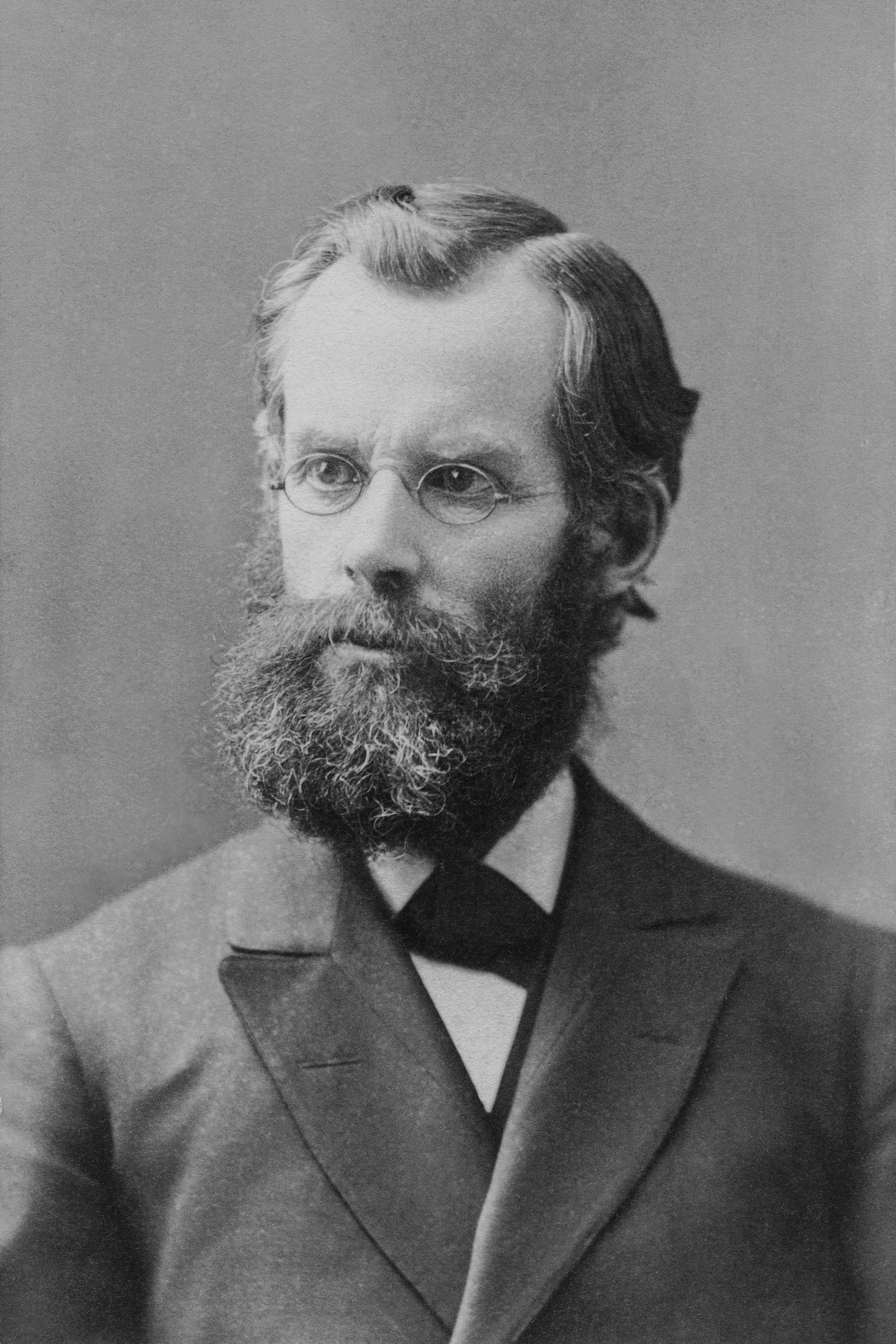
John Nevins Andrews.

John Nevins Andrews (July 22, 1829 in Poland, Maine – October 21, 1883 in Basel, Switzerland), was a Seventh-day Adventist minister, missionary, writer, editor, and scholar. J. N. Andrews was the first SDA missionary sent to countries outside North America. He was the most prominent author and scholar of his time, in the Adventist church.

Andrews became a Millerite in February 1843 and began to observe the seventh-day Sabbath in 1845. He met James White and Ellen G. White in September 1849. Later, the Whites boarded with the Andrews family.

In 1850 he began itinerant pastoral ministry in New England and ordained in 1853. Andrews played a pivotal role in the establishment of Adventist theology. Among his more memorable achievements in Adventist prophetic interpretation, was identifying the two-horned beast of Revelation as the United States of America.

On October 29, 1856, Andrews married Angeline Stevens (1824–1872) in Waukon, Iowa, where the Andrews and Stevens families had recently moved. In June 1859 a conference in Battle Creek voted that Andrews should assist J. N. Loughborough in tent evangelism in Michigan. He returned to Iowa in the fall of 1860. During these years their first two children were born: Charles (b. 1857) and Mary (b. 1861) and wrote the first edition of his most famous book, The History of the Sabbath and the First Day of the Week (Battle Creek Steam Press, 1859).

In June 1862 John left Waukon to work with the evangelistic tent in New York and assisted in the founding of the New York Conference. In February 1863 Angeline and their two children moved from Iowa to join him in New York. Two more children were born to John and Angelina while in New York, both of whom died in infancy from tuberculosis. In 1864, John was chosen as the denominational representative to the provost marshal general in Washington, D.C., to secure recognition for the church as noncombatants. In 1867 he became the third president of the General Conference, (until May 18, 1869) after which he became editor of the Review and Herald (1869–1870), now the Adventist Review.

In 1874 after his wife Angeline died from a stroke, John, along with his two surviving children, Charles and Mary, were sent as the first official Seventh-day Adventist missionaries to Europe. Andrews helped start a publishing house in Switzerland and an Adventist periodical in French, Les Signes des Temps (1876).

As a theologian Andrews made significant contributions to the development of various doctrines of the SDA denomination. Andrews’ extensive writings on the subject of the seventh-day Sabbath in history were published in a book entitled History of the Sabbath and the First Day of the Week.

Andrews was also active helping in the development of church organization. He was chairman of a three-man committee to suggest a plan of organization for the denominational publishing house, also chairman of a committee to draft a constitution and bylaws for the central organization of the church. During the Civil War, Andrews represented the church in Washington, D.C., to explain why SDA's believe that participation in combat is contrary to Christian principles, with the result that SDA draftees could apply for noncombatant service.

=== Joseph Bates ===
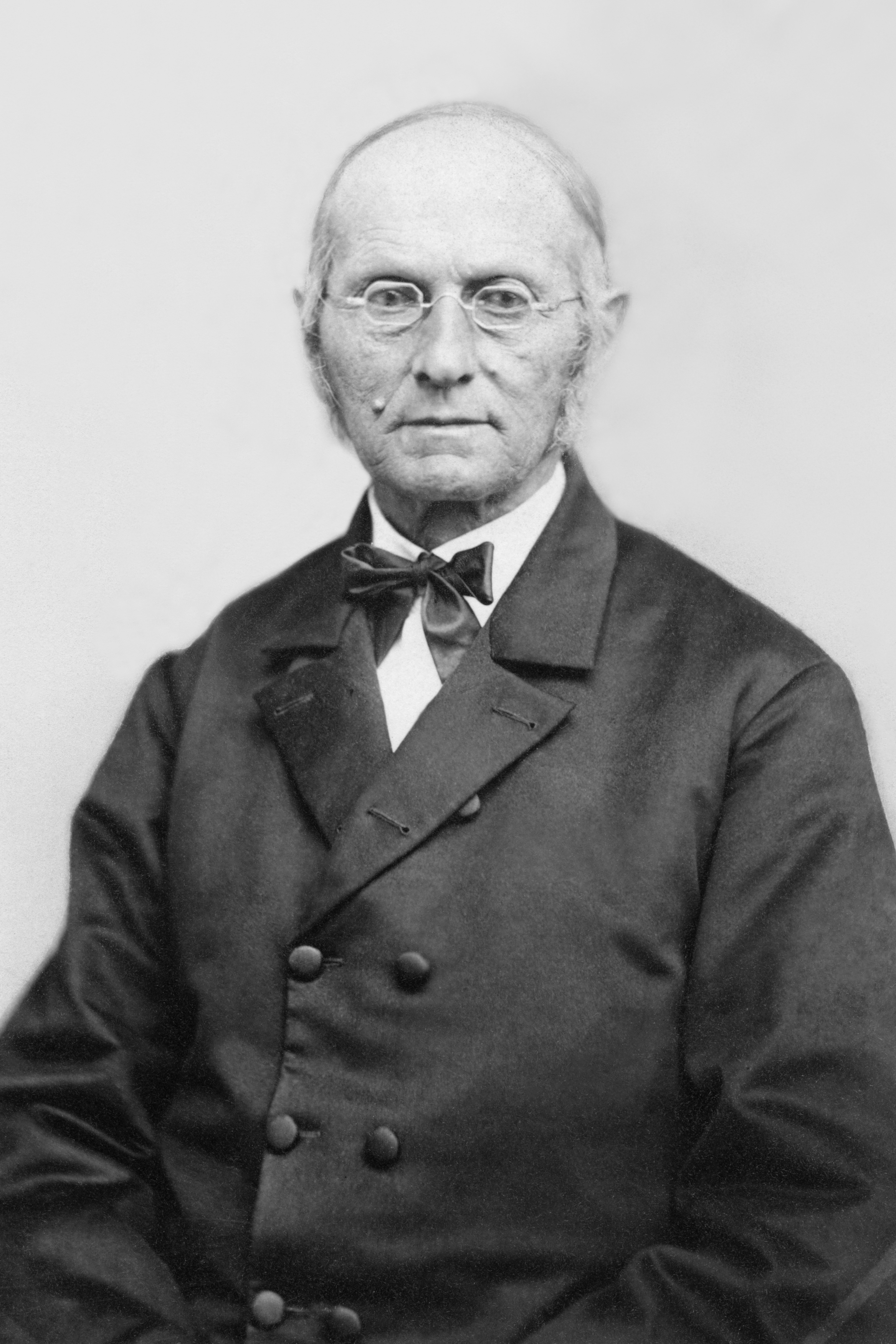
Joseph Bates.

Joseph Bates (July 8, 1792 – March 19, 1872) was an American seaman and revivalist minister. He was the founder and developer of Sabbatarian Adventism, a strain of religious thinking that evolved into the Seventh-day Adventist Church. Bates is also credited with convincing James White and Ellen G. White of the validity of the seventh-day Sabbath.

Joseph Bates was born in Rochester, Massachusetts on July 8, 1792. (He did not have a middle name.) His father, also named Joseph, was a volunteer in the American Revolutionary War and his mother was the daughter of Barnabas Rye of Sandwich, Massachusetts.

In June 1807, Bates sailed as cabin boy on the new ship commanded by Elias Terry, called the Fanny to London via New York City. This was the commencement of Bates sailing career. and after subsequent voyages he emerged as a captain of a ship and owner of vessels. During one of his voyages he read a copy of the Bible that his wife packed for him. He experienced conversion and became involved in a variety of reforms including helping to found an early temperance society.

During the spring of 1845 Bates accepted the seventh-day Sabbath after reading a pamphlet by T. M. Preble. Bates soon became known as the "apostle of the Sabbath" and wrote several booklets on the topic. One of the first, published in 1846, was entitled The Seventh Day Sabbath, a Perpetual Sign. One of Bates' most significant contribution was his ability to connect theologically the Sabbath with a unique understanding of the heavenly sanctuary. This apocalyptic understanding of theology would become known as the Great Controversy theme.

Joseph Bates was a strong supporter of James White and the prophetic gift, which he believed was manifested in visions received by the young Ellen G. White. He contributed to early publications such as A Word to the "Little Flock." Bates was active with the Whites in participating in a series of Bible Conferences held in 1848 to 1850 that have become known as the Sabbath and Sanctuary Conferences. During the 1850s Bates supported the development of more formal church organization that culminated in 1863 with the formation of the Seventh-day Adventist Church.

Joseph Bates died on March 19, 1872, in Battle Creek, Michigan and is buried in Poplar Hill Cemetery in Monterey, Michigan.

=== John Byington ===
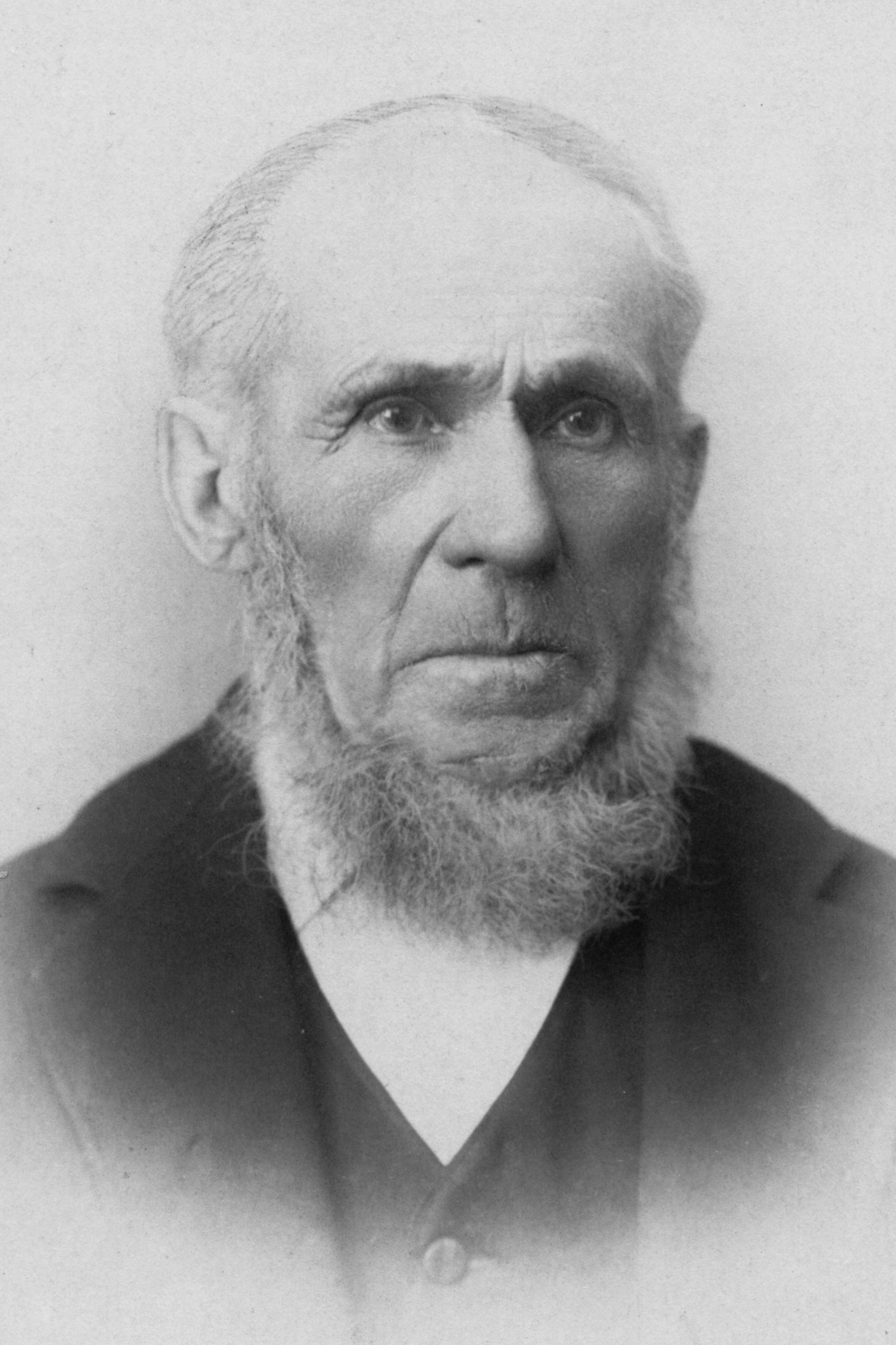
John Byington.

John Byington (1798–1887) was a lay preacher and first president of the newly organized Seventh-day Adventist church. Born in Vermont, son of a Methodist preacher who had served as a soldier in the Revolutionary army. John was baptized into the Methodist church at age 17. He shortly was given a license to preach as a lay preacher.

After moving to New York state, he helped build a house of worship for the Methodist Church around 1837 in Buck's Bridge. He became strongly involved in the antislavery movement, which eventually led to a schism in the Methodist church. John joined the new Wesleyan Methodist Church and helped to build its church building and parsonage in Morley.

In 1844 he heard sermons on the soon coming of Christ, and began studying the prophecies. In 1852 H. W. Lawrence gave him a copy of the Review and Herald containing articles on the seventh-day Sabbath. He accepted the Sabbath truth before the year was out, and was baptized. He helped then to build the first Sabbath-keeping Adventist church built for that purpose. James & Ellen White invited the Byingtons to move to Battle Creek in 1858. John bought a farm nearby, and from there would travel to minister to the scattered believers. In 1863 at age 65 he accepted the first presidency of the newly organized Seventh-day Adventist church. He worked as a genuine shepherd and pastor during his term in office. Then he returned to his farm, but continued his visitation of believers throughout Michigan for the next 22 years. "I must feed the lambs of the flock," he wrote.

=== Daniel T. Bourdeau ===
Daniel T. Bourdeau (1835–1905)

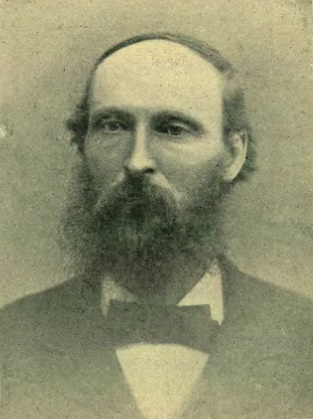
Daniel T. Bourdeau

Daniel T. Bourdeau was an evangelist and missionary, and brother of A. C. Bourdeau. At 11 years of age he joined the Baptist Church and at 16, with his brother, attended a Baptist French-language institution at Grand Ligne, Lower Canada. In 1861 he married Marion E. Saxby. Ordained to the SDA ministry in 1858, he, with his brother, spent many years in evangelism in New England and Canada. As far as is known, the two brothers were the first of French descent to have accepted the SDA faith. In 1868, with J. N. Loughborough, he responded to a call from an SDA group in California, headed by M. G. Kellogg, to open SDA work in that State. When he returned to the East in 1870 he resumed work among the French-speaking people and organized churches in Wisconsin and Illinois. In 1876 he went to Europe to spend a year of evangelistic work in Switzerland, France, and Italy, and associated with J. N. Andrews in editorial work. Again in 1882, with his brother, he took up evangelistic work in Europe, working in France, Switzerland, Corsica, Italy, and Alsace-Lorraine. Altogether he spent seven years overseas. On returning to America (1888), he continued as a minister and writer, working at first for French-speaking people, and then largely for the English folks.

=== Merritt Eaton Cornell ===
Merritt E. Cornell (1827–1893) Born in New York state, and raised from age 10 in Michigan, Merritt Cornell early believed the advent message, and dedicated his life to preaching it. In 1852 he was shown and believed the Sabbath truth, and immediately began sharing it with others, J. P. Kellogg and Cornell's father-in-law, Henry Lyon, being among the first persons he met. Both accepted the Bible evidence for the seventh day sacredness. With J. N. Loughborough during 1854 in Battle Creek he held the first Sabbatarian Adventist tent meetings. He continued to be active in evangelism, working at various times with Hiram Case, James White, J. H. Waggoner, R. J. Lawrence, D. M. Canright, and J. O. Corliss. His wife, Angeline, assisted him in evangelism. He traveled from Maine to California and to several states in the South, defending Seventh-day Adventist views of scripture in public debate, holding evangelistic meetings, and writing articles and news items about his experiences for the Review and Herald. Like Peter of old, he was headstrong and had other serious character faults, with which the Lord labored with him, sending messages through Ellen White. For some 13 years, from 1876 to 1889 he was not connected with the organized work, but continued some free-lance preaching for part of that time. In 1886 Ellen White wrote that he was "a deeply repenting man, humbled in the dust." For the last three years of his life, he was again in the ministry.

=== O. R. L. Crosier ===
Owen Russell Loomis Crosier (1820-1912) was a Millerite preacher and editor, from Canandaigua, New York. He collaborated with Hiram Edson and Dr. F. B. Hahn in publishing a small Millerite paper, the Day-Dawn. He was with Edson on the morning after the great disappointment on October 22, 1844. Edson received an inspiration from God which explained that the Millerites’ error was not in the date, but in the event; that Jesus had begun His work as High Priest in the most holy place in Heaven. Crosier, Edson, and Hahn joined to study the subject, and Crosier was selected to write out their findings on the subject of the sanctuary and its cleansing. Joseph Bates and James White were among those Millerites who were convinced by the resulting article. When Ellen White read the second and expanded printing of the article published in the Day-Star Extra, of February 7, 1846, she immediately recommended it to the brethren as "true light." When Elder Bates presented the Sabbath message to a group at Edson's, Crosier at first accepted the new light and kept the Sabbath. But eventually, he abandoned Sabbath keeping, and also his early sanctuary view. Even though Crosier made no contribution other than the development of our early views of the sanctuary, this doctrine is unique to the Seventh-day Adventist Church. The plan of salvation is perfectly typified and beautifully explained by the services carried out in the tabernacle Moses built.

=== Hiram Edson ===
Hiram Edson (1806–1882) was a pioneer of the Seventh-day Adventist Church, known for introducing the investigative judgment doctrine to reveal to the early Sabbath-keeping Adventists the meaning of the cleansing of the sanctuary. The understanding of the investigative judgment was given to the members when Hiram Edson felt he was given it after a night of prayer after the Great Disappointment to explain why Jesus had not come: the sanctuary needed to be cleansed and a review of the records in heaven needed to be completed before Christ would appear. With Joseph Bates and James White, he was one of the pioneers who developed the Seventh-day Adventist movement.

In the 1840s he lived on a farm near Port Gibson, New York, a little town on the Erie Canal almost midway between Albany and Buffalo. The Millerite message came to Rochester, New York, in 1843 and soon spread to Port Gibson. The message was based on the preaching of William Miller and predicted that Christ would return about the year 1843, which was later refined to October 22, 1844. This belief was based on the day-year principle and an interpretation of the 2300 days mentioned in Daniel 8:14 which predicted that "the sanctuary would be cleansed". The Millerites understood this verse to point to Christ's return to "cleanse" the earth. On October 22, 1844, on his farm about a mile south of town, the Adventists gathered to await the coming of the King. But Christ did not come as they expected.

On the morning of October 23 came an answer to their prayers for light, as they were passing through Edson's cornfield where he claimed to have seen a vision. In this vision, Edson came to understand that "the cleansing of the sanctuary" meant that Jesus was moving from the Holy Place to the Most Holy Place in the heavenly sanctuary, and not to the Second Coming of Jesus to earth: Edson shared this light with his friends, Owen Crosier and Dr. F. B. Hahn of nearby Canandaigua. They determined to study the sanctuary and its cleansing from the Biblical viewpoint. The results of their research appeared in their little advent paper published in Canandaigua, the Day Dawn, and later also in the Day Star, Cincinnati. From this point on, light came to the disappointed Adventists, and the "why" of their pain and disappointment began to dawn upon them.

It was Edson who advanced funds to purchase the first Seventh-day Adventist press. It was at Edson's home in Port Gibson that the third Sabbath Conference of 1848 was held. Edson sold his farm, turned to preaching and became a successful evangelist. In his later life he labored near Roosevelt, New York, on Long Island. For years he was leader of the church's work there. He lies buried in the Roosevelt cemetery.

He died on January 8, 1882.

=== John Norton Loughborough ===
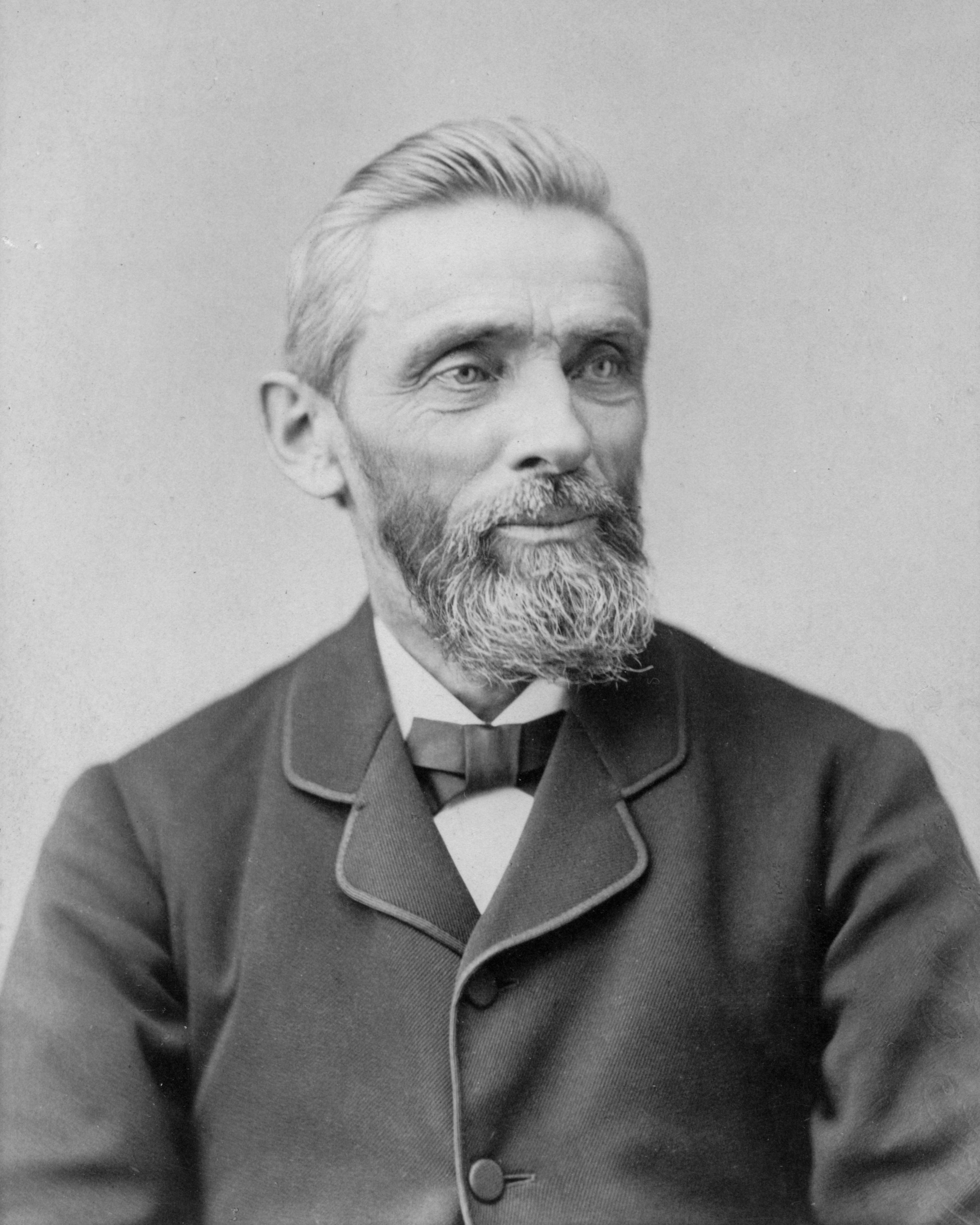
Photograph of John Loughborough

John Norton Loughborough (1832 – April 7, 1924) was an early Seventh-day Adventist minister. He first heard the present truth preached by J. N. Andrews in September 1852 at Rochester, New York, and was immediately convinced of the seventh-day Sabbath. He took a public position to keep the Sabbath in October 1852 and immediately began to proclaim his new belief.

Loughborough was involved in the Seventh-day Adventist movement from its early days, having been called to preach by Ellen White in 1852. He was ordained in 1854, and for several years conducted evangelistic work in Pennsylvania, New York State, and the Middle West. He pioneered the selling of Adventist literature in quantity when in 1854 he began selling it at 35 cents a packet at one of his tent meetings in Michigan. He worked for the church in New England, Michigan, Ohio, Great Britain, and California. As a result of a serious illness brought on by overwork (1865), he became deeply interested in health reform and wrote a book called Hand Book of Health; or a Brief Treatise on Physiology and Hygiene (1868).

In 1868 with D. T. Bordeau, he pioneered Seventh-day Adventist work in California, and in 1871 had helped establish five churches in Sonoma County, one of them in Santa Rosa, where the first Seventh-day Adventist Church building west of the Rockies was erected in 1869. He baptized the first three SDA members in Nevada in 1878. In 1878 Ellen White told him that his work for the church "must be made to tell for its full value".

The same year (1878) he was sent by the General Conference to open SDA work in England, although the field had been prepared previously by the work of William Ings, a colporteur. Loughborough's five years in England resulted in the baptism of 37 persons and the establishing of a church in Southampton.

After his return to America (1883), he traveled as a representative of the General Conference in the North Pacific region, visiting camp meetings and strengthening members who had become confused because of apostate movements.

He was president of the Michigan Conference (1865–1868), was treasurer of the General Conference (1868–1869), and for six years (1890–1896) was superintendent of several General Conference districts. He was also first president of the California Conference (1873–1878; again, 1887–1890), and of the Nevada Association (1878), the Upper Columbia Conference (1884–1885), and the Illinois Conference (1891–1895).

In 1892 he published The Rise and Progress of the Seventh-day Adventists, the first denominational history (revised in 1905 as The Great Second Advent Movement). He published a number of other books, among them The Church, Its Organization, Order, and Discipline (1907), which for many years served in place of the church manual, and wrote many articles for denominational papers and edited the Pacific Health Journal for a time.

Loughborough made a world tour in 1908, including Europe, Africa, Australia, and New Zealand in his itinerary.

He published an account of the message and history of Seventh-day Adventism in 1902 titled The Rise and Progress of the Third Angel's Message, but the book was lost when the Review and Herald burned in Battle Creek, Michigan, in 1903. He then published another book, The Great Second Advent Movement, in 1905. In it, Loughborough describes his first-hand experiences in the history of the church, the visions and prophecies of Ellen White, early divisions in the church, and various philosophical and religious matters, as well as some autobiographical material.

=== Uriah Smith ===
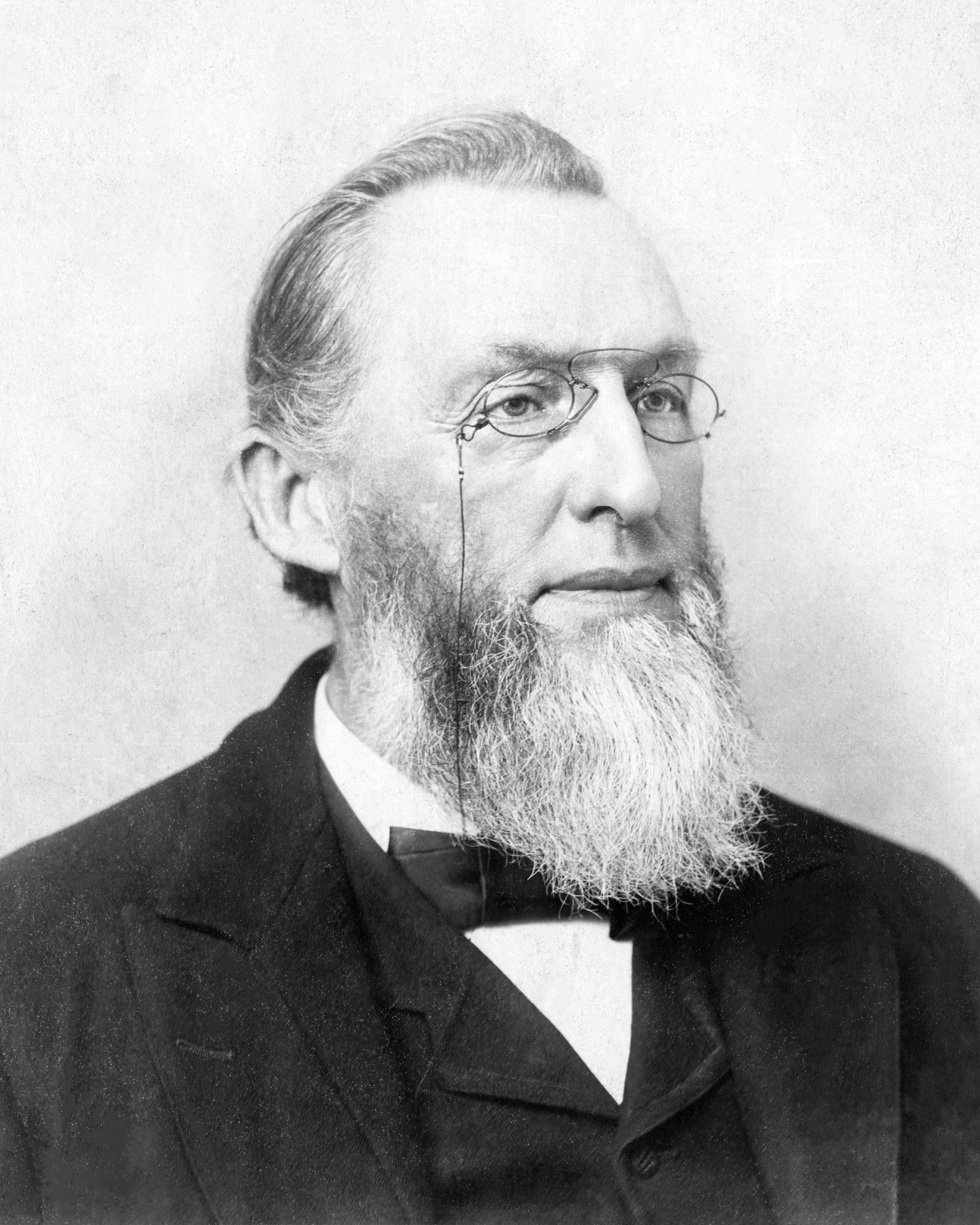
Portrait of Uriah Smith

Uriah Smith (May 3, 1832 – March 6, 1903) was a Seventh-day Adventist author and editor who worked for the Review and Herald (now the Adventist Review) for 50 years. His book Daniel and the Revelation became the classic text on Adventist end-time beliefs.

His family was Millerite Adventists so at the age of twelve he went through the 1844 disappointment. Around 1852, he became involved in the early Seventh-day Adventist Church and became a Sabbath keeping Adventist; then the next year he joined James and Ellen White in the publishing work in Rochester, New York. In 1853, he published his first contribution- a 35 000 word poem entitled “The Warning Voice of Time Prophecy.” Uriah became the editor of Review (now the Adventist Review) in 1855 at age 23 and served for almost 50 yrs as editor or editorial staff. He taught Bible at Battle Creek College and also served as the secretary of General Conference when it started in 1863. His main contribution to Adventist theology was a commentary on the prophetic Biblical books of Daniel and the Revelation, but he also wrote extensively on conditional immortality and other topics. He advocated religious liberty, the abolition of slavery, and noncombatancy for Adventists.

In 1903, at the age of 71, Smith died of a stroke on his way to the Review office.

=== Stephen Haskell ===
Stephen N. Haskell (1833–1922) Stephen Haskell was an evangelist and administrator. Stephen Haskell began preaching for First-day Adventists in 1853, but the same year, after reading a tract on the Sabbath, he became a Sabbath keeper at the age of 20. Following some years in self-supporting work in New England, he was ordained in 1870 and became president of the New England Conference, serving from 1870 to 1887. While in that position, he served three times president of the California Conference (1879–1887, 1891–1894, 1908–1911) and also of the Maine Conference (1884–1886).

He also founded South Lancaster Academy (now Atlantic Union College) in 1882. In 1885 Elder Haskell was in charge of the first group of Seventh-day Adventist missionaries who went to open the work in Australia. Together with two other Adventist preachers, John Corliss and Mendel Israel, he helped start the Signs Publishing Company first began as the Echo Publishing Company, in North Fitzroy, a suburb of Melbourne, which by 1889, was the third largest Seventh-day Adventist publishing house in the world. From 1889 to 1890 he made a round-the-world tour on behalf of Adventist missionary work. His first wife died in 1894, and in 1897 he remarried, this time to a Bible worker named Hetty Hurd. Stephen and Hetty did evangelistic and Bible work in Australia and the United States. In addition, he also authored several books including The Story of Daniel the Prophet, The Story of the Seer of Patmos, and The Cross and Its Shadow. Elder Haskell died in California in 1922.

=== Ellen G. White ===
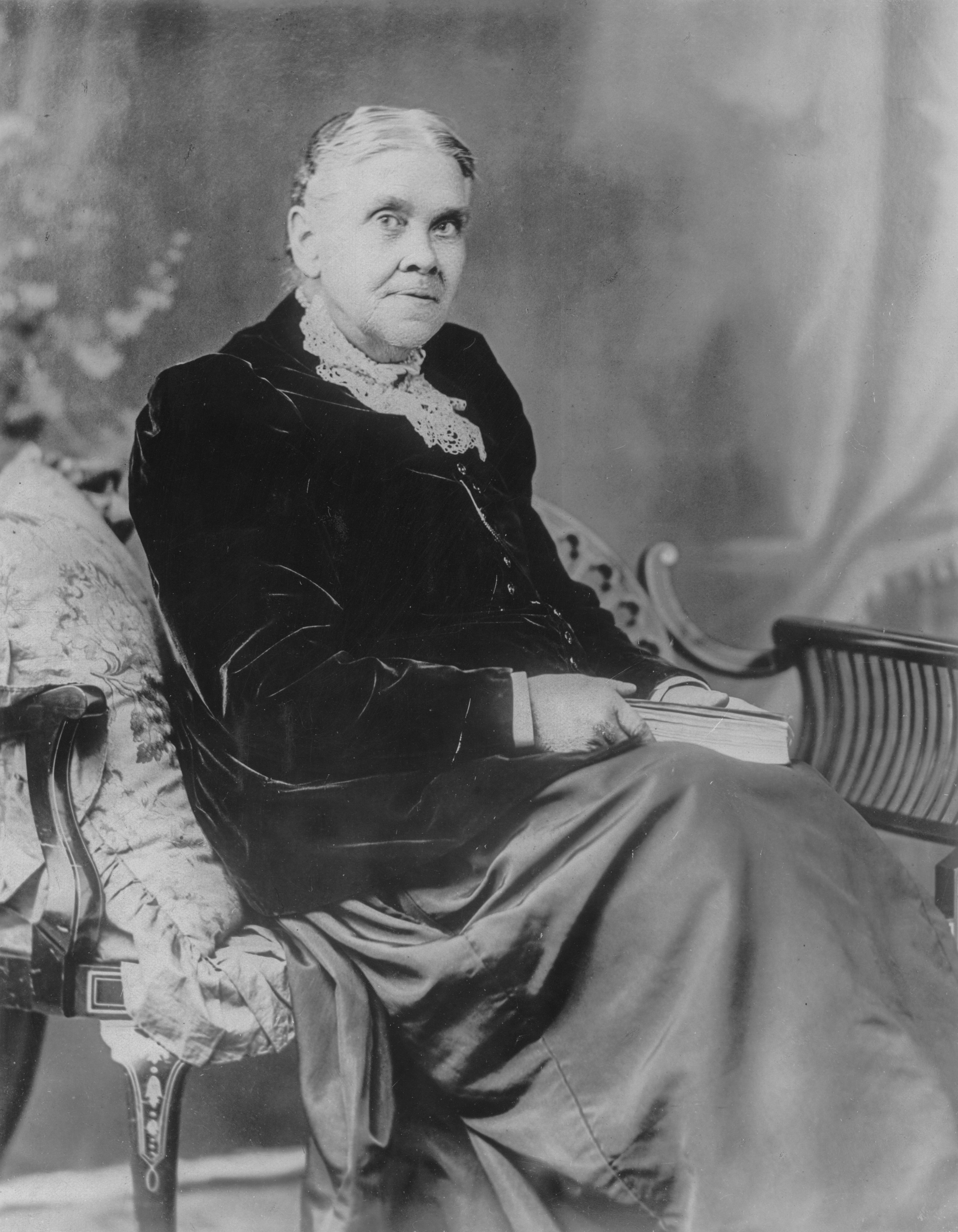
Ellen White in 1899.

Ellen Gould White (born Harmon) (November 26, 1827 – July 16, 1915) was a prolific Christian author and one of the American Christian pioneers whose ministry was instrumental in founding the seventh-day Adventist movement that led to the rise of the Seventh-day Adventist Church.

Seventh-day Adventist believe she had the spiritual gift of prophecy as outlined in Revelation 19:10. Her restorationist writings endeavor to showcase the hand of God in Christian history. This cosmic conflict, referred to as the "Great Controversy theme", is foundational to the development of Seventh-day Adventist theology. Her involvement with other Sabbatarian Adventist leaders, such as Joseph Bates and her husband James White, would form what is now known as the Seventh-day Adventist Church.

White was considered a sowewhat controversial figure, though she was greatly respected especially among Seventh-day Adventists . She received a vision soon after the Millerite Great Disappointment. In the context of many other visionaries, she was known for her conviction and fervent faith. Randall Balmer has described her as "one of the more important and colorful figures in the history of American religion". Walter Martin described her as "one of the most fascinating and controversial personages ever to appear upon the horizon of religious history." White is the most translated female non-fiction author in the history of literature, as well as the most translated American non-fiction author of either gender. Her writings covered theology, evangelism, Christian lifestyle, education and health (she also advocated vegetarianism). She promoted the establishment of schools and medical centers. During her lifetime she wrote more than 5,000 periodical articles and 40 books; but today, including compilations from her 50,000 pages of manuscript, more than 100 titles are available in English. Some of her more popular books include Steps to Christ, The Desire of Ages, and The Great Controversy. Her masterpiece of successful Christian living, Steps to Christ, has been published in more than 140 languages.

Sometime in 1845 Ellen came into contact with her future husband James Springer White, a Millerite who became convinced that her visions were genuine. A year later James proposed and they were married by a justice of the peace in Portland, Maine, on August 30, 1846. James later wrote:

We were married August 30, 1846, and from that hour to the present she has been my crown of rejoicing....It has been in the good providence of God that both of us had enjoyed a deep experience in the Advent movement....This experience was now needed as we should join our forces and, united, labor extensively from the Atlantic Ocean to the Pacific....

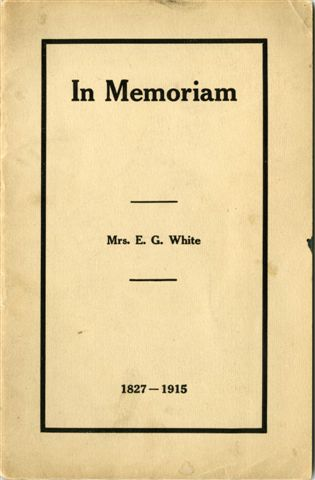

James and Ellen had four children: Henry Nichols, James Edson (known as Edson), William Clarence (known as Willie or W. C.), and John Herbert.

Only Edson and William lived to adulthood. John Herbert died of erysipelas at the age of three months, and Henry died of pneumonia at the age of 16 in 1863.

Ellen White spent the final years of her life in Elmshaven, her home in Saint Helena, California after the death of her husband James White in 1881. During her final years she would travel less frequently as she concentrated upon writing her last works for the church. Ellen G. White died July 16, 1915, at her home in Elmshaven, which is now an Adventist Historical Site.

=== James Springer White ===
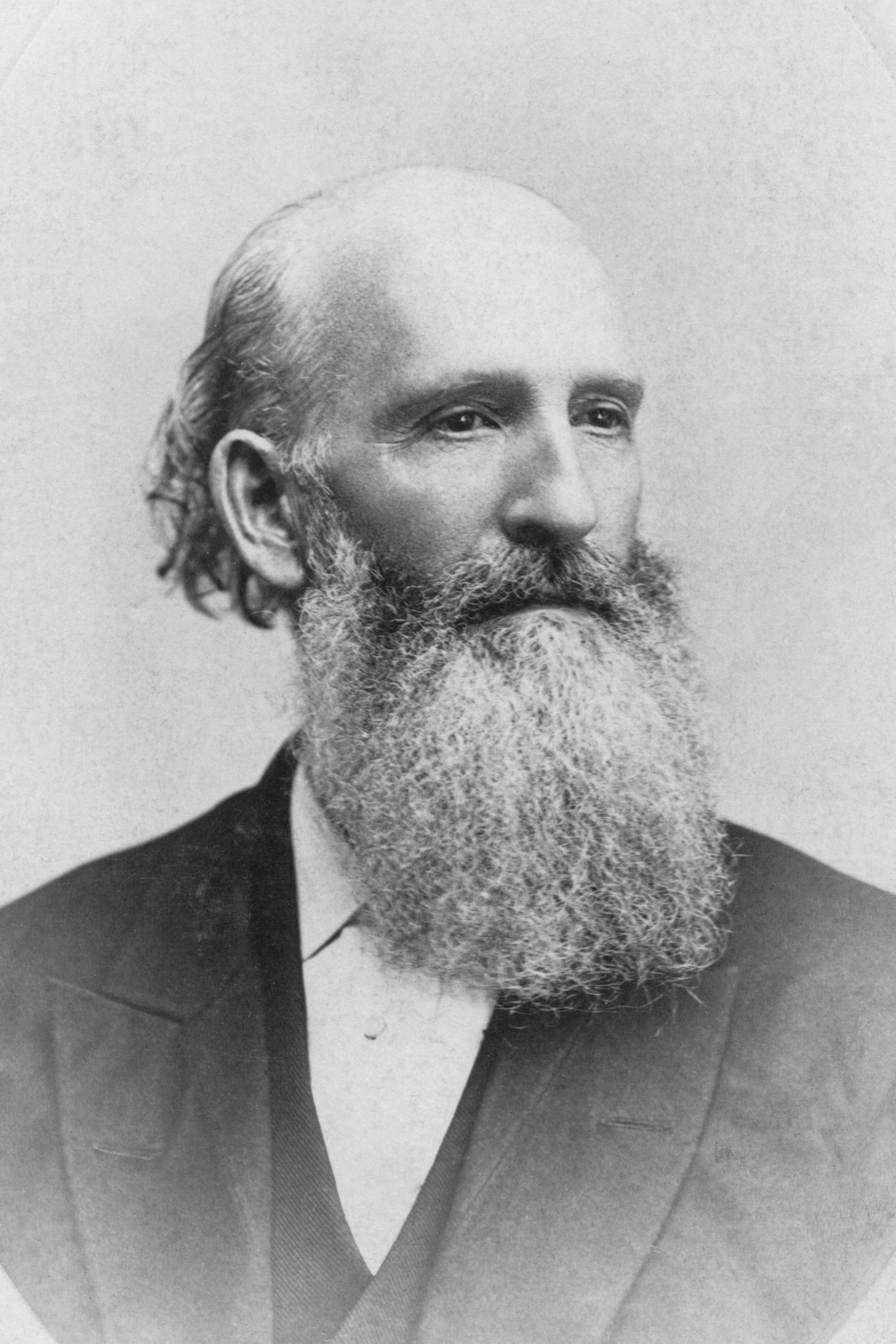
James Springer White.

James Springer White (August 4, 1821, Palmyra, Maine - August 6, 1881, Battle Creek, Michigan), also known as Elder White, was a co-founder of the Seventh-day Adventist Church and husband of Ellen G. White. In 1849 he started the first Sabbatarian Adventist periodical entitled "The Present Truth" (now the Adventist Review) in 1855 he relocated the fledgling center of the movement to Battle Creek, Michigan, and in 1863 played a pivotal role in the formal organization of the denomination. He later played a major role in the development of the Adventist educational structure beginning in 1874 with the formation of Battle Creek College (which is now Andrews University).

The paper which James White initially started, "The Present Truth", was combined with another periodical called the "Advent Review" in 1850 to become the "Second Advent Review and Sabbath Herald". This periodical became the main source of communication for the Sabbatarian Adventist movement regarding points of doctrine and organization. It also became a venue for James and Ellen White to quickly and efficiently share their views to like-minded believers. James White served as editor of the periodical until 1851 when he invited Uriah Smith to become editor. He played a senior role in the management of church publications as president of the Review and Herald Publishing Association. He also served on several occasions as president of the General Conference of Seventh-day Adventists.(1865–1867; 1869–1871; 1874–1880).

In 1865 White suffered from a paralytic stroke. White eventually determined that he should retire from the ministry and live out his days gracefully. In 1880, G. I. Butler replaced him as General Conference president. During the summer of 1881, White came down with a fever and was taken to the Battle Creek Sanitarium. Despite the efforts of Dr. Kellogg, White died on August 6, 1881.

== Major teachings of the pioneers ==
The early Adventists emphasized the concept of "present truth"—see 2 Peter 1:12 (NKJV). James White explained, “The church [has] ever had a present truth. The present truth now, is that which shows present duty, and the right position for us…” ”Present truth is present truth, and not future truth, and the Word as a lamp shines brightly where we stand, and not so plainly on the path in the distance.” Ellen White pointed out that “present truth, which is a test to the people of this generation, was not a test to the people of generations far back.” This view is echoed in the preamble to the 28 Fundamentals. "...Revision of these statements may be expected at a General Conference session when the church is led by the Holy Spirit to a fuller understanding of Bible truth or finds better language in which to express the teachings of God's Holy Word." The founders of the SDA church had a dynamic concept of what they called present truth, opposed to creedal rigidity, and had an openness to new theological understandings that built upon the landmark doctrines that had made them a people.

Yet, the possibilities of dynamic change in Seventh-day Adventist beliefs were not unlimited. Those landmark doctrines were non-negotiables in Adventist theology. Collectively they had provided the Seventh-day Adventists with an identity. In their eyes the pillars of their faith—the Bible doctrines that defined who they were as a people—had been thoroughly studied out in the Scripture and had been attested to by the convicting power of the Holy Spirit. As Ellen White put it, "When the power of God testifies as to what is truth, that truth is to stand forever as the truth. ... Men will arise with interpretations of Scripture which are to them truth, but which are not truth. The truth for this time, God has given us as a foundation for our faith. Robert Johnston noted, “Without repudiating the past leading of the Lord, it [the Seventh-day Adventist church] seeks even to understand better what that leading was. It is always open to better insights to learn—to seek for truth as for hid treasure. … Adventists are still pilgrims on a doctrinal journey who do not repudiate the way marks, but neither do they remain stopped at any of them.”

Ellen White wrote,

"There is no excuse for anyone in taking the position that there is no more truth to be revealed, and that all our expositions of Scripture are without an error. The fact that certain doctrines have been held as truth for many years by our people, is not a proof that our ideas are infallible. Age will not make error into truth, and truth can afford to be fair. No true doctrine will lose anything by close investigation."

These pillars, landmarks, way marks, are the investigative judgment, the sanctuary that brings this judgment to light, the three angel's messages of Revelation, the law of God, the faith of Jesus, the Sabbath, the state of the dead, and the special gift of prophecy.

What are the pillars of our Adventist faith? They are as follows: The Investigative Judgment. The sanctuary service or a broader understanding of the"heavenly sanctuary". The spirit of prophecy The Three Angels' Messages (exposing the papacy, Babylon, ecumenism, explaining the Sabbath-Sunday-question, exalting the law of God, etc.) The state of the dead and the exposure of spiritualism

The Investigative Judgment understanding came about from the application of the day-year principle of prophetic interpretation by William Miller and spread among his followers in the Millerite Adventist movement. who were expecting Jesus Christ to return to earth on October 22, 1844. They arrived at this date from an interpretation of the Bible verse Daniel 8:14. They understood the 2300 days to represent 2300 years (according to the day-year principle of prophetic interpretation), a time period stretching from the biblical era to the nineteenth century. However Miller had not been the first to arrive at this interpretation, as he himself emphasized. Others had earlier concluded that a prophetic period of 2300 years was to end "around the year 1843" (Miller's earlier estimate).

When Jesus did not return as expected ( an event Adventists call the "Great Disappointment") several alternative interpretations of the prophecy were put forward. The majority of Millerites abandoned the 1844 date, however some members ( including Hiram Edson and O. R. L. Crosier) concluded the event predicted by Daniel 8:14 was not the second coming, but rather Christ's entrance into the Most Holy Place of the heavenly sanctuary. Edson claimed to have a vision in a cornfield the day after the Great Disappointment, which resulted in a series of Bible studies with other Millerites to test the validity of his solution.

This became the foundation for the Adventist doctrine of the sanctuary, and the people who held it became the nucleus of what would emerge from other "Adventist" groups as the Seventh-day Adventist Church. From scripture, such as "And let them make me a sanctuary; that I may dwell among them. According to all that I shew thee, after the pattern of the tabernacle, and the pattern of all the instruments therefore, even so shall ye make it." Exodus 25:8-9. "And the temple of God was opened in heaven, and there was seen in his temple the ark of his testament." Revelation 11:19, they came to an understanding that there is a temple in heaven of which the earthly sanctuary was a pattern. This heavenly sanctuary is composed of two apartments; the first is the holy place, the second the most holy place. The revelation was greatly encouraging for the [Seventh-day] Adventists. As Ellen White wrote later, "The scripture which above all others had been both the foundation and the central pillar of the advent faith, was the declaration, 'Unto two thousand and three hundred days; then shall the sanctuary be cleansed.'" (quoting Daniel 8:14) She also predicted that criticism of the belief would come.

They believed that Christ's first apartment (holy place) ministry began at His ascension and continued until October 22, 1844, at the end of the 2300 days/years when He entered into the second apartment (most holy place) to begin His final mediatorial work of intercession, atonement, and investigative judgment to cleanse the heavenly sanctuary as our High Priest. Many of the Adventist Church pioneers came out of the Methodist or Wesleyan/Arminian branches of Protestantism which tended to have a view of emphasis on sanctification and the possibility of moral perfection in this life. Ellen White in The Great Controversy wrote the following of the perfection of those saints who stand at the end while Christ still intercedes in the Most Holy Place, and what would happen when His work was done:

“Now, while our great High Priest is making the atonement for us, we should seek to become perfect in Christ. Not even by a thought could our Saviour be brought to yield to the power of temptation. . . . This is the condition in which those must be found who shall stand in the time of trouble” (GC 623).

The urgency for attaining perfection comes from the knowledge that the remnant must live perfectly during the time of trouble at the end to prove to the universe that fallen human beings can keep the law of God. Ellen White states, “When He leaves the sanctuary, darkness covers the inhabitants of the earth. In that fearful time the righteous must live in the sight of a holy God without an intercessor.” (GC 614).

And explains this is necessary because the “earthliness” of the remnant must be cleansed that the image of Christ may be perfectly reflected: "God’s love for His children during the period of their severest trial is as strong and tender as in the days of their sunniest prosperity; but it is needful for them to be placed in the furnace of fire; their earthliness must be consumed, that the image of Christ may be perfectly reflected."(GC 621).

The Adventist Pioneers held to the belief of overcoming sin and all who will can be overcomers, and "that the final generation would become perfected, or sinless, men." Ellen White wrote "Our Saviour does not require impossibilities of any soul. He expects nothing of His disciples that He is not willing to give them grace and strength to perform. He would not call upon them to be perfect if He had not at His command every perfection of grace to bestow on the ones upon whom He would confer so high and holy a privilege." and "Our work is to strive to attain in our sphere of action the perfection that Christ in His life on the earth attained in every phase of character. He is our example. In all things we are to strive to honor God in character.... We are to be wholly dependent on the power that He has promised to give us." In addition to the many writings of Ellen White there were many others that wrote on the Great Controversy theme and how Christ withstood temptations and conquered the same as we may conquer. One of the most well known was A. T. Jones a Seventh-day Adventist known for his impact on the theology of the church, along with his friend and associate Ellet J. Waggoner. Both of whom were key participants in the 1888 Minneapolis General Conference Session a landmark event in the history of the Seventh-day Adventist Church. In addition to the message of righteousness by faith, A. T. Jones held that Christ was made "in all things" like unto us, or the fallen nature of mankind after Adam and yet overcame sin as our example and the perfection of character, is the Christian goal. and was also our example and there must be a moral and spiritual perfection of the believers before the end time. In the Consecrated Way, he wrote:

"Sanctification is the true keeping of all the commandments of God. In other words, this is to say that the will of God concerning man is that His will shall be perfectly fulfilled in man. His will is expressed in His law of ten commandments, which is "the whole duty of man." This law is perfect, and perfection of character is the perfect expression of this law in the life of the worshiper of God. By this law is the knowledge of sin. And all have sinned and have come short of the glory of God—have come short of this perfection of character....In His coming in the flesh—having been made in all things like unto us and having been tempted in all points like as we are—He has identified Himself with every human soul just where that soul is. And from the place where every human soul is, He has consecrated for that soul a new and living way through all the vicissitudes and experiences of a whole lifetime, and even through death and the tomb, into the holiest of all at the right hand of God for evermore....Perfection, perfection of character, is the Christian goal—perfection attained in human flesh in this world. Christ attained it in human flesh in this world and thus made and consecrated a way by which, in Him, every believer can attain it. He, having attained it, has become our great High Priest, by His priestly ministry in the true sanctuary to enable us to attain."

The Sabbath truth they felt was from God Himself, who after six days of creationary work, blessed, sanctified, and rested on the seventh day as His only Sabbath (Genesis 2:2-3). This was a sacred day of rest requiring abstinence from all unnecessary labor and secular work, and the performance of sacred and religious duties.

The Adventists embraced the Three Angels messages, starting with the first in Revelation 14:6-7, which changed the thinking of many denominations who today embrace the pre-millennial and literal Second Coming of Christ instead of a thousand years of peace and prosperity that was taught back in the early 19th century. Here are the verses of the Three Angels messages:

"And I saw another angel fly in the midst of heaven, having the everlasting gospel to preach unto them that dwell on the earth, and to every nation, and kindred, and tongue, and people, Saying with a loud voice, Fear God, and give glory to him; for the hour of his judgment is come: and worship him that made heaven, and earth, and the sea, and the fountains of waters."

— Revelation 14:6–7.

The first angels message was a warning message to the world: to fear God, our Creator to worship only Him, and give glory to Him for the hour of investigative judgment (first for the dead and then for the living) has come, and to proclaim the Everlasting Gospel, which involves the plan of redemption, and salvation from all sin through Jesus Christ the only Mediator between God and man.

"And there followed another angel saying, Babylon is fallen, is fallen that great city, because she made all nations drink of the wine of the wrath of her fornication." Revelation 14:8.

The second angels message was on Babylon or the false church which had fallen because they rejected the light of truth sent to them from heaven as proclaimed in the First Angel's Message.

"And the third angel followed them saying with a loud voice, If any man worship the beast and his image, and receive his mark in his forehead, or in his hand, The same shall drink of the wine of the wrath of God, which is poured out without mixture into the cup of his indignation; and he shall be tormented with fire and brimstone in the presence of the holy angels, and in the presence of the Lamb: And the smoke of their torment ascendeth up for ever and ever: and they have no rest day nor night, who worship the beast and his image, and whosoever receiveth the mark of his name. Here is the patience of the saints: here are they that keep the commandments of God, and the faith of Jesus." Revelation 14:9–12.

"And after these things I saw another angel come down from heaven, having great power; and the earth was lightened with his glory. And he cried mightily with a strong voice, saying, Babylon the great is fallen, is fallen, and is become the habitation of devils, and the hold of every foul spirit, and a cage of every unclean and hateful bird. For all nations have drunk of the wine of the wrath of her fornication, and the kings of the earth have committed fornication with her, and the merchants of the earth are waxed rich through the abundance of her delicacies. And I heard another voice from heaven, saying, Come out of her, my people, that ye be not partakers of her sins, and that ye receive not of her plagues. For her sins have reached unto heaven, and God hath remembered her iniquities." Revelation 18:1–5.

According to their interpretation of these passages, this angel proclaims a chance for repentant sinners to accept the righteousness of Christ by faith. It also warns all mankind against worshiping the beast (Papacy), or his image (apostate Protestantism), or receiving the mark of the beast which is false worship. They also believed that It also warns all of God's people to willingly separate themselves from all unclean apostate, harlot churches of Babylon.

Adventist came to understand from scripture that death is a state of silence, inactivity, and entire unconsciousness, referred to in the Bible as "sleep". The investigative judgment determines whether the dead will awaken at Christ's second coming being raised in the first resurrection to inherit everlasting life, or remaining in the grave until the second resurrection to be consumed in the lake fire which is the second death, according to their interpretation on Revelation 20:12–15.

The teaching about the non-immortality of the soul, while it may seem at odds with the majority of Protestants, it nonetheless represents their interpretation that immortality is only possible through Christ. This doctrine supports the teaching of the resurrection and thus it is a very important part of the Adventist eschatological model.

=== Health reform ===
Ellen White expounded greatly on the subject of health and nutrition, as well as healthy eating and a balanced diet. At her behest, the Seventh-day Adventist Church first established the Western Health Reform Institute in Battle Creek, Michigan in 1866 to care for the sick as well as to disseminate health instruction. Over the years, other Adventist sanitariums were established around the country. These sanitariums evolved into hospitals, forming the backbone of the Adventists' medical network and, in 1972, forming the Adventist Health System.

The beginnings of this health ministry are found in a vision that White had in 1863. The vision was said to have occurred during a visit by James and Ellen White to Otsego, Michigan to encourage the evangelistic workers there. As the group bowed in prayer at the beginning of Sabbath, Ellen White reportedly had a vision of the relation of physical health to spirituality, of the importance of following right principles in diet and in the care of the body, and of the benefits of nature's remedies—clean air, sunshine, exercise and pure water. Previous to this vision, little thought or time had been given to health matters in the church, and several of the overtaxed ministers had been forced to become inactive because of sickness. This revelation on June 6, 1863, impressed upon the leaders in the newly organized church the importance of health reform. In the months that followed, as the health message was seen to be a part of the message of Seventh-day Adventists, a health educational program was inaugurated. An introductory step in this effort was the publishing of six pamphlets of 64 pages each, entitled, Health, or How to Live, compiled by James and Ellen White. An article from White was included in each of the pamphlets. The importance of health reform was greatly impressed upon the early leaders of the church through the untimely death of Henry White at the age of 16, the severe illness of Elder James White, which forced him to cease work for three years, and through the sufferings of several other ministers.

Early in 1866, responding to the instruction given to Ellen White on Christmas Day in 1865 that Seventh-day Adventists should establish a health institute for the care of the sick and the imparting of health instruction, plans were laid for the Western Health Reform Institute, which opened in September, 1866. While the Whites were in and out of Battle Creek from 1865 to 1868, James White's poor physical condition led them to move to a small farm near Greenville, Michigan.

White's idea of health reform included vegetarianism in a day and age where "meat and two vegetables" was the standard meal for a typical North American. Her health message inspired a health food revolution starting with John Harvey Kellogg in his creation of Corn Flakes. The Sanitarium Health Food Company as it is now known was also started by this health principle. It is also based on White's health principles that Kellogg differed from his brother's views on the sugar content of their Corn Flake breakfast cereal. The latter started Kellogg Company. White championed a vegetarianism that was intended to be spiritually helpful and with regard to the moral issues of the cruel treatment of animals.

Her views are expressed in many of her writings such as Important Facts Of Faith: Laws Of Health, And Testimonies, Nos. 1-10 (1864), Healthful Living (1897, 1898), The Ministry of Healing (1905), The Health Food Ministry (1970), and Counsels on Diet and Foods (1926).

== See also ==
- Inspiration of Ellen G. White
- List of Ellen White writings
- Ellen G. White Estate
- Prophecy in the Seventh-day Adventist Church
- Seventh-day Adventist Church
- Seventh-day Adventist theology
- 28 Fundamental Beliefs
- The Pillars of Adventism
- History of the Seventh-day Adventist Church
- Millerism
- William Miller (preacher)
- Adventist studies
- List of Seventh-day Adventist hospitals
- List of Seventh-day Adventist medical schools
- List of Seventh-day Adventist secondary schools
- List of Seventh-day Adventist colleges and universities
- Ellen G. White
- Teachings of Ellen G. White
- Ellen G. White Estate
- Seventh-day Adventist interfaith relations
- Second coming
- Premillennialism
- Investigative judgment
- Seventh-day Adventist eschatology
- Sabbath in seventh-day churches
- Sabbath in Christianity
- Seventh-day Adventist worship
