= Annie R. Smith =

American poet

Annie Rebekah Smith
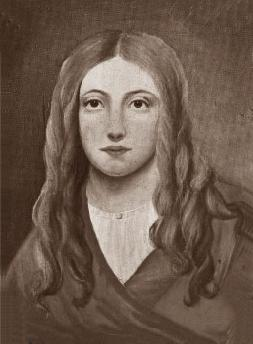
- A portrait by Annie Rebekah Smith believed to be a self-portrait
- Born: March 16, 1828; West Wilton, New Hampshire
- Died: July 26, 1855 (aged 27); West Wilton, New Hampshire
- Occupations: Poet and writer
- Spouse: single

Annie Rebekah Smith (March 16, 1828 – July 26, 1855) was an early American Seventh-day Adventist hymnist, and sister of the Adventist pioneer Uriah Smith.

She has three hymns in the current (6,8,&9 below), and had 10 hymns in the previous Seventh-day Adventist Church Hymnal.

== Biography ==
Annie Rebekah Smith was the third child of four children and only daughter of Samuel and Rebekah (Spalding) Smith. She was born in West Wilton, New Hampshire, on Sunday March 16, 1828. At ten years of age, she accepted Jesus as her Saviour.

=== Millerite Adventist ===
In 1844, she embraced the doctrine of the soon coming of Christ. At sixteen years of age, she experienced the Great Disappointment of October 22, 1844. Afterwards, she lost interest in the Adventist teachings and pursued her favorite occupations of studying and teaching.

=== Education in Boston ===
Between 1844 and 1855 she taught in seven district schools. At the same time she furthered her own education in various schools including six terms at the Ladies' Female Seminary in Charlestown, Massachusetts, near Boston. At the Charlestown Seminary she trained to be a teacher in Oil Painting and French.

=== Annie meets Joseph Bates ===
Sabbatarian Adventist pioneer Joseph Bates met with Annie's mother. He was going to Boston and encouraged her to get Annie to attend the meeting he was conducting there. She went to the meeting and met Bates. This sparked her interest in the sabbatarian Adventist movement.

=== Working for the Review and Herald ===
Subsequent to having written and submitted a poem to the Review and Herald, she was recognised by James White as a talented writer. Although her eyesight was not sufficient to work as a copy-editor, she accepted the position. Upon arriving in Saratoga Springs, New York, she was healed through "anointing and prayer"

During the three and a half years before her death, she contributed around 45 articles to the Review and Herald and to the Youth's Instructor. She also wrote how far from home

=== Annie and John ===
John Nevins Andrews worked at the Review office during this time. A romance developed between them. Her romance with young Andrews failed to end in marriage, with Andrews instead choosing Angeline Stevens to be his wife. The failure of Andrews to follow through with the marriage prompted Ellen White to write that "Annie's disappointment cost her life."

=== Tuberculosis ===
Annie contracted tuberculosis and returned home. She died from the disease on Thursday July 26, 1855, at her family's home in West Wilton, New Hampshire.

== Hymns and poetry ==
Some of the hymns she authored include:

- Awake, O, awake, now to life and duty
- Be patient, be patient, no longer despairing
- Blessed Jesus, meek and lowly
- Hail, peaceful day, divinely blest
- He sleeps in Jesus, peaceful rest
- How Far from Home?
- I ask not, Lord, for less to bear, Here in the narrow
- I Saw One Weary
- Long upon the Mountains
- She hath passed death's chilling billow
- This groaning earth is too dark and drear
- Through this dark valley of conflict
- Toil on a little longer here, For thy reward
- Twas a doleful night on Calvary's height
- Weeping endures but for a night
- When darkness gathers round thy way

== See also ==
- Seventh-day Adventist Church
- Seventh-day Adventist theology
- Seventh-day Adventist eschatology
- History of the Seventh-day Adventist Church
- Ellen G. White
- Adventist
- Seventh-day Adventist Church Pioneers
- Seventh-day Adventist worship
