= J.E.W. =

J.E.W. may refer to:

- Jimmy Eat World, American rock band
- Jimmy Eat World (EP), 1998; by the band 'Jimmy Eat World'
- Bleed American (2001 album), which was later re-titled Jimmy Eat World (2001-2008); by the band 'Jimmy Eat World'
- J. E. White Publishing Company, publishing company founded by James Edson White

== See also ==
- Jimmy Eat World (disambiguation)
- Jew (disambiguation)
