= John Byington =

American Seventh-day Adventist minister (1798–1887)

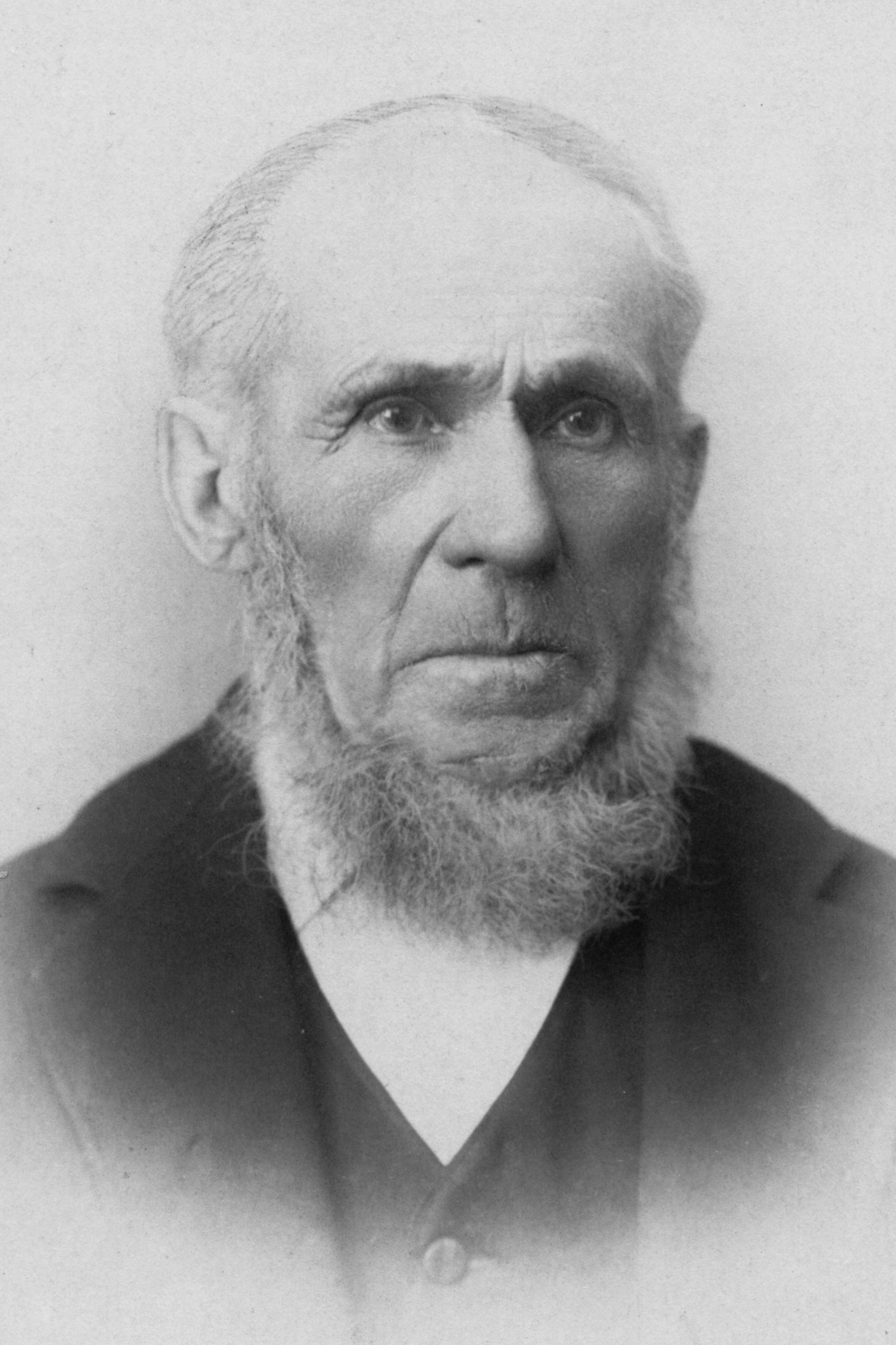
- John Byington
- Born: October 8, 1798; Hinesburg, Vermont, US
- Died: January 7, 1887 (aged 88)
- Known for: First president of the General Conference of the Seventh-day Adventist Church

John Byington (1798–1887) was an American Seventh-day Adventist minister who served as the first president of the General Conference of Seventh-day Adventists from 1863 to 1865.

== Biography ==
Byington's father, Justus, was a soldier in the American Revolutionary War, an itinerant Methodist Episcopal preacher, and later one of the founders of the Methodist Protestant Church, becoming an early president of its Vermont Conference. At 7 years of age John first came under the conviction of sin, and at 18 (1816) was converted. He became active in Methodist laity work, but at 21 years of age his health failed, and for three years he suffered depression. He returned to work dividing his time between farming and preaching.

Byington was active in the antislavery movement and when the leadership of the Methodist Episcopal Church opposed abolitionism, he withdrew from that denomination and joined the new antislavery Wesleyan Methodist Connection. He helped to erect a church and parsonage that are still standing at Morely, New York. He went as a lay delegate to the Wesleyan organizational General Conference meeting in Cleveland, Ohio, in 1844; and later became a Wesleyan minister pastoring the church at Lisbon, New York. He regularly entertained Native Americans and fugitive slaves in his home (his home was reputed to be a stop on the "Underground Railroad" at Buck's Bridge, New York, where he lived on a farm).

In 1844 he heard a Millerite sermon in Cleveland, Ohio, but was not overly impressed. In 1852, upon reading a copy of the Review and Herald (now the Adventist Review) he began to keep the seventh-day Sabbath. Shortly afterward James and Ellen White visited his home at Buck's Bridge. For three years he conducted Sabbath meetings in his home, then he erected and owned a church building on his property. This is reputed to have been the first Seventh-day Adventist-built church. In a nearby home his daughter, Martha (George Washington Amadon) taught what is thought to be the first Adventist elementary school (1853).

At the request of James White, Byington relocated to Battle Creek, Michigan in 1858. He worked closely with James White and J. N. Andrews in helping to plan for the growing Sabbatarian Adventist movement. In 1863 at the initial organization of the General Conference in Battle Creek, Michigan, he became the denomination's first president - an office he held for two one-year terms. James White, who was elected first, declined the position.

Preceded by (Founding President)	President of the General Conference of Seventh-day Adventists; 1863–1865	Succeeded by James Springer White
