= George Ide Butler =

American minister (1834–1918)

- President of the General Conference of Seventh-day Adventists
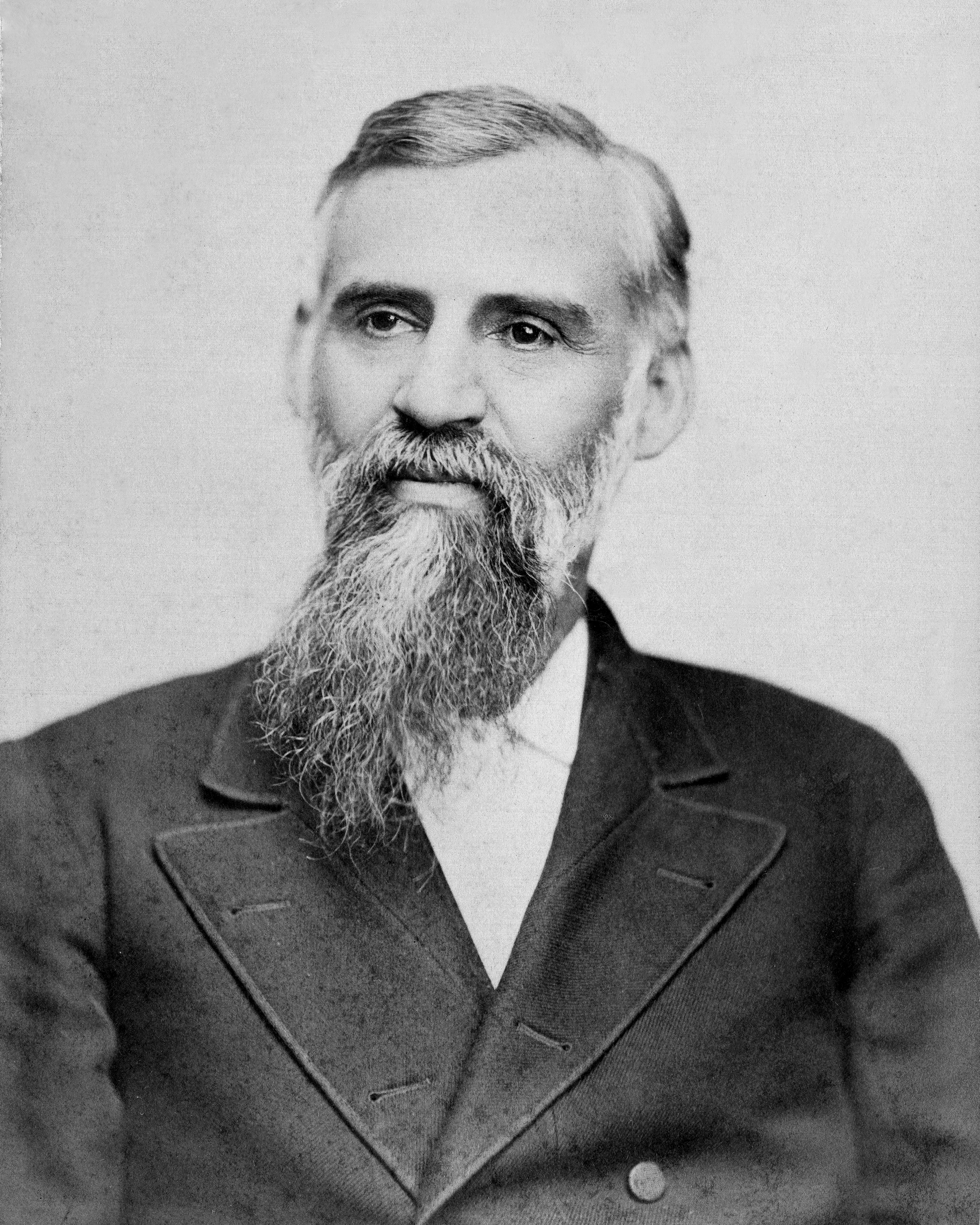
- Church: Seventh-day Adventist Church
- In office: 1871–1874; 1880–1888
- Predecessor: James Springer White
- Successor: James Springer White; Ole Andres Olsen
- Other post: President of the Iowa-Nebraska Conference (1876-1877)

Orders
- Ordination: October 1867

Personal details
- Born: November 12, 1834 Waterbury, Vermont, U.S.
- Died: July 25, 1918 (aged 83) Healdsburg, California, U.S.
- Buried: Bowling Green, Florida, U.S.
- Spouse: Lentha Lockwood (m. 1859; died 1901) Elizabeth Work Grainger (m. 1907)
- Children: 3
- Relatives: Ezra Butler (grandfather)

George Ide Butler (1834–1918) was a Seventh-day Adventist minister, administrator, and author. Originally from Vermont, United States, Butler's parents were closely involved in the beginnings of the Seventh-day Adventist Church. In 1853 his family moved to Iowa where he was converted at age 22 and baptized by J. N. Andrews. He then settled on a farm and taught school during the winter months. On March 10, 1859, he married Lentha Lockwood (1826-1901). They afterward settled near Waukon, Iowa, where Butler resumed teaching.

In 1865, after issues in the Iowa Constituency meeting and subsequent resignation of its leaders, Snook and Brinkerhoff, Butler was elected Iowa Conference president. In June 1867 Butler was given a ministerial license, and in October was ordained. He worked indefatigably as an evangelist, bringing unity to the previously fragmented conference. As a result of his rebuttals to the Marion party, which focused their dissent upon the ministry of Ellen G. White, Butler became one of the foremost apologists to defend her during the 1860s and 1870s.

In 1872, due to the failing health of James White, Butler was elected president of the General Conference. Butler was active in raising funds to start Battle Creek College (now Andrews University), and to establish the Pacific Press in Oakland, California. In August 1874 Butler resigned as president and James White, now sufficiently recovered, took back the reins of leadership.

Butler returned to Iowa where at the next session of the Iowa-Nebraska Conference he was elected president (1876-1877). He started a vigorous evangelistic program, but when James White's health began to falter a second time, Butler was once again elected General Conference president. By October 1880 he had returned as General Conference president frequently counseling with Ellen White. In 1882 he also became president of the Seventh-day Adventist Publishing Association. In 1886, he became entangled in a theological tangle with E. J. Waggoner over whether the law in the book of Galatians was the ceremonial or moral law. He also confronted the apostasy of D. M. Canright. By the time of the famous 1888 General Conference Session Butler called for those who were sympathetic to him to "stand by the old landmarks" or to not give up what he considered to be traditional theological positions. This called forth a strong rebuke from Ellen G. White.

Soon after the 1888 session, Butler's health collapsed. The Butlers purchased a rural farm in Florida which they called "Twin Magnolias" and where they could raise citrus fruit and recuperate. However, the following year Lentha suffered a debilitating stroke. Some propose that Butler later repented for the wrong course he had followed at the 1888 General Conference session.

In 1901 Lentha died and George was elected the first president of the Florida Conference. The following year Butler became the first president of the Southern Union Conference and the Southern Publishing Association. In 1902 Ellen White wrote of him: "We welcome him into our ranks once more, and regard him as one of our most valuable laborers." {20MR 220.4} In 1907 Butler married Elizabeth Work Grainger, whose husband had died in the mission field, and the next year they retired a second time. He died July 25, 1918, of cancer.

The standard biography of G. I. Butler is E. K. Vande Vere, Rugged Heart (Southern Publishing Association, 1979).

== See also ==
- General Conference of Seventh-day Adventists
- Seventh-day Adventist Church
- Seventh-day Adventist theology
- Seventh-day Adventist eschatology
- History of the Seventh-day Adventist Church

Preceded by James Springer White	President of the General Conference of Seventh-day Adventists; 1871 - 1874	Succeeded by James Springer White
Preceded by James Springer White	President of the General Conference of Seventh-day Adventists; 1880 - 1888	Succeeded by Ole Andres Olsen
