= Uriah Smith =

American minister and author (1832–1903)

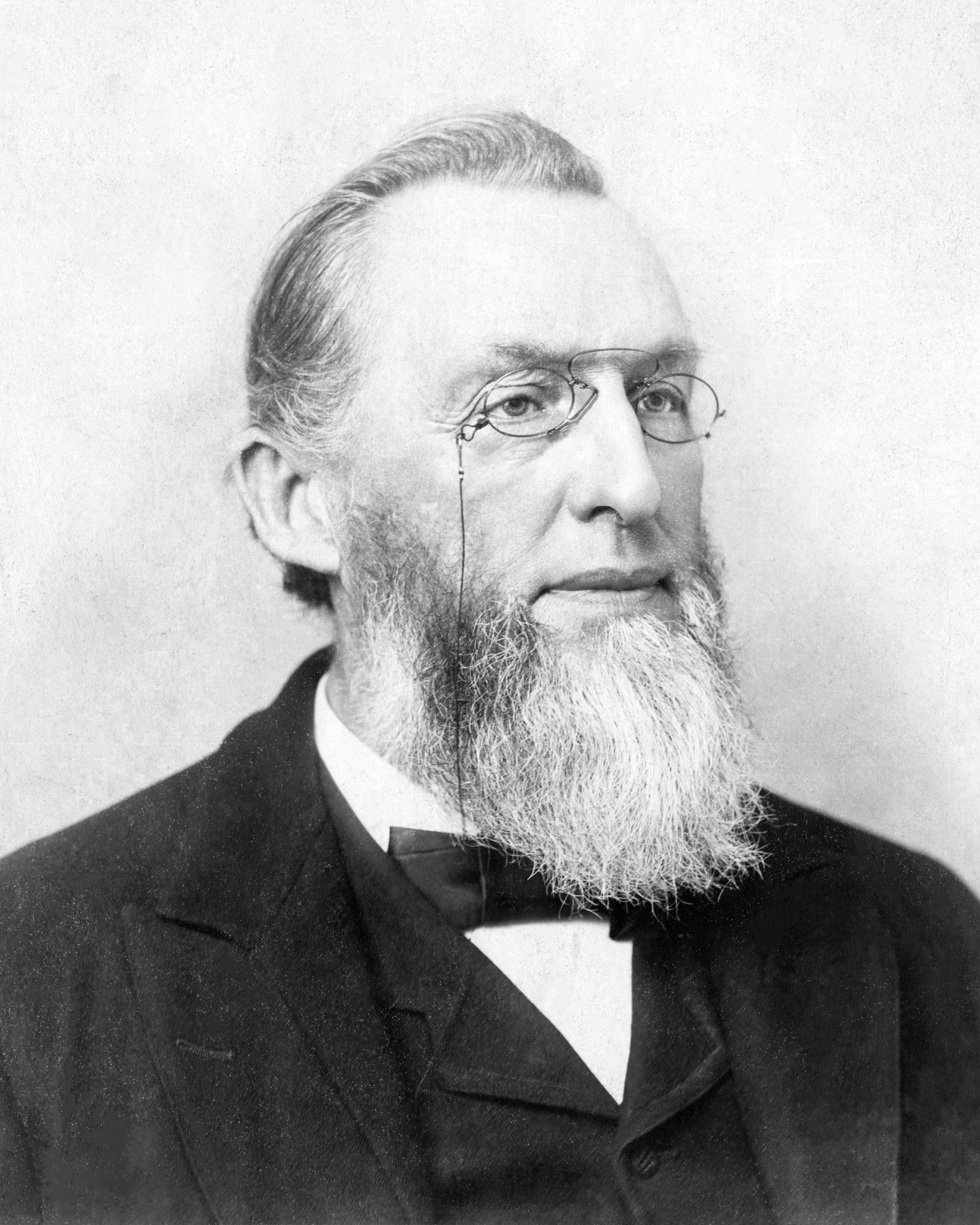
- Smith c. 1880 to 1889
- Born: May 3, 1832; Wilton, New Hampshire
- Died: March 6, 1903 (aged 70); Battle Creek, Michigan
- Occupations: Author, Inventor and Editor of Review and Herald of the Seventh-day Adventist Church
- Notable work: Daniel and the Revelation
- Spouse: Harriet Newell Stevens Smith

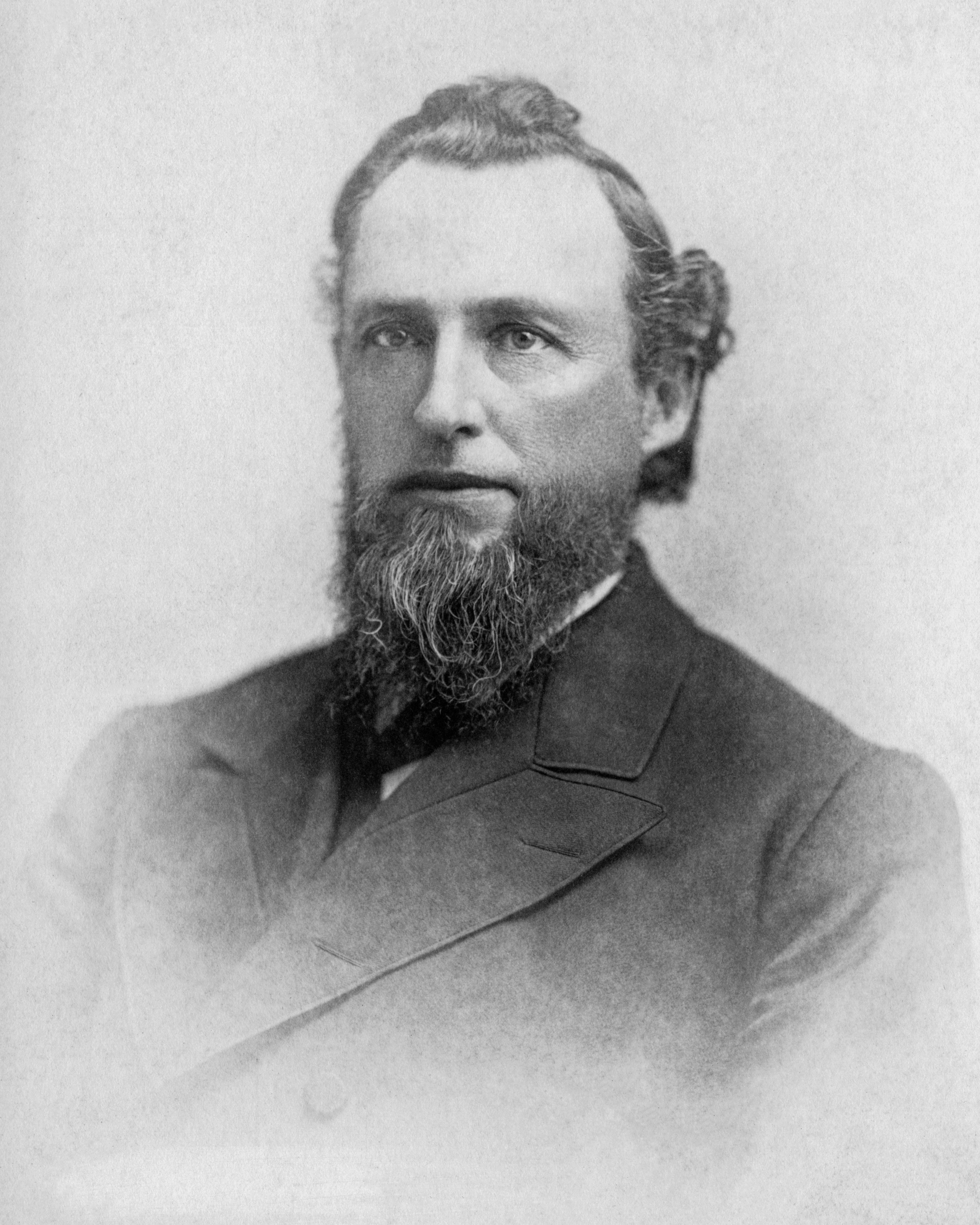
Portrait of Smith c. 1870s

Uriah Smith (May 3, 1832 – March 6, 1903) was a Seventh-day Adventist author, minister, educator, and theologian who is best known as the longest serving editor of the Review and Herald (now the Adventist Review) for over 50 years.

Some of Smith's lesser-known contributions include his work as a poet, hymn writer, inventor, and engraver. He patented an idea for an early automobile, called Horsey Horseless, which had a fake horse head attached to the front, intended to stop horses from being frightened by the car. He also patented an artificial leg with a moveable ankle, a school desk with an improved folding seat and several other inventions and improvements. At the time of the formation of the General Conference of Seventh-day Adventists in 1863, Smith was elected as the first secretary. He later held this same position again five separate times. He also served a term (1876–77) as General Conference treasurer.

Ordained to the gospel ministry in 1874, in that same year he also helped co-found Battle Creek College. As a theologian in residence at church headquarters he regularly taught Bible classes, and ministerial workshops, and chaired the college board.

As the author of numerous books, Smith carved some of the first woodcut illustrations published by early Sabbatarian Adventists. He was one of the most prolific authors of early Adventism. His best-known work is Thoughts on Daniel and the Revelation often abbreviated simply as Daniel and the Revelation. It became the classic text on Adventist end-time beliefs.

His older sister Annie R. Smith was an early Seventh-day Adventist poet and hymnist.

== Early life ==
Uriah Smith was born in 1832 in West Wilton, New Hampshire. His family accepted the Millerite message and in 1844 experienced what has become known as the Great Disappointment. That same year, Smith had his left leg amputated due to an infection. Following the Disappointment, Smith lost interest in religion and commenced schooling at Phillips Exeter Academy in Exeter, New Hampshire. In December 1852, he accepted the message taught by Sabbatarian Adventists which in 1863 became the Seventh-day Adventist Church. In 1853, he began working at the offices of the Advent Review and Sabbath Herald (now the Adventist Review), becoming its editor in 1855. His main contribution to Adventist theology was a commentary on the prophetic Biblical books of Daniel and the Revelation, but he also wrote extensively on conditional immortality and other topics. He advocated religious liberty, the abolition of slavery, and noncombatancy for Adventists.

== Relationship to Ellen White ==
While SDA Ellen White wrote many things saying how she "loved Brother Smith next to my own husband and children because he has had a part in the work for so many years.", she also had many warnings for him. In 1869 she wrote: "I had no rest in spirit in the house of Brother Uriah. I have left the house saying to myself, “It is a godless house. I have seen no less than four evil angels controlling family members". And in the same letter: "We do not expect you will have any more light nor as much as you have had. We cannot trust you."

In 1883 he was one member of five people who was appointed the task of removing the grammatical imperfections in the writings of Ellen White.

Along with General Conference president, Elder Butler, Uriah Smith was one of the two top figures in the Seventh-day Adventist Church to reject the message of Righteousness by Faith, brought by Jones and Waggoner to the General Conference session Minneapolis in 1888. "The result of your (Uriah Smith's) course, and your working on the same line since you left Minneapolis, has made the carrying out of the work given me of God to do fiftyfold harder than needed have been. You have barred my way,"

He repented in 1891, saying: “Sister White, will you forgive me for all the trouble and distress that I have caused you? This is the last time if the Lord will pardon me. I will not repeat the history of the past three years.” Ellen White rejoiced at this.

In 1899 Ellen White endorsed Uriah Smith's book Thoughts on Daniel and the Revelation, alongside two of her own, saying: "We will stand together, Brother Smith. Of all the books that have come forth from the press, those mentioned are of the greatest consequence in the past and at the present time. I know that “Thoughts on Daniel and the Revelation” has done great work in this country."

== Death of Uriah Smith ==
He died in Battle Creek, Michigan, in 1903, at the age of 70, from a stroke on his way to the Review office. He is buried in Oak Hill Cemetery, Battle Creek, Michigan.

== Selected publications ==
- The Warning Voice of Time and Prophecy (1853)
- The Bible Student's Assistant, Or, A Compend Of Scripture References (1858)
- Mortal or Immortal? Which?, or, An Inquiry into the Present Constitution and Future Condition of Man (1860)
- The Two Covenants (1860s)
- Which? Mortal, Or Immortal? : Or, An Inquiry Into The Present Constitution And Future Condition Of Man (1864)
- Thoughts on Daniel, Critical and Practical, on the Book of Daniel 2nd edn (DjVu format)
- An Appeal to the Youth: Funeral Address of Henry N. White (1868)
- The Visions of Mrs. E. G. White: a Manifestation of Spiritual Gifts According to the Scriptures (1868)
- Poems with Rebekah Smith and Annie R. Smith (1871)
- The United States in the Light of Prophecy, or, An Exposition of Rev. 13:11-17 (1872)
- The State of the Dead and the Destiny of the Wicked (1873)
- The Sanctuary And The Twenty-Three Hundred Days Of Daniel VIII, 14 (1877)
- The Biblical Institute with James White (1878)
- A Sketch of the Last Sickness and Death of Elder James White with W. C. Gage and John Harvey Kellogg (1881)
- Man's Nature And Destiny, or, The State Of The Dead, The Reward Of The Righteous, And The End Of The Wicked (1884)
- Our Country's Future. The United States in the Light Of Prophecy, or, an Exposition of Rev. 13:11-17 (1884)
- Synopsis of the Present Truth: A Brief Exposition of the Views of S. D. Adventists (1884)
- An Exposure of Fanaticism and Wickedness with George Ide Butler(1885)
- The Marvel of Nations. Our Country: Its Past, Present, and Future, and What the Scriptures Say of It (1886)
- Modern Spiritualism: a Subject of Prophecy and a Sign of the Times (1896)
- Here and Hereafter, or, Man in Life and Death (1897)
- Daniel and the Revelation (1897)
- Looking Unto Jesus, or, Christ in Type and Antitype (1897)
- Our Country, the Marvel of Nations (1901)

| Preceded by James White | Editor of the Adventist Review; 1855–1861 | Succeeded by James White |
| Preceded by James White | Editor of the Adventist Review; 1864–1869 | Succeeded by J. N. Andrews |
| Preceded by J. N. Andrews | Editor of the Adventist Review; 1870–1871 | Succeeded by James White |
| Preceded by James White | Editor of the Adventist Review; 1872–1873 | Succeeded by James White |
| Preceded by James White | Editor of the Adventist Review; 1877–1880 | Succeeded by James White |
| Preceded by James White | Editor of the Adventist Review; 1881–1897 | Succeeded by A. T. Jones |
| Preceded by A. T. Jones | Editor of the Adventist Review; 1901–1903 | Succeeded by W. W. Prescott |
