= Horsey Horseless =

Proposed automobile design

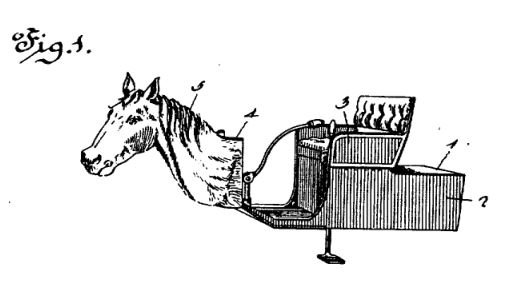
Patent diagram of Horsey Horseless

The Horsey Horseless was an early automobile invented in 1899 by Uriah Smith, a Seventh-day Adventist preacher in Battle Creek, Michigan. A wooden horse head and neck were attached to the front to make Horsey Horseless resemble a horse and carriage, as this was believed to prevent horses on the road from being frightened. The horse head was hollow, and also served as the fuel tank. It is unknown whether or not Horsey Horseless was ever built. It was included in Time Magazine's 2007 list of "The 50 Worst Cars of All Time".

== Description ==
In his patent, Smith described the Horsey Horseless as a “new and original design for a vehicle body” intended to be “both useful and ornamental.” Smith explained in the patent: “The live horse would be thinking of another horse, and before he could discover his error and see that he had been fooled, the strange carriage would have passed, and it would then be too late to grow frantic and fractious.” Modern horse experts have noted that horses rely heavily on smell to identify each other, and that most would not mistake an automobile’s horse-shaped appendage for an actual horse.

In the late 1890s, resistance to the novel horseless carriages in the United States and Europe was partially due to their effect on horses. In an era when horse-drawn transport was common in city streets, the loud engines and high speed of automobiles could terrify horses and, in some cases, cause them to bolt.

== See also ==
- Skeuomorph, a derivative object that retains ornamental design cues from structures that were necessary in the original
