= Jimmy Eat World (disambiguation) =

Jimmy Eat World is an American rock band. It is also the name of three releases by the band:

- Jimmy Eat World (1994 album) by the band Jimmy Eat World
- Bleed American (2001 album; later retitled Jimmy Eat World (2001–2008)) by the band Jimmy Eat World
- Jimmy Eat World (EP) (1998) by the band Jimmy Eat World

== See also ==
- A number of singles by 'Jimmy Eat World'; see Jimmy Eat World discography
