= Joseph Bates (Adventist) =

Co-founder of the Seventh-day Adventist Church

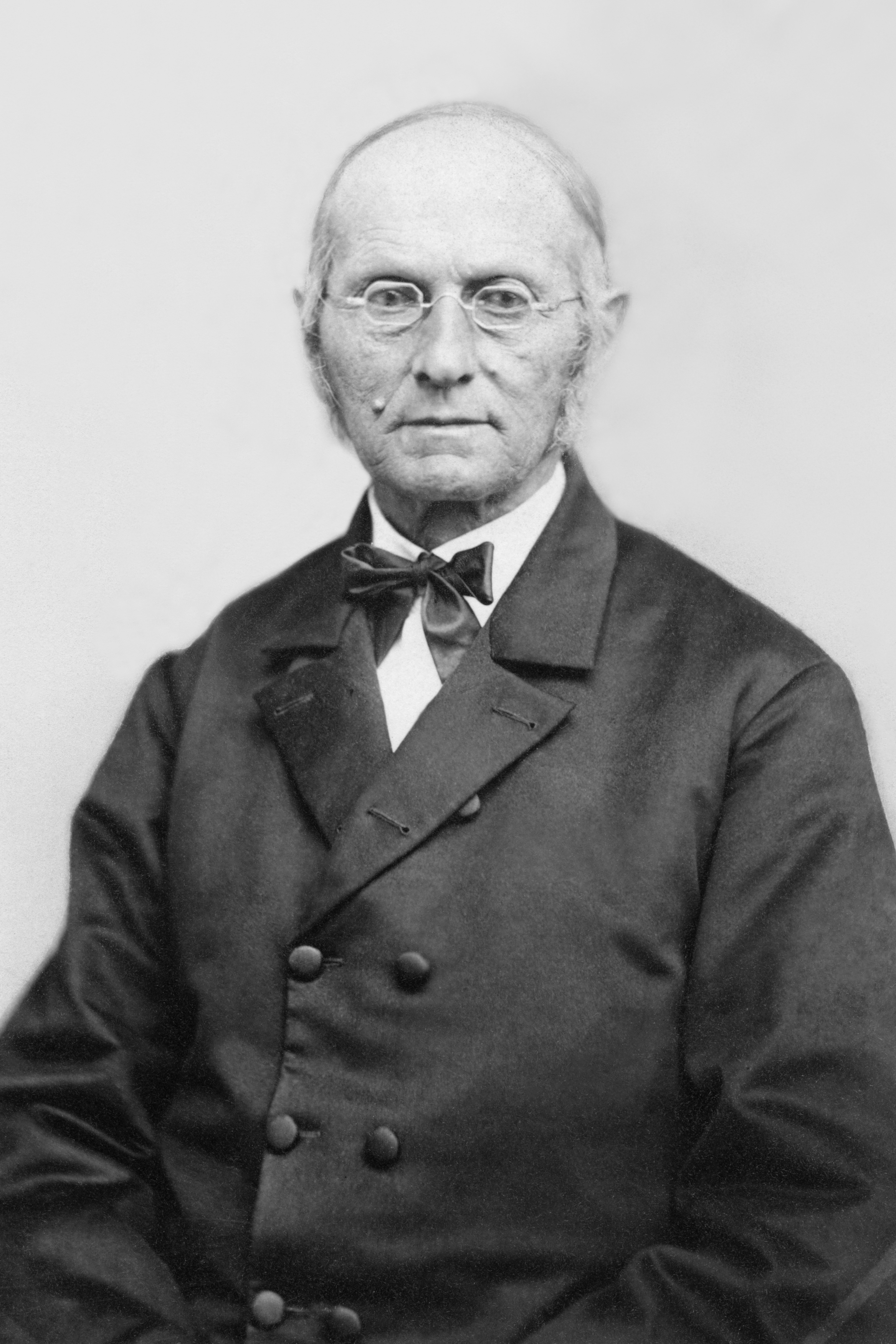
- Bates c. 1865

Personal details
- Born: July 8, 1792 Rochester, Massachusetts, US
- Died: March 19, 1872 (aged 79) Battle Creek, Michigan, US
- Occupation: Pastor, sailor, author, teacher

Joseph Bates (8 July 1792 – 19 March 1872) was an American seaman and revivalist minister. He was a co-founder and developer of Sabbatarian Adventism, whose followers would later establish the Seventh-day Adventist Church. Bates is also credited with convincing James White and Ellen G. White of the validity of the seventh-day Sabbath.

== Life and work ==
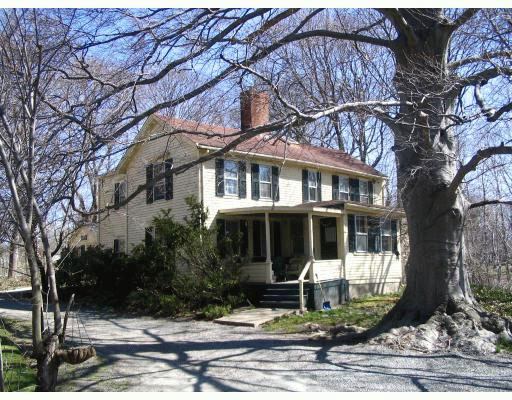
Home of Joseph Bates, photographed in 2005

Joseph Bates was born in Rochester, Massachusetts on July 8, 1792. His father, also named Joseph, was a volunteer in the Revolutionary War and his mother was the daughter of Barnabas Nye of Sandwich, Massachusetts. In 1793, Bates' family moved to the part of New Bedford, Massachusetts that would become the township of Fairhaven in 1812. In June 1807, Bates sailed as a cabin boy on the new ship commanded by Elias Terry, called the Fanny, to London via New York City. This was the commencement of Bates' sailing career. In 1811, Bates was forced into servitude for the British navy and spent time as a prisoner during the War of 1812. After his release he continued his career, eventually becoming captain of a ship. During one of his voyages, he read a copy of the Bible that his wife packed for him. He experienced conversion and became involved in a variety of reforms, including helping to found an early temperance society. Bates became disturbed by the way the sailors (regardless of their religion) were forced to go to Anglican services; later in life he became adamant that the separation of church and state should be upheld. He also was a strong supporter of abolition. In his everyday life as a sailor, he noticed the intemperance of the sailors and the resulting side effects. Many of these problems came from poor rations, but many more were the result of overindulgence by the men. He became one of the champions of health reform; abstaining from all alcohol, tobacco, and caffeine, even becoming a vegetarian. In 1839 he accepted the teachings of William Miller that Jesus was coming soon.

After October 22, 1844, like many other Millerites, Bates sought meaning out of the Great Disappointment. During the spring of 1845, Bates accepted the seventh-day Sabbath after reading a pamphlet by T. M. Preble. Bates soon became known as the "apostle of the Sabbath" and wrote several booklets on the topic. One of the first, published in 1846, was entitled The Seventh Day Sabbath, a Perpetual Sign. One of Bates' most significant contributions was his ability to connect theologically the Sabbath with a unique understanding of the heavenly sanctuary. This apocalyptic understanding of theology would become known as the Great Controversy theme.

Bates initially was skeptical of the young Ellen G. White and her prophetic gift, but became convinced of its truthfulness when he was in the presence of Ellen White when she had a vision of several planets. He contributed to early publications such as A Word to the "Little Flock." Bates was active with the Whites in participating in a series of Bible Conferences held in 1848 to 1850 that has become known as the Sabbath and Sanctuary Conferences. During the 1850s Bates supported the development of a more formal church organization that culminated in 1863 with the formation of the Seventh-day Adventist Church. Ellen White rebuked the leaders of the Battle Creek church in 1866 for not having confidence in James White, and Bates is one of those who signed his name to a statement regarding this saying: "'We now accept with deep sorrow of heart the reproof given us in this testimony,'" Testimony for the Church No.13

His tendency to go to extremes was checked by cautions from Ellen White. "I saw that the above named errors of Brother Bates (his position on helping the poor; praying for the sick before unbelievers) and others more dangerous brought confusion and had destroyed James's confidence in Brother Bates;" Manuscript 14, 1850 But in the Advent Review of Dec. 11, 1879, Ellen White promotes Joseph Bates autobiography with these words: "For young people, the Life of Joseph Bates is a treasure;...". He expressed his displeasure at Ellen White for rebuking him in his too extreme diet just one month before he died.

Joseph Bates died on March 19, 1872, in Battle Creek, Michigan. He is buried in Poplar Hill Cemetery in Monterey, Michigan.

Bates' family home at 191 Main St., Fairhaven, MA was purchased by Adventist Heritage and is being restored as a heritage attraction.

== Health reform ==
Bates was the first temperance advocate and vegetarian Adventist. By 1844, Bates had given up all forms of alcohol, tea, coffee, meat, tobacco and "greasy and rich foods." Later Seventh-day Adventists were influenced by Bates' health principles and by the 1860s Adventist publications discouraged the use of alcohol, coffee and tea.

== Bibliography ==
The best primary resource is Joseph Bates, Autobiography (Battle Creek: Battle Creek Steam Press, 1868) and republished and annotated in 2004 by Andrews University Press. Other helpful treatments include Virgil E. Robinson, Cabin Boy to Advent Crusader (Southern Publishing Association, 1960), which was a popular treatment intended primarily for a youth audience; G. T. Anderson, Outrider of the Apocalypse: Life and Times of Joseph Bates (Review and Herald, 1972); and George R. Knight, Joseph Bates: The Real Founder of Seventh-day Adventism (Review and Herald, 2004).

Some of Bates' publications include:

- The Opening Heavens Or, A Connected View of the Testimony of the Prophets and Apostles (1846)
- The Seventh Day Sabbath: A Perpetual Sign from the Beginning to the Entering Into the Gates (1846, revised edition 1847)
- Second Advent Way Marks and High Heaps (1847)
- A Word to the "Little Flock" (1847, with James and Ellen White)
- A Vindication of the Seventh-Day Sabbath and the Commandments of God (1848)
- A Seal of the Living God (1849)
- An Explanation of the Typical and Anti-Typical Sanctuary (1850)
- The Autobiography of Elder Joseph Bates (1868)

== See also ==
- Seventh-day Adventist Church
- Seventh-day Adventist theology
