= D. M. Canright =

Seventh-day Adventist leader (1840–1919)

- Born: September 22, 1840; Kinderhook, Michigan
- Died: May 12, 1919 (aged 78)
- Occupation: Pastor
- Known for: One of the church's severest critics
- Spouse: Lucretia Cranson
- Children: 7
- Parent(s): Hiram and Loretta Canright
- Religion: Christian
- Church: Seventh-day Adventist Church
- Ordained: 1865
- Offices held: President of the Sabbath School Association of the Seventh-day Adventist Church

Dudley Marvin Canright (September 22, 1840 – May 12, 1919) was a pastor in the Seventh-day Adventist Church for 22 years, who later left the church and became one of its severest critics. He joined the church in 1859, at the age of 19, and rose through the ministry to a position of prominence on the General Conference, a committee of Seventh-day Adventist Church leaders.

== Early life ==
Dudley Marvin Canright was born in a farmhouse near Kinderhook, Michigan, on September 22, 1840, to Hiram and Loretta Canright. In 1859, at the age of 19, Dudley journeyed eastwards to attend the Albion Academy, in Albion, New York. To support himself, he worked as a farmhand for Elder Roswell F. Cottrell, a Seventh-day Adventist minister. In the summer of 1859, he attended a camp meeting, held by Elder James White, near Albion. There, he accepted the doctrine of the Advent Message, and was soon baptized into the Seventh-day Adventist Church. Dudley briefly served as secretary to Elder White, who encouraged him to enter the ministry. For 5 years, after converting his entire family to Adventism, Dudley served as an evangelist for the Seventh-day Adventist Church, traveling and preaching across the midwestern U.S. In 1865, at the age of 24, Dudley Canright was ordained by James White and J. N. Loughborough, in a service held at Battle Creek.

Dudley continued his evangelistic career, preaching throughout New England. In 1867, he married Lucretia Cranson, a 19-year-old orphan, partially brought up by Ellen G. White. Mr. and Mrs. Canright had 3 children, 2 of whom survived infancy.

The life of a traveling minister's wife was harsh for Mrs. Canright, and in 1879, she succumbed to tuberculosis. Two years later, Dudley was remarried, to a Miss Lucy Hadden. Their union produced 4 children, 3 of whom survived infancy.

== Estrangement and reconciliation with the Adventist Church ==
For 20 years, Canright was a minister and evangelist for the Seventh-day Adventist Church across the United States. He was also a notable contributor to the Adventist periodical, the Review and Herald (now the Adventist Review). During a vacation in Colorado with James and Ellen White in 1873, Canright and his wife had a falling out with them. Canright and James White reconciled later that year. At the 1876 General Conference Session he was 1 of 3 men elected to the General Conference Executive Committee, the most prestigious committee in the denomination. In 1878, Canright was elected President of the Sabbath School Association of the Seventh-day Adventist Church. His first wife Lucretia died the following year.

Canright was frequently called upon by Elder James White, and other leaders of the Seventh-day Adventist Church, to debate ministers of other denominations, generally on the question of the seventh-day Sabbath:

In 1874 Elder White had arranged to have a big debate held at Napa City, Calif., between Elder Miles Grant, of Boston, Mass., and one of our ministers.

— Seventh-day Adventism Renounced, by D.M. Canright, 1914

From the early 1880s, Canright gradually became disillusioned with what he considered autocratic behavior on the parts of Elder and Mrs. White. In 1880, he retired briefly from the ministry and journeyed through the Midwest, as an elocution teacher and lecturer. After a year of itinerant living, he returned to Battle Creek, Michigan, where he reconciled himself with Elder and Mrs. White.

In a September 13, 1881 article in the Advent Review and Herald, entitled, "Danger of Giving Way to Discouragement and Doubts", Canright wrote:

I came to Battle Creek - and freely talked over with Eld. Butler, Bro. and Sr. White, and others, my difficulties and trials. They did all they could, and all I could ask, to assist me...As I took hold again to labor, and tried to look on the side of courage and faith in the work, I found my difficulties disappearing, and my former interest and confidence in the message reviving, till now I feel clear and satisfied in the work again...If the Bible does not plainly and abundantly teach the doctrines of the third angel's message, then I despair of ever knowing what it does teach...I have no further doubt as to my duty and the work of my life. As for years in the past, so in the future, all that I am and have shall be thrown unreservedly into this work...I humbly trust in the grace of God to help me keep this resolution. One who has not experienced it, can have little idea how rapidly discouragement and doubts will grow upon a person, when once they are given way to. In a short time, everything seems to put on a different color...Of course I regret now that I gave way to discouragements and doubts, but I think I have learned a lesson by it which I shall not need to learn again as long as I live.

== Break with Seventh-day Adventism ==
In 1881, back as a Seventh-day Adventist minister, Canright remarried, and continued his life as a traveling evangelist for another year. Then, in 1882, he retired from the ministry and bought a farm in Otsego, Michigan. Once again, he began to have doubts about the White family, particularly about Ellen White's "gift of prophecy". He wavered repeatedly, several times emerging from his early retirement to hold meetings and preach. Throughout the early 1880s, his relations with Mrs. White remained amicable.

Then, quite abruptly, in 1887, Canright and his wife, Lucy Canright, left the Seventh-day Adventist Church. It was a decision he had been mulling over for a year. In severing his relations with his home church, the Otsego Seventh-day Adventist Church, Canright stated the following, as recorded by the church clerk:

That he had come to a point where he no longer believed that the Ten Commandments were binding upon Christians and had given up the Law, the Sabbath, the Messages, the Sanctuary, our position upon [the] U.S. in prophecy, the Testimonies, health reform, the ordinances of humility. He also said that he did not believe that the Papacy had changed the Sabbath. And though he did not directly state it, his language intimated that he would probably keep Sunday.

He thinks that Seventh-day Adventists are too narrow in their ideas, and that in quoting so much as they do from the Old Testament are going back into the moonlight rather than experiencing the sunlight of the gospel of Christ. He thought we were exalting the law above Christ. Also has no faith in the missionary work as conducted by our people, feels as if it is not the way God designed to do the work.

He still claimed to believe that the coming of Christ was near, making the same application of Daniel 2 and 7 and Matthew 24 that he always had, but did not believe that there was to be any special message preceding Christ's second coming in the sense in which Seventh-day Adventists teach.

— Church clerk's record, February 17, 1887, Otsego, Michigan Seventh-day Adventist Church.

== Life after Adventism ==
Having left the Seventh-day Adventist Church, Dudley and his family briefly considered joining the Methodist Church, but finally settled upon the Baptist Church. On March 5, 1887, he, his wife and their daughter Veva (Genevieve) were accepted into the Otsego Baptist Church. On the 17th he was given a license to preach, and two days later was ordained and made the Church's salaried pastor. He remained in this position until 1889.

In September 1890, Dudley and his family left Otsego, moving to Grand Rapids, Michigan. There, he became Pastor Emeritus of the Berean Baptist Church, an office he held for only a year. During his time as pastor of these churches, he occupied himself in writing his 413-page critique, Seventh-day Adventism Renounced, which was published in 1889. In 1915, he and his brother Jasper attended the funeral of Ellen G. White, during which he reportedly exclaimed, "There is a noble Christian woman gone!"

In March 1916, Canright accompanied an old Adventist friend, J.H. Morrison, to a church workers' meeting in Battle Creek. Afterward, they went to Morrison's house. Following that visit, Canright walked to the local Baptist church, where he had a key to the basement. Unaware that extensive remodeling had taken place, and arriving at the church after dark, Canright fell through an open hole into the basement, broke his leg, and remained there for two days. He was taken to the local hospital, and then to the Battle Creek Sanitarium, where his leg was amputated. He spent the last 3 years of his life with his daughter Genevieve, who had converted to Christian Science. Canright died on May 12, 1919. Two months later, his final book, The Life of Mrs. E.G. White, was published. In it he criticised White heavily and maintained, among other charges:

- that the early doctrines held in 1844 and up to 1851 failed utterly
- that in some cases her prophecies were wrong, and then suppressed afterwards
- that she rebuked and controlled peoples' conduct, purportedly by spiritual knowledge, but factually by informings that often attacked an innocent party
- that she plagiarized many of her purportedly God-inspired texts from other authors, and had to revise one of her books at an expense of $3,000

In 1933, the Review and Herald published In Defense of the Faith: A Reply To Canright. Written by W.H. Branson, an Adventist minister, the book sought to correct what the author alleged were Canright's distortions and misrepresentations of Adventist doctrine. In 1971, the church published I Was Canright's Secretary, by Carrie Johnson, a memoir of her work for D.M. Canright in the early 1900s.
