= James Edson White =

American book publisher (1849–1928)

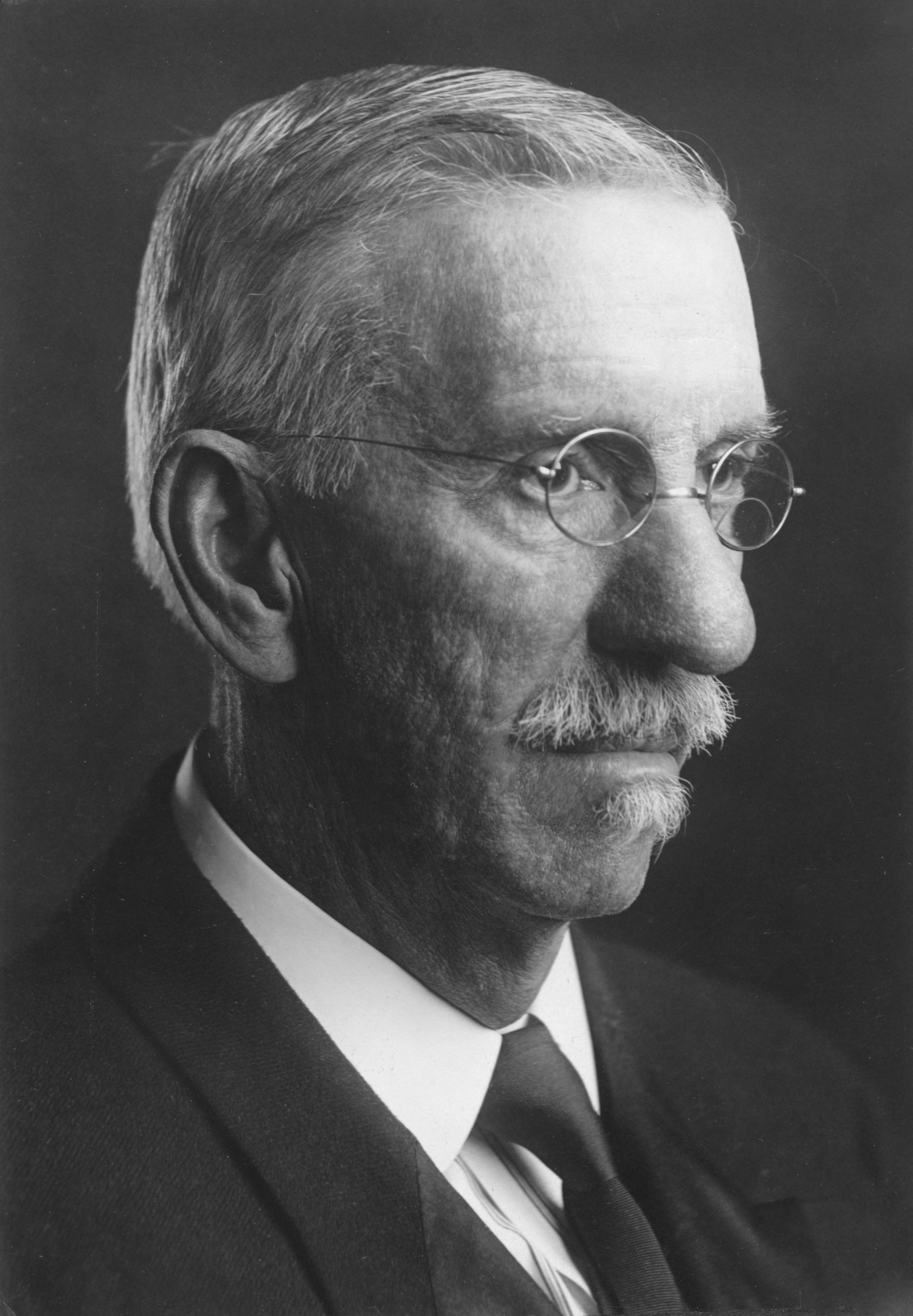
Portrait of James Edson White in 1916.

James Edson White (28 July 1849 – 3 June 1928), frequently known as Edson White, was an American author, publisher and the second son of two of the pioneers of the Seventh-day Adventist Church, James S. White and Ellen G. White.

In 1870 he married Emma McDearmon, but did not have any children. After being detached from his parents and their church for a couple of decades he had a spiritual change of heart when he was 44 years old, at the time he lived in Chicago.

== Mission to African Americans ==
He found a booklet written by his mother titled Our Duty to the Colored People. This encouraged him to set up a mission to spread the Adventist message to African American people in the southern United States. He set up mission schools for black people along the Mississippi River. The first school set up was on a boat called the Morning Star. This boat had a library, a chapel, a photography lab, a print shop, and accommodation for staff. Schools were created at Vicksburg, Mississippi, Yazoo City, Lintonia, and Nashville, Tennessee. The mission built up to 50 schools, building an organization called Southern Missionary Society. This became part of the Adventist Southern Union Conference.

The publishing organization that Edson established was originally known as the "Gospel Herald Publishing Company". It was taken over by the church and renamed to "Southern Publishing Association" in 1901, which subsequently merged with the Review and Herald Publishing Association in 1980.

He started the "J. E. White Publishing Company."

== Books written ==
- Gospel Primer #01 – used to raise money for the mission
- The coming King (1898, 1909, 1933)
- The New Testament primer (1906)
- Best stories from the best book
- The man that rum made: With temperance lessons and stories
- Past, Present and Future, (1909)
