= J. N. Andrews =

American minister and missionary (1829–1883)

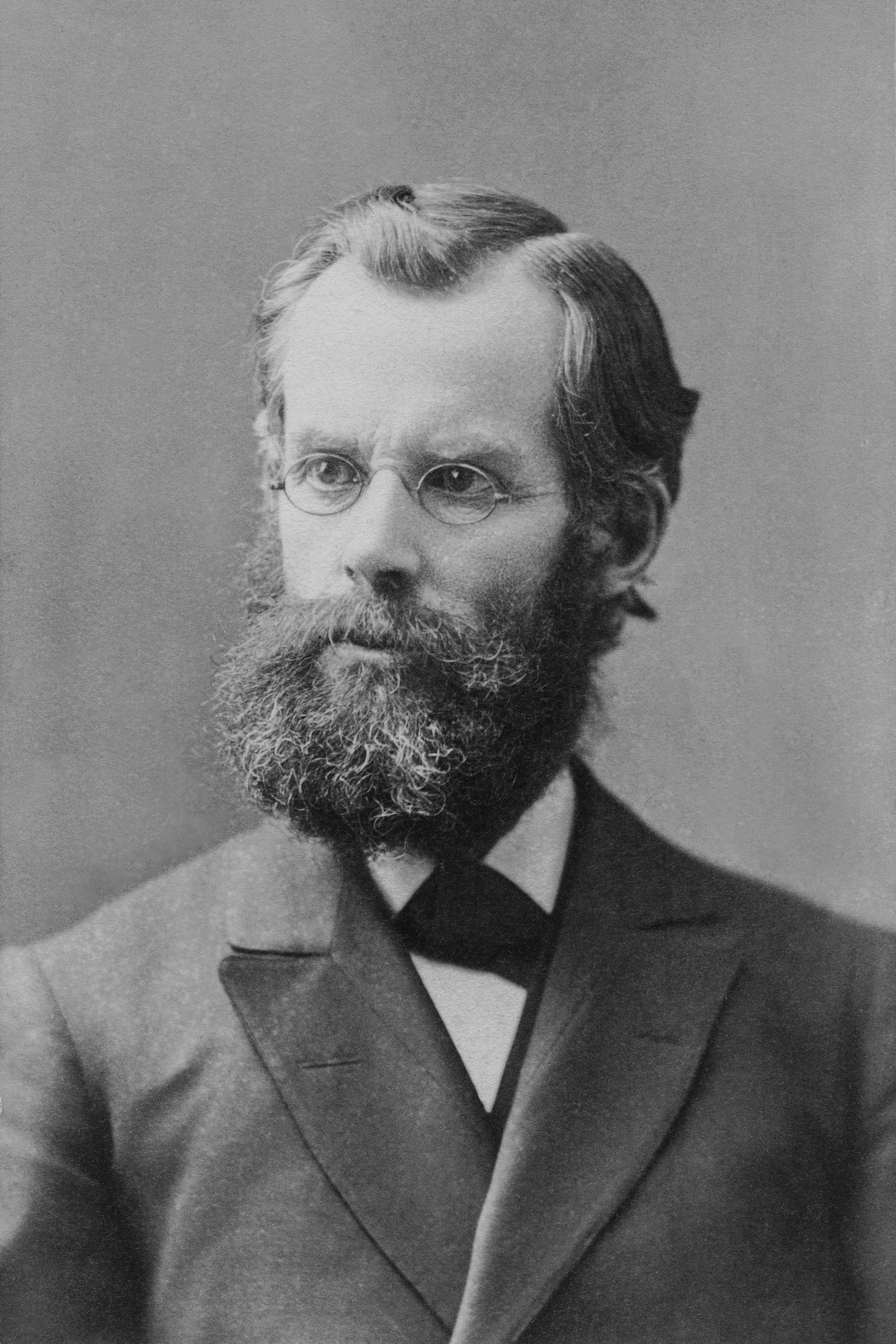
- Andrews c. 1880

Personal details
- Born: John Nevins Andrews; July 22, 1829 Poland, Maine, U.S.
- Died: October 21, 1883 (aged 54) Basel, Switzerland
- Spouse: Angeline Stevens (m. 1859; died 1872)
- Children: 4
- Occupation: President of the General Conference of Seventh-day Adventists; minister; missionary

John Nevins Andrews (July 22, 1829 – October 21, 1883) was a Seventh-day Adventist minister and co-founder of the Seventh-day Adventist Church. He was the first official Seventh-day Adventist missionary, writer, editor, and scholar. Andrews University (Michigan, USA), a university owned and operated by the Seventh-day Adventist church, is named after him.

== Biography ==
John Nevins Andrews was born on July 22, 1829, in Poland, Maine. He became a Millerite in February 1843 and began to observe the seventh-day Sabbath in 1845. He met James White and Ellen G. White in September 1849. Later, the Whites boarded with the Andrews family.

In 1850, he began itinerant pastoral ministry in New England, and he was ordained in 1853. Andrews played a pivotal role in the establishment of Adventist theology. Among his more memorable achievements in Adventist prophetic interpretation, was developing the connection between the two-horned beast of Revelation as the United States of America.

On October 29, 1856, Andrews married Angeline Stevens (1824–1872) in Waukon, Iowa, where the Andrews and Stevens families had recently moved. In June 1859, a conference in Battle Creek voted that Andrews should assist J. N. Loughborough in tent evangelism in Michigan. He returned to Iowa in the fall of 1860. During these years, their first two children were born: Charles (b. 1857) and Mary (b. 1861), and Andrews wrote the first edition of his most prominent book, The History of the Sabbath and the First Day of the Week (Battle Creek Steam Press, 1859).

In June 1862, John left Waukon to work with the evangelistic tent in New York and assisted in the founding of the New York Conference. In February 1863, Angeline and their two children moved from Iowa to join him in New York. Two more children were born to John and Angeline while in New York, both of whom died in infancy from tuberculosis. In 1864, John was chosen as the denominational representative to the provost marshal general in Washington, D.C., to secure recognition for the church as noncombatants. On May 14, 1867, Andrews was elected the third president of the General Conference (until May 18, 1869) after which he became editor of the Review and Herald (1869–1870), now the Adventist Review.

In 1872, Angeline died from a stroke. John moved to South Lancaster, Massachusetts, where the children could stay with the Harris family. Two years later (September 15, 1874) John, along with his two surviving children, Charles and Mary, were sent as the first official Seventh-day Adventist missionaries to Europe. Andrews helped start a publishing house in Switzerland and an Adventist periodical in French, Les Signes des Temps (1876). In 1878, Mary contracted tuberculosis and died soon after arriving for treatment at the Battle Creek Sanitarium.

John continued his work as a missionary in Europe, dying there of tuberculosis on October 21, 1883. He was 54. He is buried in Basel, Switzerland. His grandson, John Nevins Andrews, worked as a medical missionary in Sichuan Province, West China.

== Legacy ==
Andrews University in Berrien Springs, Michigan, was named after him in 1960, as well as John Nevins Andrews School, in 1907, which is located in Takoma Park, Maryland. In 1993, a sculpture of Andrews was unveiled in front of the Andrews University Pioneer Memorial Church. In 2005, the papers of J. N. Andrews were donated by descendants to the Center for Adventist Research.

== Bibliography ==
- Review of the Remarks of O.R.L. Crozier on the institution, design, and abolition of the Sabbath (1853)
- History of the Sabbath and First Day of the Week (1861, 2nd edition 1873, 3rd edition 1887, 4th edition with L. R. Conradi 1912)
- Samuel and the Witch of Endor, or, The Sin of Witchcraft (186-?)
- The Sanctuary and Twenty-Three Hundred Days (1872)
- The Complete Testimony of the Fathers of the First Three Centuries Concerning the Sabbath and First Day (1873, 2nd edition 1876)
- Sermon on the Two Covenants (1875)
- Three Messages of Revelation 14:6-12 (1877)
- The Sunday Seventh-day Theory; an Examination of the Teachings of Mede, Jennings, Akers, and Fuller (1884)
- The Judgement, its Events and their Order (1890)
- The Sabbath and the Law (1890?)

== See also ==
- General Conference of Seventh-day Adventists
- Seventh-day Adventist Church
- Ellen G. White
- Adventist
- Adventist Health Studies
- Seventh-day Adventist Church Pioneers
- Seventh-day Adventist eschatology
- Seventh-day Adventist theology
- Seventh-day Adventist worship
- Annie R. Smith
- History of the Seventh-day Adventist Church
- 28 fundamental beliefs
- Questions on Doctrine
- Teachings of Ellen White#End times
- Inspiration of Ellen White
- Prophecy in the Seventh-day Adventist Church
- Investigative judgment
- Pillars
- Second Advent
- Baptism by Immersion
- Conditional Immortality
- Historicism
- Three Angels' Messages
- End times
- Sabbath in Seventh-day Adventism
- Adventist
- Seventh-day Adventist Church Pioneers

== Sources ==
- Balharrie, G. (1949). "A Study of the Contribution Made to the Seventh-day Adventist Church by John Nevins Andrews" (Document). SDA Theological Seminary.
- Leonard, Harry, ed. (1985). J. N. Andrews: The Man and the Mission. Berrien Springs, Michigan: Andrews University Press. ISBN 0-943872-91-X.
- Seventh-day Adventist Encyclopedia. Vol. 10. Hagerstown, Maryland. 1996. pp. 68–69.

Preceded by James White	President of the General Conference of Seventh-day Adventists; 1867–1869	Succeeded by James White
Preceded by Uriah Smith	Editor of the Adventist Review; 1869–1870	Succeeded by Uriah Smith
