= James S. White =

Co-founder of the Seventh-day Adventist Church (1821–1881)

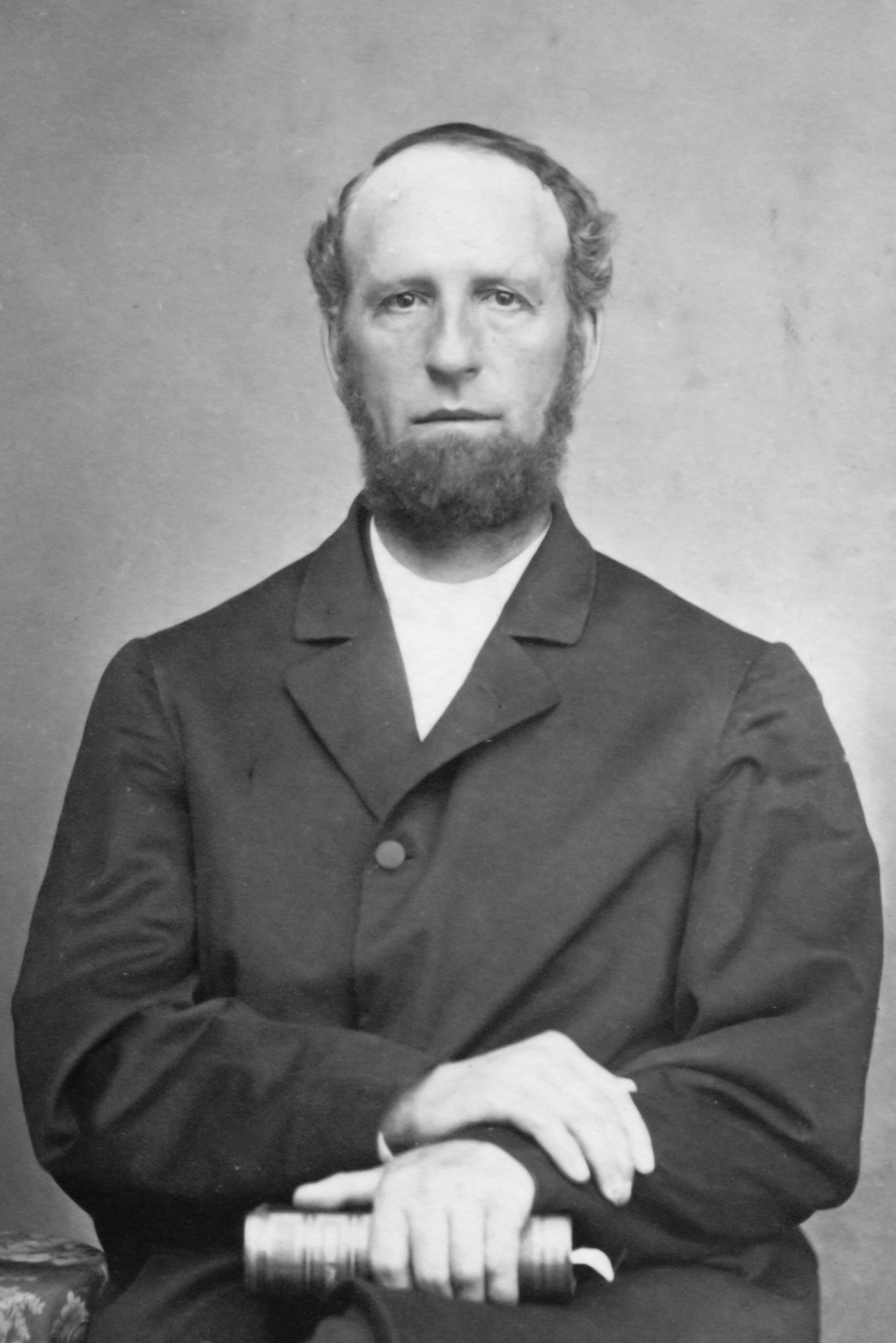
- White c. 1864

Personal details
- Born: August 4, 1821 Palmyra, Maine, US
- Died: August 6, 1881 (aged 60) Battle Creek Sanitarium, Battle Creek, Michigan, US
- Spouse: Ellen G. White (m. 1846)
- Children: 4, including James Edson White and William C. White
- Occupation: President of the General Conference of Seventh-day Adventists; Author; Teacher; Preacher; Co-founder adventist movement

James Springer White (August 4, 1821 – August 6, 1881), also known as Elder White, was a co-founder of the Seventh-day Adventist Church and the husband of Ellen G. White. In 1849, he started the first Sabbatarian Adventist periodical entitled The Present Truth, in 1855 he relocated the fledgling center of the movement to Battle Creek, Michigan, and in 1863 played a pivotal role in the formal organization of the denomination. He later played a major role in the development of the Adventist educational structure beginning in 1874 with the formation of Battle Creek College.

== Early life ==
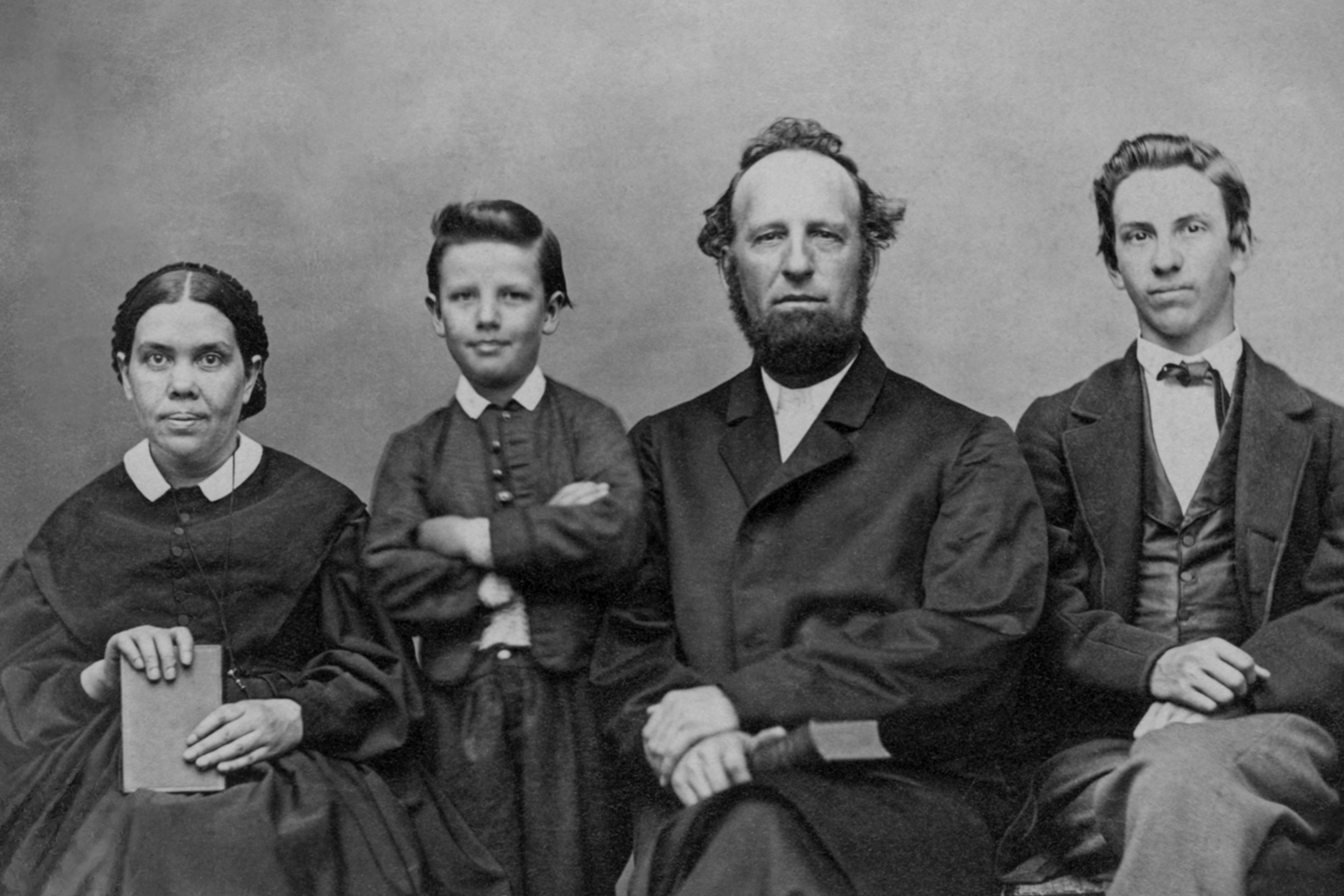
James and Ellen White family in 1865.

James White was born to Deacon John and Elizabeth "Betsey" Jewett White on August 4, 1821, in the town of Palmyra, Maine. The fifth of nine children, James was a sickly child who suffered fits and seizures. Poor eyesight prevented him from obtaining much education and he was required to work on the family farm. At age 16 his eyesight improved and he enrolled at a local academy. He earned a teaching certificate in the common branches and briefly taught at an elementary school. He was baptized into the Christian Connexion at age 15. He learned of the Millerite message from his parents and after hearing powerful preaching at an advent camp meeting in Exeter, Maine, White decided to leave teaching and become a preacher. Consequently, he has ordained a minister of the Christian Connexion in 1843. White was a powerful preacher, and it is recorded that during the winter of 1843, 1,000 people accepted the Millerite message owing to his preaching. At times, however, White was met with angry mobs who hurled snowballs at him. During these early travels he met Ellen G. Harmon whom he married on August 30, 1846. James White and Ellen G. White had four boys, Henry Nichols (1847–1863), James Edson (1849–1928), William Clarence (1854–1937) and John Herbert (1860–1860).

== Adventist service ==
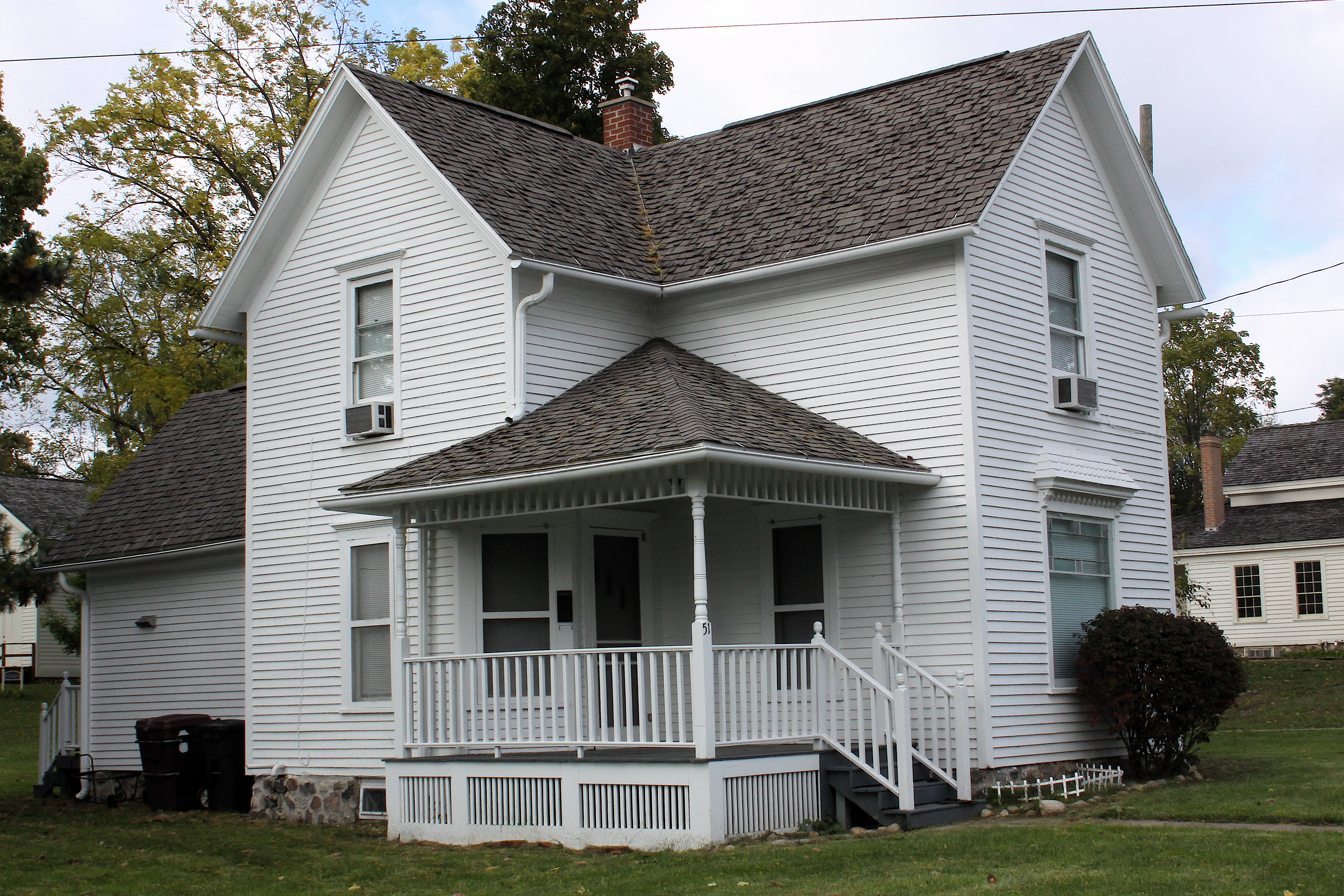
Historic Adventist Village-Home of James and Ellen White (lateral)

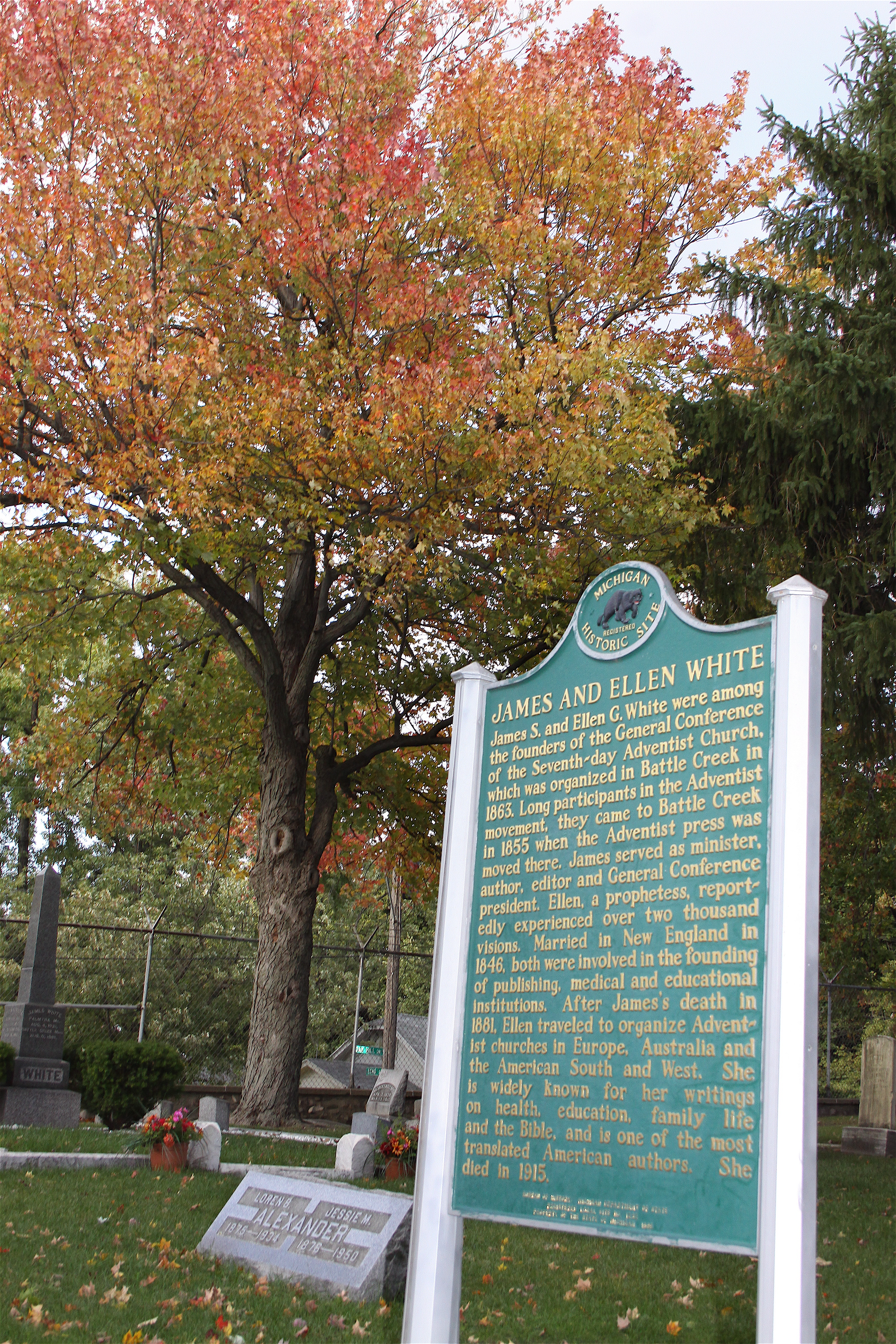
Oak Hill Cemetery-James and Ellen White

The paper which James White initially started, "The Present Truth", was combined with another periodical called the "Advent Review" in 1850 to become the "Second Advent Review and Sabbath Herald", still published as the "Adventist Review" today. This periodical became the main source of communication for the Sabbatarian Adventist movement regarding points of doctrine and organization. It also became a venue for James and Ellen White to quickly and efficiently share their views to like-minded believers. James White served as editor of the periodical until 1851 when he invited Uriah Smith to become editor. He played a senior role in the management of church publications as president of the Review and Herald Publishing Association. He also served on several occasions as president of the General Conference of Seventh-day Adventists.(1865–1867; 1869–1871; 1874–1880).

In 1865 White suffered from a paralytic stroke. White eventually determined that he should retire from the ministry and live out his days gracefully. In 1880, G. I. Butler replaced him as General Conference president. During the summer of 1881, White came down with a fever and was taken to the Battle Creek Sanitarium. Despite the efforts of Dr. Kellogg, White died on August 6, 1881.

== Publications ==
White was a prolific writer and publisher for the Adventists. Some of his most popular publications include:

- Life Incidents (1868). Republished by Andrews University Press with an introduction by Jerry Moon (publisher's page)
- Word to the Little Flock, 1847 Pamphlet
- Signs of the Times, 1853
- Life Incidents, 1868 Steam Press
- Selections from Life Incidents, 1868 Steam Press
- A Solemn Appeal Relative to Solitary Vice, and the Abuses and Excesses in Marriage Relation, 1870 Steam Press
- Sermons on The Coming and Kingdom of Our Lord Jesus Christ, 1870 Steam Press
- Sketches of the Christian Life and Public Labors of William Miller, 1875 Steam Press
- The Sounding of the Seven Trumpets of Revelation 8 & 9, 1875 Steam Press
- The Second Coming of Christ, Matthew 24, 1876
- Early Life & Experiences of Joseph Bates, 1877 Steam Press
- Biblical Institute, 1878 Steam Press
- Life Sketches, 1880 Steam Press

== See also ==
- General Conference of Seventh-day Adventists
- Seventh-day Adventist Church
- Ellen G. White
- Adventist Review
- Adventist
- Adventist Health Studies
- Seventh-day Adventist Church Pioneers
- Seventh-day Adventist eschatology
- Seventh-day Adventist theology
- Seventh-day Adventist worship
- Millerites
- History of the Seventh-day Adventist Church
- Teachings of Ellen White
- Inspiration of Ellen White
- Prophecy in the Seventh-day Adventist Church
- The Pillars of Adventism
- Second Advent
- Historicism
- Sabbath in Seventh-day Adventism

Preceded by John Byington	President of the General Conference of Seventh-day Adventists; 1865–1867	Succeeded by J. N. Andrews
Preceded by J. N. Andrews	President of the General Conference of Seventh-day Adventists; 1869–1871	Succeeded by G. I. Butler
Preceded by G. I. Butler	President of the General Conference of Seventh-day Adventists; 1874–1880	Succeeded by G. I. Butler
Preceded by (Founder)	Editor of the Adventist Review; 1851–1855	Succeeded by Uriah Smith
Preceded by Uriah Smith	Editor of the Adventist Review; 1861–1864	Succeeded by Uriah Smith
Preceded by Uriah Smith	Editor of the Adventist Review; 1871–1872	Succeeded by Uriah Smith
Preceded by Uriah Smith	Editor of the Adventist Review; 1873–1877	Succeeded by Uriah Smith
Preceded by Uriah Smith	Editor of the Adventist Review; 1880–1881	Succeeded by Uriah Smith
