= Fabric Sephardic Synagogue =

Religious building in Fabric, Timișoara, Romania

- Sinagoga Sefardă din Fabric

Religion
- Affiliation: Judaism
- Rite: Sephardic
- Ecclesiastical or organizational status: Synagogue (until 1950s); Adventist church (present)
- Status: Inactive (as a synagogue)

Location
- Location: 6 Ecaterina Teodoroiu Street, Timișoara
- Interactive map of Fabric Sephardic Synagogue
- Coordinates: 45.7587°N 21.2519°E

Architecture
- Type: Synagogue architecture
- Style: Classicism
- Established: After 1850s

The Fabric Sephardic Synagogue (Romanian: Sinagoga Sefardă din Fabric), located at 6 Ecaterina Teodoroiu Street in the Fabric district of Timișoara, Romania, is a former synagogue that served the Sephardic Jewish community, currently an Adventist church.

== History ==
Although the exact year of construction is unknown, the building's classicist style—absent of Moorish ornamentation—and its placement at the end of a courtyard rather than along the street suggest it was likely built in the second half of the 19th century.

Initially, the synagogue served worshippers of the Spanish rite. In 1905, the Sephardic synagogue in the Cetate district was demolished to allow for the construction of the community headquarters. As a result, the synagogue on Ecaterina Teodoroiu Street became the sole place of worship for those adhering to the Spanish tradition.

The synagogue remained active until the 1950s, after which it fell into disrepair. Following its closure, the furniture and several religious artifacts—including the parochet that covered the ark—were preserved and transferred to the prayer house adjacent to the New Synagogue. Among these treasured items was a richly embroidered curtain, which was stored in a box for decades before eventually being restored. Today, it adorns the ark in the small "Or Hadash" (New Light) hall, located in the courtyard of the community headquarters in Cetate, at 10 Mărășești Street. Over the years, the synagogue building underwent extensive changes and was ultimately repurposed as an Adventist church.
