= Bryan W. Ball =

British theologian (1935–2025)

27th President of Avondale College
- In office 1984–1990
- Preceded by: J. J. C. Cox
- Succeeded by: G. A. Madigan

Personal details
- Born: 11 July 1935 Bere Ferrers, Devon, England
- Died: 12 November 2025 (aged 86)
- Education: Newbold College; Andrews University
- Profession: Theologian, college administrator, author and teacher

Bryan W. Ball (11 July 1935 – 12 November 2025) was a British theologian, author, teacher, former president of Avondale College and former president of the Seventh-day Adventist Church in the South Pacific.

== Biography ==
Bryan William Ball was born in Bere Ferrers, Devon, England on 11 July 1935, the son of Cecil William Richard Ball and Nora (née Beardsell).

Ball was educated at Bedford Modern School and Tavistock Grammar School. He graduated BA from Newbold College, MA in Religion from Andrews University and was awarded a PhD from the University of London.

Ball was Chair of Theology at Newbold College between 1976 and 1984. In 1984 he moved to Australia to become president of Avondale College between 1984 and 1990. He was later made president of the South Pacific Division between 1990 and 1997 where he was instrumental in the further development of the Sydney Adventist Hospital and helped the Pacific Adventist College in Papua New Guinea achieve university status.

Ball is a widely cited scholar who has written extensively on current and historical theological issues.

Ball died on 12 November 2025, at the age of 86.

== Selected bibliography ==
- A great expectation: eschatological thought in English Protestantism to 1660. Published by Brill, Leiden, 1975
- The English connection: the Puritan roots of Seventh-Day Adventist belief. Published by J. Clarke, Cambridge, England, 1981
- The Seventh-day Men: Sabbatarians and Sabbatarianism in England and Wales, 1600-1800. Published by Oxford University Press, Oxford and New York City, 1994
- The essential Jesus: the man, His message, His mission. Published by Pacific Press Publishing Association, Nampa, Idaho, 2002; Warburton, Victoria, Australia, 2002
- Christopher Feake 1612-1683. Entry in the DNB, Oxford University Press, 2004
- Can we still believe the Bible? : and does it really matter? Published by Signs Publishing Company, Victoria, Australia, 2007
- The soul sleepers: Christian mortalism from Wycliffe to Priestley. Published by James Clarke & Co., Cambridge, 2008
- In the beginning: science and scripture confirm creation. Published by Pacific Press Publishing Association, Nampa, Idaho, 2012
- Grounds for Assurance and Hope - Selected Biblical and Historical writings of Bryan W. Ball. Published by Avondale Academic Press, 2015
