= Pitcairn (schooner) =

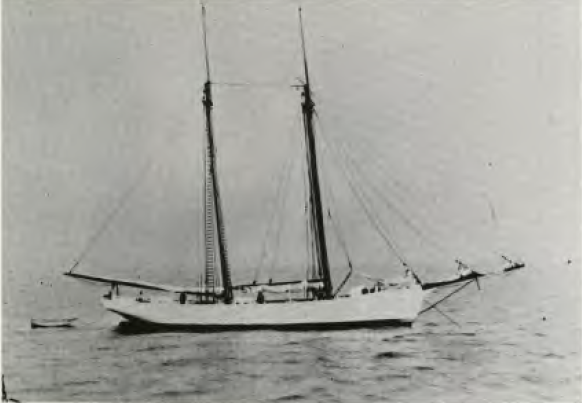
- Pitcairn as originally constructed

History

United States
- Name: Pitcairn
- Owner: Seventh-day Adventist Church
- Builder: Turner and Chapman
- Cost: $12,000
- Launched: 28 July 1890

Philippines
- Name: Florence S
- Owner: Clark and Spencer
- Cost: $6,500
- Acquired: 1900
- Out of service: 17 October 1912
- Stricken: 17 October 1912
- Fate: Wrecked

General characteristics
- Class & type: Schooner (Later re-rigged as a brigantine)
- Tons burthen: 115
- Length: 90 feet (27 m)
- Beam: 27 feet (8.2 m)
- Draft: 10 feet (3.0 m)
- Propulsion: Sail

Pitcairn was a schooner built in 1890 for the Seventh-day Adventist Church for use in missionary work in the South Pacific. After six missionary voyages, the schooner was sold in 1900 for commercial use, and renamed Florence S. She was lost by stranding on the island of Mindoro, Philippine Islands, on 17 October 1912.

== Background ==
The Seventh-day Adventist John Tay, a former sailor, was advised by his doctor to take a sea voyage in 1886. He paid his way by working as a carpenter. At Tahiti he found passage on HMS Pelican, a British man-of-war. Tay reached Pitcairn Island on HMS Pelican on 18 October 1886, and stayed until the last week of November. Pitcairn was and still is inhabited by descendants of the mutineers on HMS Bounty. The islanders were already familiar with Adventist concepts, as they had received a box of Adventist tracts about ten years earlier. (Note: In 1876 James White and John N. Loughborough had sent a box of Seventh-day Adventist literature to the island. The people had been suspicious at first, but had later studied the material, and were thus receptive to Tay's message.) In five weeks Tay converted the whole population to Adventism. He was unable to perform baptisms since he was not ordained, but promised to return with a minister.

The Adventists had devoted relatively little effort to foreign missions up to the time of Tay's voyage, despite the urging of Ellen G. White. The news of Tay's success galvanized the church. A resolution was passed at the California Adventist conference in October 1887 to buy a ship for use in missionary work in the Pacific islands. At the General Conference in Oakland that started on 13 November 1887 a committee was established to consider a resolution to use up to $20,000 to buy or build a ship, to be ready early in 1888. The committee recommended postponing the project so funds could be raised and the requirements studied.

In April 1888 the committee decided to dispatch Elder Andrew J. Cudney with Tay to Pitcairn and other islands to determine what type of vessel would be needed. Cudney left for Honolulu on 20 May 1888 on Sonomo. When he arrived he arranged to outfit a schooner at a cost of about $900 to the Conference, with the option for the Conference to buy the ship for $1,100 after a trial voyage. Cudney left Honolulu for Tahiti on Phoebe Chapman on 31 July 1888. There he was to join Tay, who had left Oakland for Tahiti on 5 July 1888. The plan was for Cudney and Tay to continue to Pitcairn Island, where Cudney could perform the promised baptisms.

Tay reached Tahiti early in August 1888 and waited there for Cudney. After three months he met a man who had seen Phoebe Chapman in Honolulu, and who described how the schooner had been altered and loaded. Tay did not consider the changes and ballast arrangement to be safe, and wrote a letter saying he did not want to sail in the schooner. After six months he gave up waiting for Phoebe Chapman, and on 14 January 1889 sailed on Tahiti for San Francisco. Cudney had vanished without trace.

== Construction ==
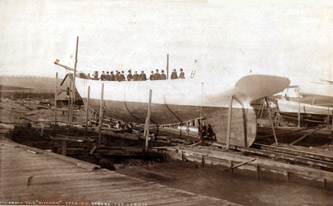
Visitors on board the ship during construction

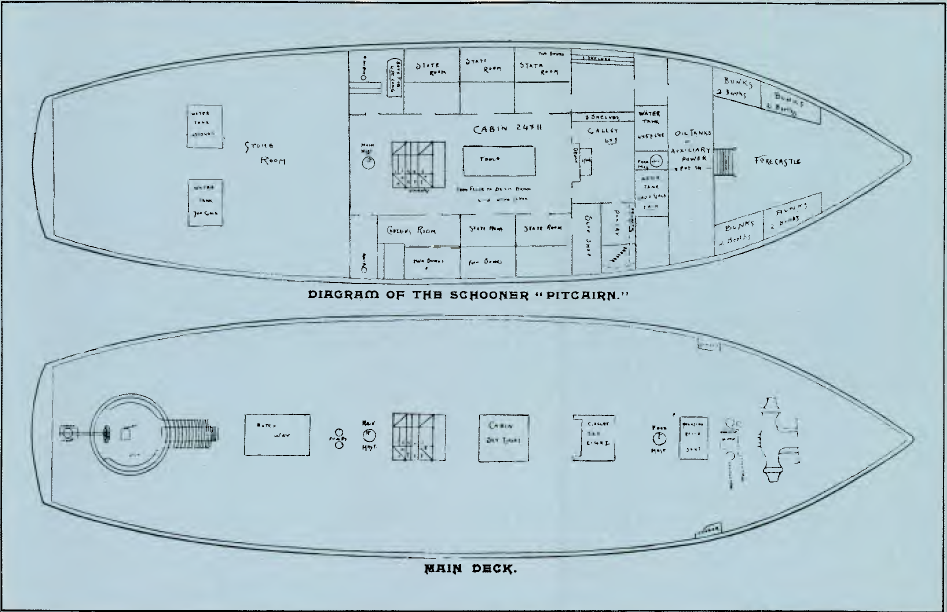
Diagram of the schooner

The General Conference of October 1889 resolved to immediately buy or built a suitable vessel for missionary work in the Pacific Islands, to be ready by the end of 1890, with at least $20,000 raised by donations to fund the project. The sum was later changed to be no more than $12,000. It was agreed to devote the world-wide Sabbath School contributions for the first six months to the cost of the ship. On 22 April 1890 Charles H. Jones and John Tay signed a detailed contract with Captain Matthew Turner, who had a shipyard at Benicia, California, to deliver a schooner complete in "hull, spars, and iron work" by 31 July 1890 at a cost of $7,400, to be paid in installments as the work progressed. Turner agreed to donate $500 of his own money, so the cost was lowered to $6,900. The cost of the schooner when fully rigged was under $12,000, although the final cost of the fully furnished vessel was $18,683.05. Donations of almost $16,000 almost covered the cost, and various publishing houses donated books worth thousands of dollars.

Pitcairn, as the schooner was named, had two masts, both about 80 feet (24 m) tall. The ship was about 100 feet (30 m) long and 27 feet (8.2 m) wide, with a depth of 10 feet (3.0 m). It had a net register tonnage of 115 tons. There were almost 1,600 yards (1,500 m) of sails, made in Chicago. Pitcairn was initially rigged as a topsail schooner. The hull was sheathed in copper to protect it from worms, and held fifty tons of slag as ballast. The forecastle had eight berths for a crew of up to twelve seamen. Beside this was the galley, and then the 11-by-24-foot (3.4 by 7.3 m) cabin, which held a bookcase and an organ besides the furniture. Six staterooms were provided for up to eighteen passengers. There were two toilet rooms and one bath room. There were two large water tanks in the aft of the vessel, which was otherwise left empty for cargo.

The ship was launched into San Francisco Bay on schedule on 28 July 1890 and work started on rigging and outfitting. The ship was dedicated on the afternoon of 25 September 1890 in a lengthy ceremony attended by about 1,500 people. A number of short trips were made in the bay before the start of the first voyage, generally carrying Sabbath School members as passengers. The white-hulled Pitcairn was described as a fine specimen of American shipbuilding, a shapely wooden craft. At Pitcairn's dedication M. C. Wilcox said the ship was "made of the very best timber" with workmanship of "the best character." One of her later captains said "She was a smart vessel and could sail like the devil."

== Missionary voyages ==
Pitcairn made a total of six voyages in the South Pacific in the 1890s, carrying missionaries to the Society Islands, Cook Islands, Samoa, Tonga and Fiji. On each of Pitcairn's voyages the vessel sailed from San Francisco to Pitcairn Island before going on to other islands. Some of the islanders became interested in missionary work, and asked to accompany missionaries assigned to other islands. Some of the islanders were brought to San Francisco for formal training at Healdsburg College.

=== First voyage ===
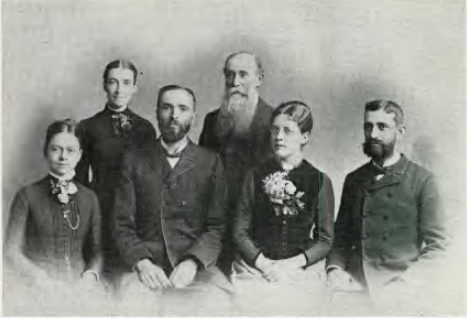
Elder and Mrs. Edward Gates (left), Elder and Mrs. Albert Read (right), Mr. and Mrs. John Tay (standing)

On its first voyage Pitcairn sailed from San Francisco on 20 October 1890 under captain Joseph Marsh. The crew included a first mate, three sailors, a cook and a cabin boy. She carried three missionary couples from San Francisco, John and Hannah Tay, Edward H. and Ida Gates, and Albert and Hattie Read. She reached Pitcairn Island on 25 November 1890. On 26 November 1890 the British ship Troop, traveling from Oregon to Cardiff, communicated with Pitcairn and was then boarded by Tay and about 20 islanders, who sold the captain fruit and vegetables. On 28 November 1890 the iron sailing ship Renee Rickmers of Bremerhaven was approaching Pitcairn Island when she saw the schooner, mistook it for a pirate, and rapidly stood out to sea to escape. During the schooner's three-week stay, 82 Pitcairn islanders were baptized.

After this Pitcairn sailed onward to other Pacific Islands. She carried three Pitcairn islanders as missionary helpers: James Russell McCoy, his sister Mary McCoy and Heywood Christian. She then continued through the Society Islands and Hervey Islands, stopping at several ports. She sailed on to Samoa, where she spent a week in Apia Harbour, then sailed via Tonga to the Fiji islands, where she called at various places. The Tays were left to conduct missionary work at Suva, Fiji. He died there after a few months. (Note: Tay died at Suva of influenza on 8 January 1892.) She left Suva on 21 September 1891 and sailed for Norfolk Island, which she reached on 30 September 1891. The Pitcairn Adventists reunited with their relatives on Norfolk and working with missionaries on board, soon established the Adventist Church on Norfolk.

The Reads, as well as Captain Marsh's wife, remained at Norfolk Island when the ship sailed on 7 October 1891 for Auckland, New Zealand. The New Zealand Herald reported the arrival of the mission schooner Pitcairn at Waitemata Harbour on 12 October 1891. Pitcairn sailed from Auckland back to Norfolk, battling head winds and high seas, then returned to Auckland where she was refitted as a brigantine. A new cabin, forecastle and galley were built above deck, since the below-deck conditions in the tropics were stifling, and an auxiliary engine was installed for use in ports. The refitted ship again left Auckland on 26 June 1892 and made a very difficult 37-day passage to Pitcairn. She finally reached San Francisco via Tahiti on 8 October 1892.

=== Second voyage ===
Locations visited by the Pitcairn during the missionary voyages

Before her second voyage various improvements were made, including enlargement of the deck cabin. On the second voyage J. Christensen, the former first mate who had become captain on the previous voyage after the death of Captain Marsh, again commanded the ship. Passengers included the missionaries Benjamin and Iva Cady, John and Fanny Cole, and Elliot and Cora Chapman. Others were the medical doctor Merritt Kellogg, the teacher Miss Hattie Andre, and James McCoy. The ship sailed from San Francisco on 17 January 1893 and reached Pitcairn on 19 February 1893. She went on to Tahiti, Huahine and Raiatea Islands, where Benjamin Cady and the Chapmans chose to stay to work as missionaries and teachers.

The ship stopped at Rurutu Island, Mangaia Island, Rarotonga and Niue Island. At all of these Kellogg treated many sick people. She bypassed Vava'u Island, Tonga, where there was a measles epidemic, to avoid being quarantined. She sailed via Fiji and Norfolk Island, where the Coles remained, to New Zealand. Pitcairn then sailed for Pitcairn Island, arriving on 6 February 1894 to find that the people had been ravaged by a typhoid epidemic. The ship reached San Francisco on 30 March 1894.

=== Third voyage ===
On the third voyage Pitcairn was captained by the Pastor John Graham. It carried Dr. Joseph Caldwell, his wife Julia and their two boys. Caldwell planned to practice medicine on Raiatea. Other missionaries were George and Ada Wellman, Rodney and Carrie Stringer, W. E. and Rosa Buckner, Dudley and Sarah Owen with their two children, and Miss Lillian White. The ship sailed on 17 June 1894 and reached Pitcairn after a rough voyage of thirty days. The crew and passengers had difficulty landing in the rough seas. Pitcairn sailed on with the islanders Maude and Sarah Young as missionaries, who received some basic medical training.

At Papeete, Tahiti the governor proved hostile and told Pitcairn not to visit Raiatea. The Wellmans and Lillian White remained at Papeete. The ship went on to Huahine Island, where the missionaries received a mixed reception, then to Rurutu Island, where the Stringers and Sarah Young were allowed to stay. The Owen and Caldwell families left the ship at Rarotonga, with Maud Young as an assistant to Caldwell. On return to Papeete they received grudging permission for a brief visit to Raiatea, from where they sailed back to San Francisco, arriving on 27 December 1894.

=== Fourth voyage ===
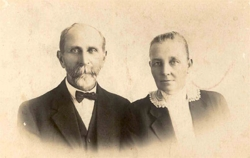
Edwin Butz with his wife Florence

The fourth voyage left San Francisco on 1 May 1895, commanded again by John Graham, Passengers were Dr. Frederick Braucht and his wife Mina, Edwin Butz with his wife Florence Butz and daughter Alma, Edward and Ida Hilliard and their daughter Alta, Jesse and Cora Rice and child, and Rowen and Pauline Prickett. They reached Pitcairn after 36 days. The Butz family remained temporarily in Pitcairn. In Tahiti Pitcairn picked up the Wellmans and Lillian White, destined for Rarotonga, and the Chapmans, who were returning to the US. The Pricketts remained in Tahiti. From Papeete the ship touched at Raiatea, Rurutu and Rimatara Island en route to Rarotonga, where the Rice and Wellman families and Lillian White left the ship.

Edward Hilliard with his wife Ida Hilliard and their two-year-old daughter Alta disembarked at Tongatapu, the main island of Tonga, on 30 August 1895. They were the first resident missionaries of the Seventh-day Adventist Church of Tonga. They lived in temporary quarters while Edward Hilliard built a four-room cottage. Around November 1895 Ida Hilliard began to teach school, first in their temporary home and then in their cottage. The Pitcairn went on to Fiji, then to Apia, Samoa, and in late October 1895 sailed from there to San Francisco which was reached in early December 1895.

=== Fifth voyage ===
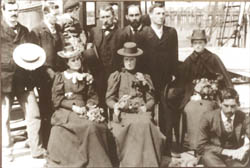
Missionaries ready to sail on Pitcairn's fifth voyage (18 May 1896)

The fifth voyage left San Francisco on 19 May 1896 under John Graham. Passengers were Herbert and Millie Dexter, Joseph and Cleora Green, Jonathan and Sophie Whatley with their son, the nurse William Floding and the Pitcairn islanders Alfred and Arthur Young. The Whatleys stayed at Pitcairn. The Butz family boarded, having been transferred to Tonga, with the Pitcairners Maria Young and Tom Christian as assistants. James McCoy and the author Rosalind Amelia Young also joined the ship. Stops included Papeete, Rurutu, Rarotonga, Aitutaki, Palmerston atoll and Samoa.

The ship reached Tongatapu on 29 August 1986. Here Edwin Butz and his wife Florence disembarked. They were accompanied by two Pitcairn Islanders, Sarah and Maria Young, descendants of Bounty mutineer, midshipman Ned Young. In 1897 Dr. Merritt Kellogg and Eleanor Kellogg joined them. Pitcairn went on the Fiji, then on the return voyage visited Vanuatu, the eastern Solomon Islands and the Marshall Islands, where they were warned off by the German authorities. She returned to San Francisco late in 1896, where she remained for over two years due to lack of funding.

=== Sixth and last voyage ===
J. Werge captained Pitcairn on its final voyage, leaving San Francisco on 23 January 1899. It did not carry any new missionaries, but did carry Edward Gates, who was in charge of missionary work on the islands and was to assess the status and needs at each island group. The vessel carried lumber for construction at the missions. The ship sailed first to Pitcairn, where it stayed for three weeks, then went on to Papeete. Raiiatea and Rarotonga, Samoa, Tonga, and Fiji. Pitcairn reached Tongatapu on 3 June 1899, bringing a small prefabricated building that was used at first as a mission home and as a chapel. After 18 months it was taken apart and rebuilt as the small Nuku'alofa church, 5 by 10 metres (16 by 33 ft). Pitcairn transferred the Butz family north to Vavaʻu Island, then sailed for Fiji on 13 June 1899. After leaving a printing press there, the ship returned to San Francisco.

== Commercial career ==
In 1900 the American Foreign Mission Board agreed that the Pacific Islands should be administered from Australia. They sold Pitcairn to W.E. Nesbitt for $6,500 soon after returning to San Francisco from its sixth voyage. She was renamed Florence S. (Another account says she was bought by the Arnold firm of San Francisco.) On 6 March 1900 she made a voyage to Cape Nome, Alaska. Towards the end of 1900 she sailed from San Francisco for a 3-month cruise off Mexico. The ship was sold to Clark and Spencer of Manila in the Philippines, and on 22 February 1901 Florence S left for Manila under Captain Blain with a cargo of flour. She was lost when she was stranded on Mindoro on 17 October 1912. None of the eight people on board were lost.

== Depictions ==
Pitcairn was depicted in a 1968 definitive Norfolk Island postage stamp.

== Sources ==
- Finau, Makisi; Leuti, Teeruro; Langi, Jione (1992). Island Churches: Challenge and Change. University of the South Pacific - Institute of Pacific Studies. ISBN 978-982-02-0077-7.
- Ford, Herbert (2011). "The Good Ship Pitcairn". Pacific Union College.
- Ford, Herbert (2012-03-14). Pitcairn Island as a Port of Call: A Record, 1790-2010, 2d ed. McFarland. ISBN 978-0-7864-8822-3.
- Fortin, Denis; Moon, Jerry (2014-04-08). The Ellen G. White Encyclopedia. Review and Herald Pub Assoc. ISBN 978-0-8127-5662-3.
- IBP USA (2013-08-01). Pitcairn Islands Business Law Handbook. Int'l Business Publications. ISBN 978-1-4387-7079-6.
- Harder, Fred M. (Summer 1979). "Pitcairn: Ship and Symbol" (PDF). Adventist Heritage. 6 (1).
- Land, Gary (2014-10-23). Historical Dictionary of the Seventh-Day Adventists. Rowman & Littlefield Publishers. ISBN 978-1-4422-4188-6.
- Hook, Milton (2007). TALAFEKAU MO'ONI – EARLY ADVENTISM IN TONGA AND NIUE (PDF). South Pacific Division Department of Education. Archived from the original (PDF) on 2015-03-24.
- Iskander, Elizabeth (2014-05-29). "AGENDA FOR GC '15: LEADERSHIP ON THE DATE LINE SABBATH". AD Vindicate. Archived from the original on 2015-04-06.
- Mokgwane, Pako (2012). "Our First Adventist Missionary to the South Pacific Islands". General Conference of Seventh-day Adventists.
- "The Mission Schooner Pitcairn". New Zealand Herald. XXVIII (8695). 1891-10-12.
- Young, Rosalind A. (1894a). "XXII The Arrival of Mr. John I. Tay". Mutiny of the Bounty and Story of Pitcairn Island, 1790-1894. Pacific Press Publishing Company. Archived from the original on 2016-03-04.
- Young, Rosalind A. (1894b). "XXIII The Missionary Ship Pitcairn". Mutiny of the Bounty and Story of Pitcairn Island, 1790-1894. Pacific Press Publishing Company. Archived from the original on 2016-03-04.
