= Avondale University =

College in New South Wales, Australia

- Former names: List: Avondale School for Christian Workers (1897–1911); Australasian Missionary College (1911–1964); Avondale College (1964–2011); Avondale College of Higher Education (2011–2019); Avondale University College (2019–2021)
- Motto: For a Greater Vision of World Needs
- Type: Private university
- Established: 1892; 134 years ago
- Accreditation: TEQSA
- Religious affiliation: Seventh-day Adventist
- Budget: A$35.57 million (2023)
- Chancellor: Glenn Townend
- Vice-Chancellor: Malcolm Coulson
- Academic staff: 56 (2023)
- Administrative staff: 100 (2023)
- Total staff: 156 (2023)
- Students: 1,495 (2023)
- Undergraduates: 1,125 (2023)
- Postgraduates: 370 (2023)
- Location: 582 Freemans Drive, Lake Macquarie, New South Wales, 2265, Australia; 33°5′13″S 151°27′40″E
- Campus: Suburban, parkland and regional, 325 hectares (3.3 km^{2})
- Colours: Yellow Blue
- Nickname: Eagles
- Sporting affiliations: UniSport
- Mascot: Avondale Eagle
- Website: avondale.edu.au

Avondale University is an Australian private university affiliated with the Seventh-day Adventist Church. It is a part of the Seventh-day Adventist education system, the world’s second largest Christian school system. It has two campuses, the Lake Macquarie campus being the primary campus situated in Cooranbong, New South Wales. The other campus is located at Sydney Adventist Hospital in the Sydney suburb of Wahroonga and is the main campus of the nursing school.

It primarily focuses in the areas of teaching, theology, and nursing, but also offers bachelor's degrees in business, science and the arts as well as certificate studies in outdoor recreation. The nursing program commences at the Cooranbong campus for one or two semesters and is completed at the Sydney Adventist Hospital with hands-on experience gained in the hospital. Master's degrees are offered in theology, education, nursing, ministry, and some business related fields by distance education, including a one-month on-campus component in the winter semester. Research doctoral (PhD) programs are offered in selected areas.

Avondale University runs Avondale Academic Press, a small academic publisher.

As Avondale College, it worked toward full University status from the Australian government for many years. It was granted full University status on 1 July 2021. It is an international affiliate of the Council for Christian Colleges and Universities.

Avondale University is an institution of the South Pacific Division of Seventh-day Adventists. The library on its Lake Macquarie campus houses a local research centre of the Ellen G. White Estate.

== Educational philosophy ==
During the 1890s, Ellen White reformed the curriculum to make the Bible the center of study, in place of the classics. This change soon spread to Adventist schools in the United States.

== History ==
A small Bible school was commenced in Melbourne in 1892, on the counsel of Ellen G. White. She preferred a rural location, and as a result a search for a rural location was commenced in 1893. A common account is the furrow story, in which Ellen White was reported to have had a vision concerning the land.

Finding land for a college seemed to be an impossible task, as the small church in Australia at the time did not have the finances to support such a project. Eventually the committee searching for the land found a 1,450-acre (5.9 km^{2}) block of land near Cooranbong (121 kilometres (75 mi) north of Sydney) priced at $3 per acre ($741/km^{2}) because of its "poor, sandy and hungry" land. They asked White to inspect the land, who gave her approval. An agricultural expert from the government who was commissioned to look over the land reported that it was of extremely poor quality. The land was purchased in the Spring of 1895, and the Avondale School for Christian Workers was opened there in 1897. In 1911 its name was changed to Australasian Missionary College. The College was a major influence on later Adventist education.

Shortly after 1951, students could study a Bachelor of Science through the external program of the University of London, and a Bachelor of Arts through Pacific Union College.

=== Renamed Avondale College ===
In 1964 the institution was renamed to Avondale College and the current men's residence, Watson Hall, and first-year women's residence, Andre Hall, were completed by the following year. In 1974 it received government accreditation to offer bachelor's degrees of its own. Master's degrees were first offered in the 1970s, through Andrews University, and from Avondale itself in the 1990s.

=== To University Status ===
In 2013, the college signed a memorandum of understanding with Charles Sturt University in its bid to attain full university status and, in the academic year 2015, the first students graduated with degrees jointly awarded by both institutions.

In 2019, TEQSA approved Avondale College of Higher Education’s change of category application from "Higher Education Provider" to "Australian University College".

In 2021, TEQSA approved Avondale University's change of category application from "Australian University College" to full Australian University status.

=== Adventist Heritage Centre ===
Information and records of the Oceania region are kept at the Adventist Heritage Centre, which is located within the library of the University campus.

=== Heritage architecture ===
There are a number of historic buildings that have been preserved on the Cooranbong campus. These include Bethel Hall and College Hall (which formerly functioned as the College Chapel), both of which are unique multi-storey wooden buildings. The refurbished Chan-Shun Auditorium is based on the original auditorium. Photographs and memorabilia of the College in its early years are housed in the Sunnyside Museum located at the nearby EG White Estate.

=== Today ===
The Cooranbong shopping district and Freemans Drive now occupy some of the land that was part of the Avondale Estate, creating a disjointed estate. Avondale School, which once shared facilities with the university, and the Cooranbong Aerodrome (which up until 2006 was used as part of the aviation certificate training) are located on one section and the university on the other.

FEE-HELP was introduced to the College in 2005. PhD degrees have been offered since 2006 upon approval from the New South Wales Department of Education and Training. In 2010, the college council voted to change its name to "Avondale College of Higher Education" as an interim step to achieving full university status.

For 30 years the college operated a school of aviation, first at Cooranbong and then at Cessnock Airport in the Hunter Valley after Cooranbong Airport closed. In 2008 the school was closed due to concerns over its long-term financial sustainability. Enrollment for the school reopened in January 2009. However, the school was sold in 2010.

The University maintains close links with many colleges and universities within the Seventh-day Adventist education system and international students have an option of spending the semester or year at Avondale. It also has mutual agreements with the University of Newcastle, University of New England and the nearby branch of Charles Sturt University, where students have had the option to do "cross-credit" courses online.

== List of presidents/Vice-Chancellors ==
- Cassius B. Hughes: 1897–98; 1900–02
- Edwin R. Palmer: 1899
- Charles W. Irwin: 1903–08
- John H. Paap: 1909
- Benjamin F. Machlan: 1910–12
- George Teasdale: 1913–14
- Joseph Mills: 1915
- Johan M. Johanson: 1916–17
- Ludwig D. A. Lemke: 1918–20
- Henry Kirk: 1921
- William W. Prescott: 1922
- Lynn H. Wood: 1923–27
- Erwin E. Cossentine: 1928–29
- Hubert K. Martin: 1930–32
- Albert E. Speck: 1933–35
- Cyril S. Palmer: 1936–37
- Albert H. Piper: 1938–39
- Thomas C. Lawson: 1940–43
- Benjamin H. McMahon: 1944
- Edward E. Rosendahl: 1945–46
- William G. C. Murdoch: 1947–52
- Edward E. White: 1953–58
- E. Gordon McDowell: 1959–70
- Eric A. Magnusson: 1971–81
- James J. C. Cox: 1981–84
- Bryan W. Ball: 1984–90
- Geoffrey A. Madigan: 1990–2003
- John F. Cox: late 2003–08
- Ray C. W. Roennfeldt: 2009–20
- Kevin Petrie: 2020–2023
- Kerri-Lee Krause: 2023–2024
- Malcolm Coulson: 2024–present

== Academic organisation ==
The university is organised into four schools:

- School of Arts and Business
- School of Ministry and Theology
- School of Nursing and Health
- School of Education and Science

=== Undergraduate ===
All courses are taught on the Lake Macquarie campus. The nursing school is primarily located on the grounds of Sydney Adventist Hospital in Wahroonga. Nursing students have the option of spending their first year on either campus.

=== Postgraduate ===
The university offers Master's degrees (taught and research) and graduate certificates/diplomas in education, nursing, leadership and management, arts, theology and ministry. The PhD programme is offered predominantly in the fields of Education, Arts and Theology.

=== Tuition, loans and financial aid ===
For international students starting in 2025, tuition fees range from A$35,864 to A$48,480 per academic year for award programs lasting at least one year, with a 5% discount after the first year. Australian citizens may be offered a federally-subsidised Commonwealth Supported Place (CSP) which substantially decreases the student contribution amount billed to the student. The maximum student contribution amount limits that can be applied to CSP students are dependent on the field of study.

Since 2021, Commonwealth Supported Places have also been limited to 7 years of equivalent full-time study load (EFTSL), calculated in the form of Student Learning Entitlement (SLE). Students may accrue additional SLE under some circumstances (e.g. starting a separate one-year honours program) or every 10 years. Domestic students are also able to access the HECS-HELP student loans scheme offered by the federal government. These are indexed to the Consumer or Wage Price Index, whichever is lower, and repayments are voluntary unless the recipient passes an income threshold.

The university also offers several scholarships, which come in the form of bursaries or tuition fee remission.

== Student life ==
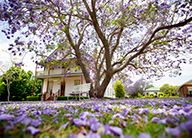
Bethel Hall, built in 1897, dates to the founding the college

Avondale University fosters a wide variety of students from varying cultural backgrounds and beliefs. Over the years, the college has hosted students from all continents. The majority of students are from Australia, New Zealand, North America and Pacific Islands. Exchange or transfer students from Adventist tertiary institutions in Europe and Asia make up the bulk of foreign students not from the aforementioned countries.

On campus, social activities form a part of student life outside academics. The auditorium, gym, library, College Hall, and cafeteria all provide meeting places for students. Both Indoor and Outdoor students have ready access to on campus events and services.

In common with the Seventh-day Adventist community, Avondale University ceases secular activities on a Friday afternoon. Over the Sabbath hours students are encouraged, though not required, to attend a variety of religious programs. There are student-led Bible study groups and evening worship services open to students and staff alike. The men's and women's residences also host their own worship services during the weekday.

Evangelical author Philip Yancey gave a presentation at Avondale College Church on 20 October 2001, which was broadcast throughout the South Pacific Division. He returned to speak again at Avondale in 2007.

=== Residential ===
The Lake Macquarie campus has three halls of residence: Watson Hall for males, Ella Boyd Hall for females and Andre Hall for guest visits. Students also have the option of renting a College View residence, an off-campus housing estate owned by the university.

The Sydney campus (nursing school) has a single large hall of residence mainly for female students. Male students reside in a separate section of the building.

=== Avondale University Church ===
"University Church" is situated on the main (Lake Macquarie) campus. Seating 900, it is one of the largest Adventist churches in Australia. Its main services are "7:28" (formerly "First Church") on Friday evenings; as well as small group Bible study or "Sabbath School", children's Sabbath School and a main church service on Saturday mornings.

The church regularly hosts major college events, such as an annual presentation on church-related topics and other creative arts events or concerts. Keynote speakers at the presentation have been Fritz Guy at the 13–15 September 2002 conference, "Being Adventist in 21st Century Australia" (papers available online), Bill Johnsson in the 22–24 August 2003 conference, "Hebrews for Aussies in Century 21", Alden Thompson in 2004, and Kendra Haloviak in 2005. The 2006 conference included Andrews University president Niels-Erik Andreasen as a presenter. It was initiated by the "Membership and Relational Issues Committee" which formed in 2001. The annual Avondale College Murdoch Lecture started in 1997.

== Publications ==
Student publications include the Orana, "a means of introducing students and staff to each other" early in the semester, and the yearbook Jacaranda. There is also a student newspaper called "The Voice", which is published twice a month. The weekly campus newsletters is named Connections.

=== Notable alumni ===
- David Down, archaeologist and author who studied theology there in 1941, and later taught there in the academic year 1964/65 while on furlough from India
- Michael Chamberlain

== See also ==
- List of Seventh-day Adventist colleges and universities
- Seventh-day Adventist education
- Seventh-day Adventist Church
- Seventh-day Adventist theology
- History of the Seventh-day Adventist Church
- Christian school
- List of Seventh-day Adventist medical schools
- List of Seventh-day Adventist secondary schools
- List of Seventh-day Adventist hospitals
- Australian Union Conference of Seventh-day Adventists
- Avondale School (Cooranbong)

=== References ===
Other resources

- Avondale: Experiment on the Dora by Milton Hook. Cooranbong, New South Wales: Avondale Academic Press, 1998
- Avondale and the South Pacific: 100 Years of Mission ed. Barry Oliver, Alex S. Currie, and Douglas E. Robertson (Cooranbong, New South Wales: Avondale Academic Press, 1997)
- The Changing Role of Ellen G. White in Seventh-day Adventism With Reference to Sociocultural Standards at Avondale College by Michael Chamberlain (PhD thesis, University of Newcastle, 2001). Rewritten as the forthcoming book Beyond Ellen White: Seventh-day Adventism in Transition – A Sociological History and Analysis of the Australian Church and its Higher Education System (2008)
- Revisioning Mission: Avondale's Greater Vision by Stephen J. Currow (Cooranbong, New South Wales: Avondale Academic Press, 2000)

=== External links ===
- Avondale University official website
- Avondale College Church official website
- History of Avondale College from adventist.org.au
- "Music at Avondale College: An Historical Overview" by Dan Shultz and Robb Dennis. Notes (the journal of the International Adventist Musicians Association) winter/spring 2008
