= Cambodia Adventist School – Kantrok =

Adventist International School Siem Reap
- Siem Reap; Cambodia

Information
- School type: Private
- Denomination: Seventh-day Adventist
- Established: 1999
- Principal: Tim Maddocks
- Gender: Co-educational
- Enrolment: 300 (2007)
- Classrooms: <!25 Number of classrooms in the school -->
- Campus size: <!3ha The size of the school campus -->

Adventist International School Siem Reap is a K-12 co-educational Christian school located in Siem Reap, Cambodia. Unlike Cambodia Adventist International School located in Phnom Penh, it is registered as a Cambodia Adventist Mission rural school but is operated by "Salt Ministries".

The school is operated and funded by SALT Ministries. The school charges a nominal fee of US$240 per student per year, but many families are too poor to pay this. ".

== History ==
Adventist International School Siem Reap (formerly Cambodia Adventist School – Kantrok) began in 1999 as a literacy school for poor children. When the school first opened in 1999, classes were held on a veranda. Later the students received desks to sit on. The first permanent school building was constructed in 2002, with five classrooms. Today the school has 25 classrooms offering bilingual education from Kindergarten to grade 12.

In the year 2004, the school was officially recognised by the Cambodian government as a primary school. Having a Seventh-day Adventist school is important as government schools teach students on Saturdays, which conflicts beliefs of the Seventh-day Adventist Church, and many schools will not allow children to have Saturdays off.

== Academics ==
As of October 2023, the Cambodia Adventist School – Kantrok, has 226 students studying in grades K-12. The AISS has a strong emphasis on both academic and vocational training.

== See also ==
- Wat Preah Yesu
- Cambodia Adventist School
- Seventh-day Adventist education
- List of Seventh-day Adventist secondary and elementary schools
