= Cooranbong Airport =

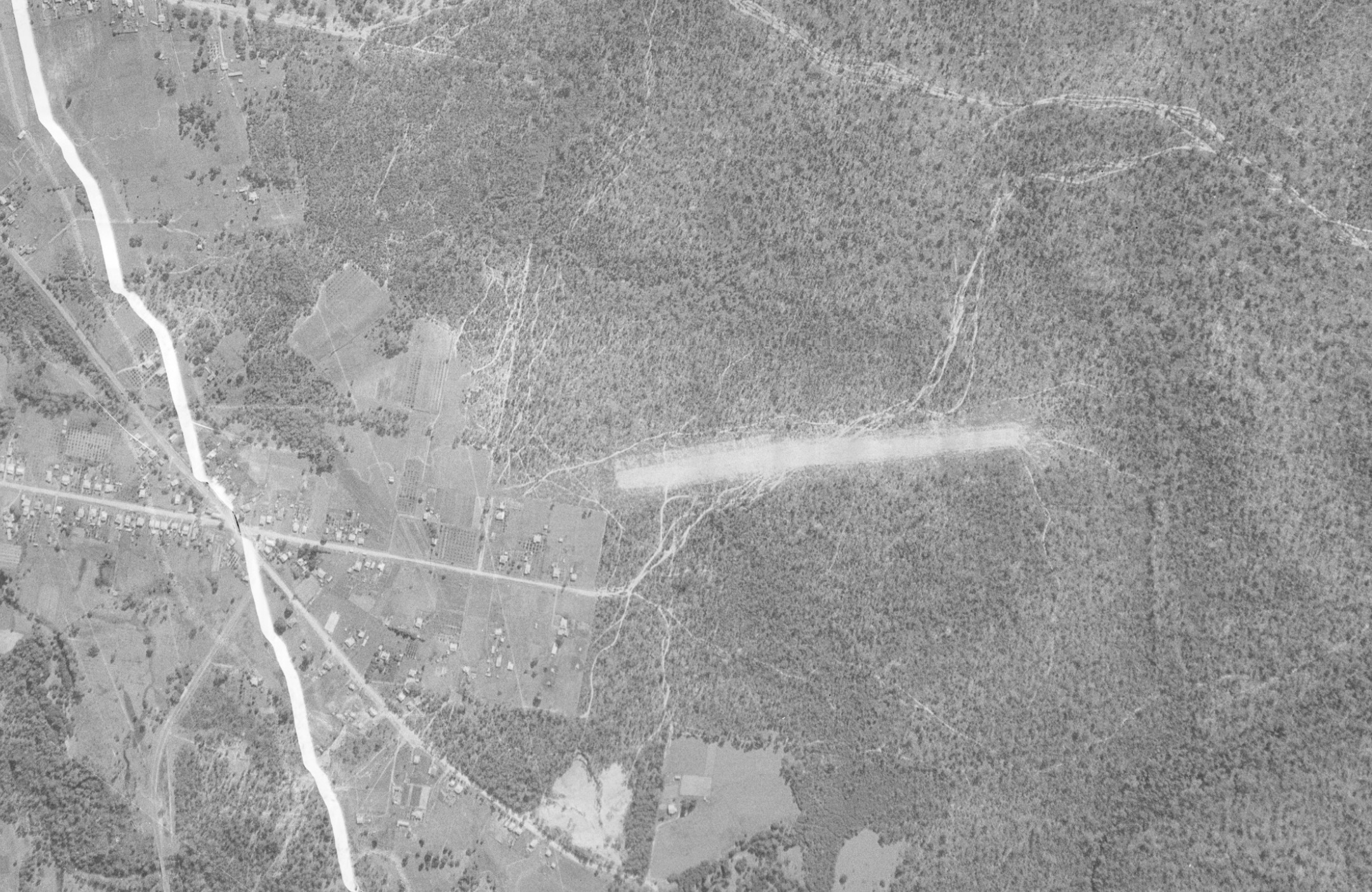
- An aerial photograph of Cooranbong Airfield, 7 March 1954.
- IATA: none; ICAO: YCOB/YOOB

Summary
- Airport type: Defunct
- Owner: Avondale University
- Operator: Adventist Aviation (former)
- Serves: Cooranbong
- Location: Cooranbong, New South Wales, Australia
- Opened: 1949
- Closed: 2005
- Coordinates: 33°03′48″S 151°27′46″E
- Interactive map of Cooranbong Airport

Runways
Direction	Length		Surface
Direction	m	ft	Surface
06/24	1,067	3,500	Grass
17/35	790	2,591	Bitumen

Cooranbong Airport (ICAO: YCOB or YOOB) was an airport and flying school operated by Avondale University located in Cooranbong, New South Wales. It operated until 2005 when operations were relocated to Cessnock Airport.

== History ==
On June 26, 1946, an undated letter received from Brethren Harris, Davis, and Lantzke requested 600 acres of back paddock to be cleared for the construction of an airstrip. Soon afterwards, the Board voted to grant permission, signed by the principal of Avondale University. At the time, the airport was a concept.

The construction of the 300-yard-long airstrip began with hand tools, and it was too short for Australia's aviation standards at the time, which required 500 yards. The site was used by Adventist Aviation until WWII. Around 1949-1952, the airstrip was extended and officially opened. On July 1, 1964, fundraising and logistics efforts for the airfield converged. In the 1970s, the runway received upgrades, night lighting, and two buildings were installed.

=== Flying School ===
On 16 March 1977, the Board received a seven-point report to landscape the flight school facility. In the following year, it accepted a quotation from W.G. Guidox Pty. Ltd. for $22,000. This plan also included an east-west runway that cost $4,000 and the purchase of several Cessna 152 aircraft for Avondale College Flying School. In 1979, the board authorized the Airport Control Committee to extend private flying operations. The aviation school was known to have one of the best pass rates, ranging from two to three times higher than national standards.

== Closure ==
On February 5, 2005, a closing ceremony took place, including several flypasts by the flying school over Avondale College. The flying school was relocated to Cessnock Airport, and the site of the airport was released to developers in stages over 10 to 20 years.
