= Michał Belina Czechowski =

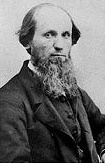
Michael Belina Czechowski

Michał Belina Czechowski (September 25, 1818 – February 26, 1876) was a Polish Seventh-day Adventist. On an individual level, he was the first Adventist missionary to Europe, although this was initially unknown by the Seventh-day Adventist church at the time, and J. N. Andrews was the first official Seventh-day Adventist missionary.

== Biography ==
=== Background ===
Michael Czechowski was born in Poland and raised in the Roman Catholic Church, becoming a priest. He entered the Stopnica Monastery, but soon became disillusioned with the church, believing many of his fellow clergy to be corrupt. He was also in danger because he was involved with the Polish nationalism movement. He travelled to Rome, where in October 1844 he met with Pope Gregory XVI, hoping to strengthen his faith; however, the meeting further convinced him that the Catholic Church was corrupt. Czechowski left the Catholic priesthood in September 1850. He married the same year in Solothurn, Switzerland with Maria Virginia Delavouet; after which he worked as a bookbinder in Brussels.

=== Conversion ===
In London he became acquainted with the Baptists, who helped him secure passage to the United States. In 1852, he became an evangelist for the Baptists, and began working among the French Canadians of New York State.

He discovered the Adventists in 1856, and at a camp meeting in Findlay, Ohio in 1857 joined the Adventist church. After conversion, Czechowski continued to work among the French Canadians in Quebec and New England, this time as an Adventist minister together with Daniel T. Bourdeau. In 1860, he moved to New York City, where he established a church in Brooklyn and worked among the French, Poles, Italians, Germans, and Swedish Americans. He published a book in 1862 about his experiences in Europe, entitled Thrilling and Instructive Developments.

=== Conflict ===
However, Czechowski was not content with his ministry in New York, and attempted to persuade the newly organized Seventh-day Adventist Church to send him to Italy as a missionary, where he hoped to work among the descendants of the Waldensians in Northern Italy. He hoped to eventually spread his new faith to his native Poland. The church refused, because they believed that Czechowski was too new to the faith, was not very good with money, was unwilling to listen to authority, and was generally an unstable person.

Czechowski was not deterred. He travelled to Boston, where he met with the leaders of the Advent Christian Church, a first-day Adventist church, and got them to sponsor him as a missionary to Europe. He left in 1864 with his wife and an Advent Christian named Annie E. Butler.

=== Italy and Switzerland ===
Despite the fact that Czechowski had been sent by the Advent Christian Church, the message he preached was thoroughly Seventh-day Adventist, eventually causing the loss of his Advent Christian sponsorship in 1868. Czechowski spent the first year preaching in the Piedmont region of Italy. However, he was soon forced to move on to Switzerland because of local opposition. In Switzerland, he began publishing a paper entitled L'Evangile éternel, as well as religious tracts in French and German. In his teachings, he mainly focused on the seventh-day sabbath and the Adventist understanding of prophecy in the biblical books of Daniel and Revelation.

He founded a congregation in Tramelan, Switzerland with nearly 60 members, as well as many other smaller groups. However, he did not tell his church of the existence of Adventists of any branch, merely stating that his teachings came "from the Bible." A Tramelan believer who visited Czechowski's home one day discovered a copy of the Review and Herald, and realized that Czechowski had been concealing the existence of other believers like them. The Tramelan congregation contacted the General Conference, and was invited to send a delegate to the General Conference session in 1869. This was hidden from Czechowski.

James Erzberger, a young theology student, was chosen as the delegate and sent to America. However, he arrived too late for the session. Despite this, the knowledge of the existence of the Swiss Adventists inspired the General Conference to establish the first Seventh-day Adventist missionary society to support overseas missions such as the Switzerland church; this society would later send the first official Seventh-day Adventist missionary, John Nevins Andrews, to Switzerland in 1874. As for James Erzberger, he stayed in America and became an ordained Seventh-day Adventist minister; then returned to Switzerland in 1870 to minister to the Tramelan church.

=== Romania ===
Czechowski became disturbed upon learning of the contacts between the Tramelan church and the Seventh-day Adventist church. As he was also suffering from financial problems at this time, he left Switzerland. He travelled through Germany and Hungary before eventually settling in Romania.

Czechowski worked for several years in Romania, where he was hampered by a lack of knowledge of Romanian. Despite this, Czechowski won 12 converts in Pitești, again without telling them of the knowledge of the Seventh-day Adventist church. One of these converts later made contact with J. N. Andrews in Switzerland.

=== Death and significance ===
Czechowski died in a Vienna hospital on February 25, 1876.

For many years after his death, he was a controversial figure in the Seventh-day Adventist church, likely a result of his going to the rival Advent Christian Church for sponsorship. According to J. N. Andrews, the missionary who followed Czechowski to Switzerland, Czechowski had caused "pain and sadness" to the people of God, and that the work of God had only progressed in spite of him.

However, Czechowski's work can be said to have forced the Adventist movement to become an international one. The discovery of the Swiss church was the main impetus behind the formation of the Seventh-day Adventist missionary society, which led to the sending of Andrews to Europe, as well as many more to follow. Only in 1871 did Ellen G. White receive her first vision from God telling her to tell the church to expand internationally, and to send missionaries abroad.

Thus Czechowski might be said to be the father of the Seventh-day Adventist church in Europe, as well as the father of Adventist missions.

== See also ==
- History of the Seventh-day Adventist Church
