= Glendon Aerodrome =

- IATA: none; ICAO: none

Summary
- Airport type: Satellite aerodrome (maintenance)
- Location: Glendon, New South Wales, Australia
- Built: 1942
- Occupants: Royal Australian Air Force

Glendon Aerodrome was an aerodrome constructed in 1942 by the Royal Australian Air Force as a satellite aerodrome near Glendon, New South Wales, Australia during World War II.

The runway was 5,000 feet (1,500 m) long x 150 feet (46 m) wide. The aerodrome was as a maintenance satellite field for RAAF Station Pokolbin near Cessnock.

The aerodrome was abandoned after World War II.
