= Wat Preah Yesu =

Wat Preah Yesu (Khmer: វត្តព្រះយេស៊ូ, Vôtt Preăh Yésu [ʋɔət preah jeːsuː]) is a children's orphanage, school and church located outside the town of Siem Reap in Siem Reap Province, Cambodia. As of 2007, it cares for approximately 134 children. Many of the children have been orphaned by HIV/AIDS, and some of them suffer from the disease themselves. The orphanage is run by members of the Seventh-day Adventist Church.

The title is derived from the Khmer language where wat means temple, preah means sacred and Yesu means Jesus. The overall meaning of the school is "Jesus pagoda". The school is known as the "Cambodia Adventist School – Kantrok" which is located on the same property. Accommodation is also given to a small number of boarding students who have a home elsewhere.

== Structure ==
The children are grouped into "families" of up to 16 children together with a married couple who serve as "house parents." As of January 2007, there were four duplex houses. A total of eight duplex houses were planned, which would allow for the accommodation of 250 children.

The staff at Wat Preah Yesu are considered volunteers, and include teachers, house parents and general staff. The leaders Tim and Wendy Maddocks are Australian citizens.

== History ==
The 19 hectare property was purchased in March 1996 for US$ 10,000. A health center operated for several years but was closed due to government/council regulations.

== Mission trips ==
Groups from Marienhoehe College in Darmstadt, Germany; and the Collegedale Church at Southern Adventist University in Collegedale, Tennessee have regularly contributed voluntary service. In December 2006, a team from Avondale College in Australia also provided volunteer service.

In December 2007/January 2008, a team of 40 volunteers from Kellyville Seventh-day Adventist Church in Sydney, Australia attended the orphanage and helped complete the construction of another house. The team raised $50,000 to help pay for building materials with excess funds being used to purchase an additional generator and much-needed everyday items for each home.

Avondale School students planned to revisit in late 2009. On November 21-28th, 30 staff and students from Avondale School (Cooranbong, NSW) stayed and had an enjoyable experience.

== Cambodia Adventist School – Kantrok ==
Cambodia Adventist School - Kantrok began in 1999 as a literacy school for poor children. In the year 2004, the school was officially recognised by the Cambodian government as a primary school. Having a Seventh-day Adventist school is important as government schools teach students on Saturdays, which conflicts with Adventist beliefs about the seventh-day Sabbath, and many schools will not allow children to have Saturdays off.

== See also ==
- Cambodia Adventist School – Kantrok
- Cambodia Adventist School
- Seventh-day Adventist Church
- Seventh-day Adventist theology
- Seventh-day Adventist eschatology
