= Avondale School (Cooranbong) =

Location
- Cooranbong, Lake Macquarie, Hunter Region, New South Wales; Australia
- Coordinates: 33°03′48″S 151°27′54″E

Information
- Type: Independent co-educational early learning, primary and secondary day school
- Motto: Real Learning For Real Life
- Religious affiliation: Australian Union Conference of Seventh-day Adventists
- Denomination: Seventh-day Adventist
- Established: 1897; 129 years ago
- Educational authority: New South Wales Department of Education
- Principal: Debra Cooper
- Employees: 75
- Years: Early learning and K–12
- Enrolment: 895
- Campus size: 17 hectares (42 acres)
- Campus type: Regional
- Colours: Navy, red, white
- Athletics: Hunter Region Independent Schools
- Website: www.avondaleschool.nsw.edu.au

Avondale School is an independent Seventh-day Adventist co-educational early learning, primary and secondary day school, located in Cooranbong, in the Hunter Region of New South Wales, Australia. The school provides an education for over 900 students each year. It is the oldest continuously operating Adventist school in Australia. It is a part of the Seventh-day Adventist education system, the world's second largest Christian school system.

== History ==
The Avondale School was founded in 1897 on the grounds of Avondale University and had an initial enrolment of 15 students. During the 1970s, due to the growth of Avondale University, the school needed to find a new location. In 1980, the school moved to its present location at the end of Avondale Road. Expansion during the 1980s included a new secondary library and a music building. Further expansions include the Avondale Early Learning Centre in 2003, a Kindy building in 2006 and a multi-purpose gymnasium and hall in June 2007, The iCentre and IT centres in 2011 and an administration building in 2012. A trade training centre was opened in 2012 to enable the extension of VET education for senior students.

== Campus ==
Avondale School is situated in the township of Cooranbong in the foothills of the Watagan Mountains. The campus is a 10-minute drive from the shores of Lake Macquarie.

The school is situated on a 17-hectare (42-acre) bushland property at the end of a cul-de-sac. Its facilities include a multi-purpose gymnasium and hall containing two basketball courts, a stage, a commercial kitchen, and uniform shop; the iCentre housing libraries for both the primary and secondary schools, and the IT centre; a music building; a trade training centre and an industrial arts room.

== Student life ==
The K-12 educational program at Avondale School provides a wide variety of opportunities for learning. Students can use their laptops to access the campus-wide wireless network and broadband internet service.

=== Extracurricular Activities ===
Students are encouraged to pursue interests outside the classroom as part of a wholesome education. There are sport teams such as soccer, touch rugby, swim teams, netball, basketball and athletics, they also participate in concert band and choir outside of campus. As a member of the Hunter Region Independent Schools, Avondale School regularly participates in inter-school events and competitions.

=== Duke of Edinburgh Award ===
Avondale School encourages personal development by offering students the Duke of Edinburgh Award program. It motivates young people to become involved in a program of voluntary and self-development activities. The Award helps takes students through a potentially difficult period of schooling. It is a major international program that is recognised by organisations around the world.

Depending on the varying ability and commitment level, there are three levels, Bronze, Silver and Gold. Students participate out of school hours in numerous community services, physically challenging and personal skill-based activities. It is an optional extension to the existing Outdoor Education program of Year camps.

In the past, students have travelled to Tasmania's Cradle Mountain, the local Watagan Mountains and Sydney Harbour Bridge for various challenges. Hiking, abseiling, cycling and the bridge climb push the physical boundaries of participants while community service projects involve helping with StormCo, the Rural Fire Brigade and Black Sabbath school programs at the local churches.

However after Bill Ward left the school the Award has no longer continued to operate.

=== Community service ===
Avondale provides many extracurricular opportunities for service. The annual StormCo trips to remote towns, the concert band and choir visits to small churches and the annual charity contributions to valued causes, provide opportunities to serve the community.

During November, Avondale school gives outgoing Year 12 students an opportunity to conclude their final year with an international service project called "Rokforce". The team is made up of students, teachers and parents who travel to foreign countries at their own expense to help poor communities.

The 2009 Avondale Schoolies Rokforce (ASR) have untaken a $20,000 project in the Cambodian Wat Preah Yesu Orphanage. The orphanage has major needs and ASR have elected to build a media room, run outreach programs and interact with the children in a number of fun ways.

== See also ==
- Seventh-day Adventist education
- List of Seventh-day Adventist secondary schools
- List of non-government schools in New South Wales
