= Romanian Union Conference of Seventh-day Adventists =

- Uniunea de Conferințe a Bisericii Adventiste de Ziua a Șaptea din România
- The Seventh-day Adventist logo
- Type: Western Christianity
- Classification: Protestant
- Orientation: Adventist
- Scripture: Bible
- Theology: Seventh-day Adventist
- Polity: Presbyterian/Episcopal
- President: Aurel Neațu
- Subdivision of the: Seventh-day Adventist Church
- Conferences: 6
- Associations: Inter-European Division of Seventh-day Adventists
- Region: Romania
- Language: Romanian, Hungarian
- Headquarters: Str. Erou Iancu Nicolae nr. 38-38 A, Voluntari, Ilfov County
- Founder: Michał Belina Czechowski
- Origin: 1870
- Recognition: 1948
- Congregations: 1,269
- Members: 62,215
- Pastors: c. 340
- Places of worship: 1,185
- Secondary schools: 3
- Tertiary institutions: 1
- Other name(s): Seventh-day Adventist Church of Romania
- Publications: Curierul Adventist; Semnele Timpului
- Official website: adventist.ro

The Romanian Union Conference of Seventh-day Adventists (Romanian: Uniunea de Conferințe a Bisericii Adventiste de Ziua a Șaptea din România) is Romania's seventh-largest religious body, part of the worldwide Seventh-day Adventist Church. At the 2011 census, 85,902 Romanians declared themselves to be Seventh-Day Adventists. The church put its own membership at 62,215 in 2020. Ethnically, in 2002, they were 83.5% Romanians, 9.7% Hungarians, 4.9% Roma, 1.4% Ukrainians and 0.5% belonged to other groups. The denomination has 1,185 church buildings and some 340 pastors. It originates in the 19th century and is divided into six local conferences, standing for and named after some of the country's main historical regions: Banat, Northern Transylvania, Southern Transylvania, Moldavia, Muntenia and Oltenia.

== History ==
In 1868-69 Michał Belina-Czechowski, a former Roman Catholic priest who had embraced Adventism in the United States, arrived at Pitești and introduced Seventh-Day Adventist doctrines into Romania. Among the approximately 12 people he converted was Thomas G. Aslan, who later made contact with John Nevins Andrews and helped him prepare a Romanian-language paper. Visits in the mid-1880s from George I. Butler, president of the General Conference, and Augustin C. Bourdeau, an evangelist, followed these initial contacts. In 1890 Ludwig R. Conradi entered Transylvania, then part of Austria-Hungary, in search of converts. As a result of Conradi's efforts, by the mid-1890s several individuals in Cluj had converted to Adventism. Meanwhile, in 1892 Conradi organized several ethnic German Adventists who had recently moved from the Russian Empire to the Kingdom of Romania into a church. Eventually these Adventists settled in Viile Noi, a neighbourhood of Constanța.

Johann F. Ginter, an evangelist from Russia, moved to Bucharest in 1904 and soon converted several individuals, among them Peter Paulini (a medical student) and Ștefan Demetrescu (a Romanian Army officer), who then attended the Adventist training school in Möckern, Germany. By the time Paulini and Demetrescu returned to Romania, the government had expelled Ginter, but the newly trained Romanian Adventists were ready to take his place. Conferences organized beginning in 1907 and the Romanian Union Conference formed in 1919 with about 2,000 members. Starting in 1908 Romanian Adventists had their publications printed by the Hamburg press in Germany, but in 1920 they established the Adventist Publishing House in Bucharest. Three years later the Romanian Union Training School opened in Bucharest but moved to Diciosânmartin in 1926 and then Brașov in 1931. The Conference registered as a religious association in 1928, but during the period of Greater Romania, it functioned in semi-legality, sometimes permitted to function and at other times banned. In 1930 there were 7,700 (or 16,100) members, 65 ministers and 290 houses of prayer.

At the start of World War II, there were some 13,000 (or 25,000) Adventists in Romania. In 1941, as Nazi German troops entered Romania, the Wehrmacht confiscated the training school building and completely closed the institution the next year (see also Romania during World War II). At the end of that year the Antonescu regime closed all Adventist churches and imprisoned church leaders, but meetings continued in secret. The school (as well as the churches) opened again in 1944 and beginning in 1950 operated under the name Romanian Theological Seminary. Meanwhile, the publishing house closed in 1942, opening again in 1944 until taken over by the government three years later. In 1946, Adventists found homes for 600 orphans affected by that year's famine in Moldavia. Having gained provisional recognition that year, the church was one of the fourteen faiths to gain state recognition in the 1948 Law on Cults.

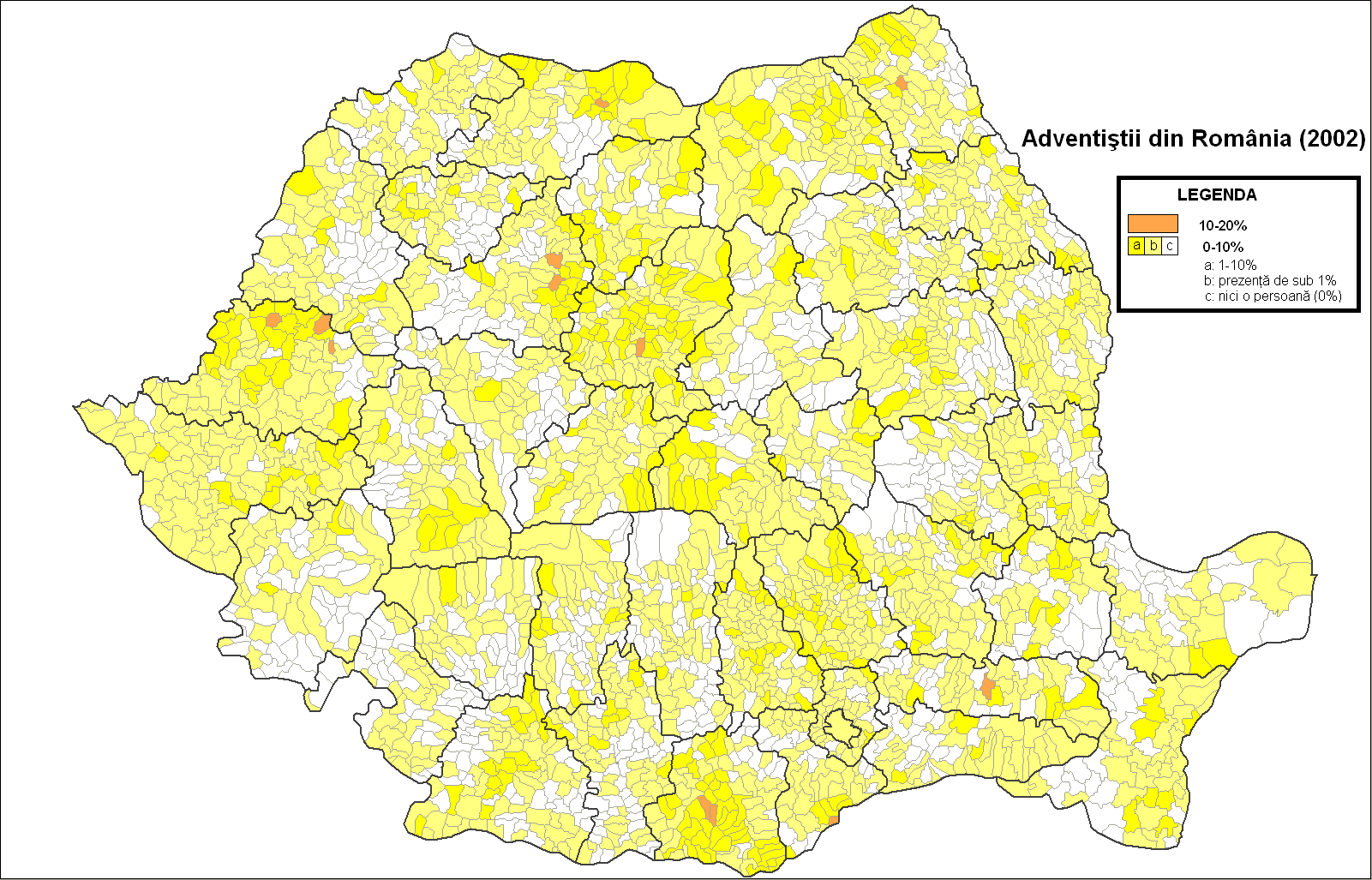
Adventists in Romania (2002 census)

Under Nicolae Ceaușescu, services (some of which were bilingual Romanian and Hungarian in Transylvania) continued to be well-attended, with catechetical classes held Friday evenings and Saturdays. There were occasional reports of members having difficulties because of their views, but the official community developed a form of accommodation with the state that was on the whole acceptable to the Communist authorities. The church leadership was reluctant to complain about state interference if it meant losing any of its "privileges", which included travel to conferences abroad by 1980. The international Adventist community, which has given careful attention to its churches in Romania, acquiesced in this posture, seeking to resolve problems as quietly and responsibly as possible, a strategy dating back to the 1930s. Individual members, though, went further sometimes: eight Adventists were arrested in summer 1979 for printing and distributing religious literature; the police stated they had printed 10,000 copies each of fourteen different titles, mainly on state presses. In 1985, Dorel Cataramă was sentenced to fourteen years' imprisonment for theft despite his factory's declaration that no property was missing. By late summer 1986, with four of Bucharest's nine Adventist churches demolished, some strain had come between official church and state (see Ceaușima). With the collapse of the Communist regime, a new publishing house opened in 1990 and the Romanian Adventist College of Health in 1991. Despite the wartime and Communist-era difficulties it experienced, Adventism had grown faster in Romania by this time than elsewhere in Europe, reaching some 70,000 members and over 500 church buildings by the early 1990s.

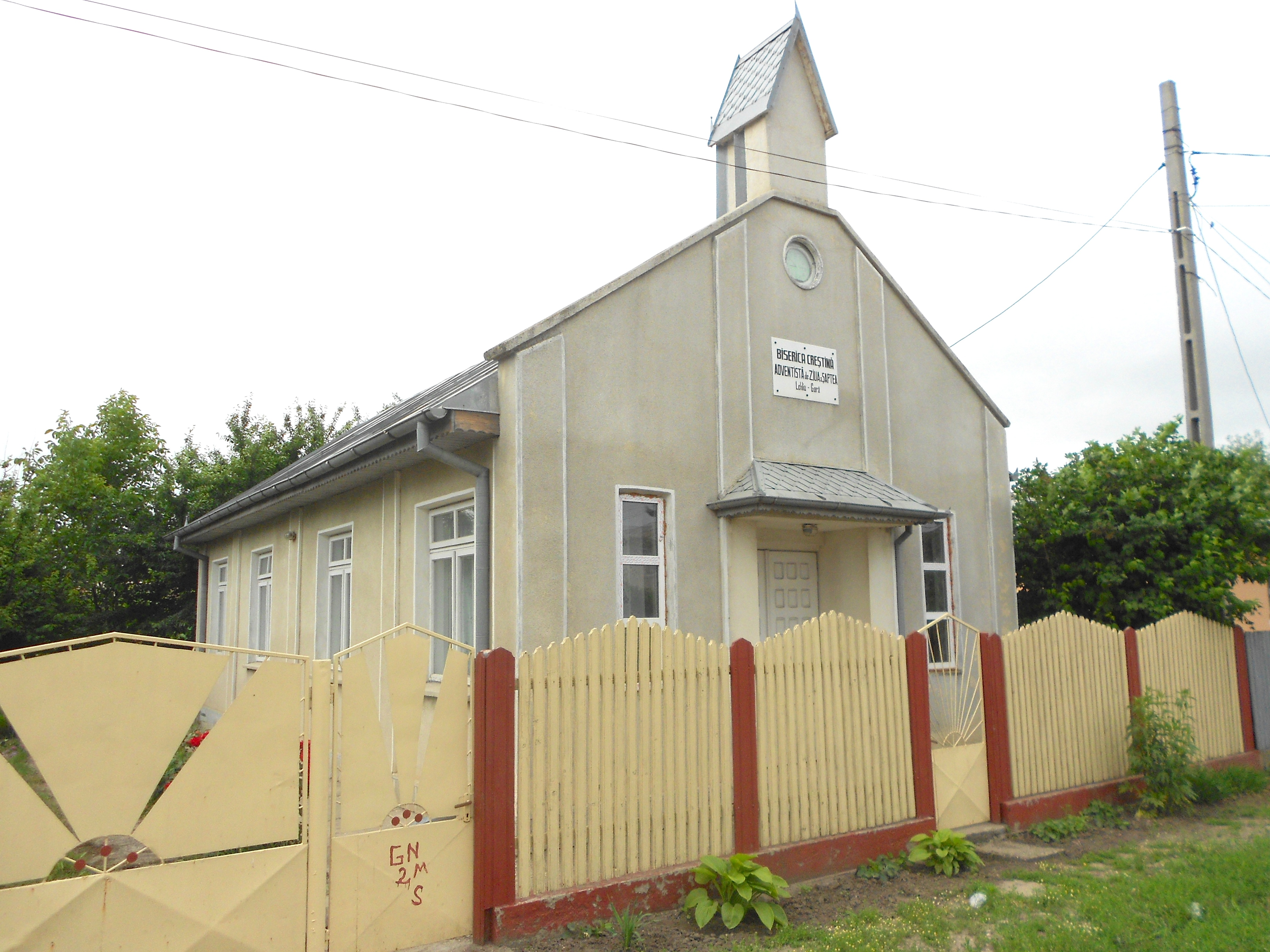
The Adventist church building in Lehliu Gară, Călărași County.

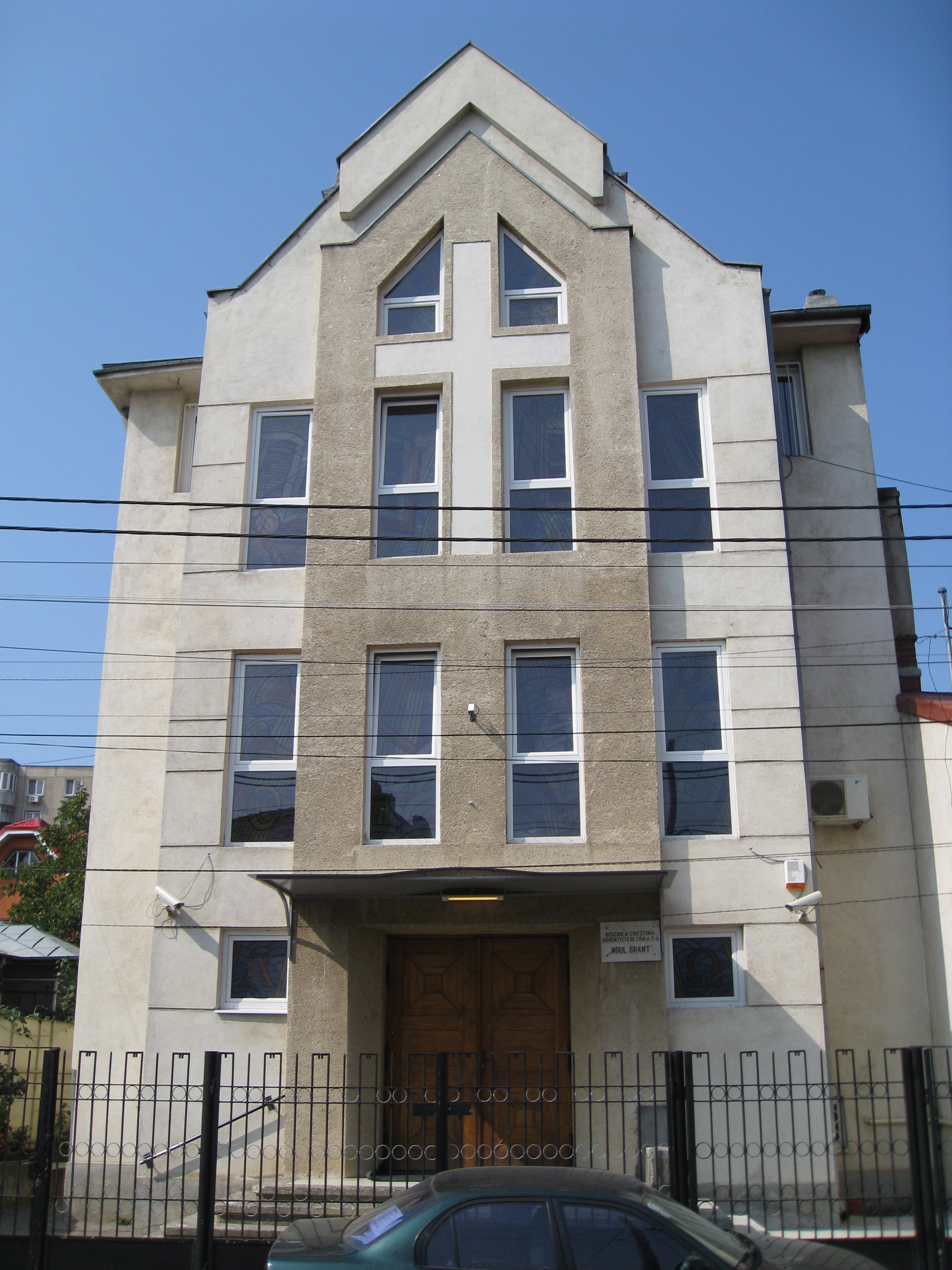
An Adventist church in Giulești, Bucharest

== Education ==
The church runs a university-level Adventist Theological Institute at Cernica, three high school-level seminaries and a post-secondary health school at Brăila. Several associations related to the church operate in Romania: the Adventist Development and Relief Agency, the Adventist Ministry to College and University Students, Health & Temperance and the Adventist Youth Society. Its radio station, Vocea Speranței ("The Voice of Hope"), broadcasts from Bucharest, Brașov, Constanța and Timișoara. Its publishing house produces the monthly magazine Curierul Adventist ("The Adventist Courier") and the religious-cultural bimonthly Semnele Timpului ("Signs of the Times"). Every three months, it emits some 55,000 copies of Bible study guides for adults, youth and children. It also prints theological works, informational pamphlets and school lessons.

== Associated denomination ==
A small but related group, the Reformed Adventists in Romania, originates in a schism brought about in early 20th-century United States. This church spread to Germany and reached Romania during World War I. Members, who are convinced they are living in the Last Days, object to oaths, military service, and reportedly marriage, probably because Saint Paul enjoins Christians to abstain from normal marital relations during the end times. They were involved in a confrontation with the Communist state (which declared them illegal in 1948) and the official church, to which they were an obvious embarrassment and whose leaders they felt very strongly were too closely linked with the regime.
