= Cambodia Adventist School =

Cambodia Adventist International School

Location
- 419 Street Rada, Phum Tum Nub; Khom Phnom Thmey; Khan Sen Sok, Phnom Penh; Cambodia

Information
- School type: Private
- Denomination: Seventh-day Adventist
- Established: 1995
- Principal: Dean Edwards (as of 2025)
- Faculty: 72
- Gender: Co-educational
- Enrollment: 500 (2023)
- Campus: 1
- Campus type: Urban
- Website: www.caisedu.com

Cambodia Adventist International School (CAIS) is a K-12 Christian, co-educational boarding school located in Khan Sen Sok, Phnom Penh, Cambodia. It is owned and operated by the Seventh-day Adventist Church.

It is a part of the Seventh-day Adventist education system, the world's second largest Christian school system.

== History ==
Cambodia Adventist International School is the only kindergarten through to 12th grade Seventh-day Adventist school accredited in Cambodia. The school began in 1995, and was previously called "Cambodia Adventist Primary School" (CAPS), but was changed a couple of years later. In 1995 it opened with two teachers and about 30 students in kindergarten through to 2nd grade. The next year it expanded to include K-5. Another grade was added each year until 2004 when the first class graduated. The elementary school was accredited in 2004 and the high school was given accreditation in 2005. CAS is taught in English and is a boarding school. As of 2005, Cambodia Adventist School has 21 teachers and 330 students.

== See also ==
- List of Seventh-day Adventist secondary and elementary schools
- Seventh-day Adventist education
- Seventh-day Adventist Church
- Seventh-day Adventist theology
- History of the Seventh-day Adventist Church
- Wat Preah Yesu
