= Edward Hilliard =

American missionary (1851–1936)

- Born: 3 April 1851; Madrid, St. Lawrence County, New York, US
- Died: 18 September 1936 (aged 85); Bangalore, Karnataka India
- Occupation: Seventh-day Adventist missionary
- Known for: Founded the Seventh-day Adventist Church in Tonga

Edward Hilliard (3 April 1851 – 18 September 1936) was a Seventh-day Adventist missionary from America who worked in Australia, India and Tonga. He was the first resident Seventh-day Adventist missionary on Tonga, and founded the Seventh-day Adventist Church in Tonga.

== Missionary ==
Edward Hilliard was born on 3 April 1851 in Madrid, St. Lawrence County, New York. His parents were converted to Adventism when he was a child, and he was brought up in that faith. He became an Adventist pastor. In 1895 the Mission Board sent him to Tonga, then called the Friendly Islands, as a missionary.

Hilliard arrived at Tongatapu on 30 August 1895 with his wife Ida Hilliard and their two-year-old daughter Alta. They lived in temporary quarters while Edward Hilliard built a four-room cottage. Around November 1895 Ida Hilliard began to teach school, first in their temporary home and then in their cottage. The number of pupils reached a peak of 28, each paying $3 per quarter. Hilliard built a small school room 4 by 7 metres (13 by 23 ft) near his cottage. The Hilliards brought two Tongan boys into their home to try to train them as missionaries. To earn extra income Hilliard worked part-time as a carpenter. He slowly learned the Tongan language and translated some tracts into this language. Hilliard's work was mainly limited to the small papalagi (European) colony on "the beach". He was no longer young and found the local language difficult.

In August 1896 Edwin Butz and his wife Florence arrived on the fifth voyage of the Pitcairn. They were accompanied by two Pitcairn Islanders, Sarah and Maria Young, descendants of Bounty mutineer, midshipman Ned Young. In 1897 Dr. Merritt Kellogg and Eleanor Kellogg joined them. In these early years the missionaries made little progress, in part handicapped by their dietary regulations. Drinking kava and eating pork are important in Tongan social life but are prohibited by the Adventists. Before Hilliard left Tonga in 1899 he reported that a Sabbath School with 31 members met regularly. Most of the attendees were the missionaries and the school children. The children's parents only attended occasionally. On 10 September 1899, shortly before leaving Tonga, Hilliard gathered the missionaries into his home and organized them into a church. The Butz and Kellogg families were the charter members.

== Later years ==
After four years in Tonga the Hilliards moved to Australia for eight years, then spent thirteen years in Tasmania. Sarah Young accompanied the Hilliards to Australia where she completed her training as a nurse. A young part-Tongan called David or Horace Holland also sailed to Australia with the Hilliards, and studied at Avondale College from 1900–01. He was baptized, but later broke the school's rule and left.

In 1928 Hilliard moved to Bangalore, India with his wife, daughter and son-in-law Pastor Christiansen. Hilliard suffered from heart disease. He died in Bangalore on 18 September 1936, aged 85. The Hobart Seventh-Day Adventist school near Hobart, Tasmania was renamed on 1 September 1994 to the Hilliard Christian School in honor of Edward Hilliard, who had led the Seventh-day Adventist church in Tasmania for four years.

== Sources ==
- Cousens, Eli (2001-09-07). "Values still count" (PDF). The Mercury. Archived from the original (PDF) on 2015-03-20.
- Garrett, John (1992). Footsteps in the Sea: Christianity in Oceania to World War II. editorips@usp.ac.fj. ISBN 978-982-02-0068-5.
- Hook, Milton (2007). TALAFEKAU MO'ONI – EARLY ADVENTISM IN TONGA AND NIUE (PDF). South Pacific Division Department of Education. Archived from the original (PDF) on 2015-03-24.
- Iskander, Elizabeth (2014-05-29). "AGENDA FOR GC '15: LEADERSHIP ON THE DATE LINE SABBATH". AD Vindicate. Archived from the original on 2015-04-06.
- Mookerjee, L. G. (15 October 1936). "Pastor E. Hilliard" (PDF). Eastern Tidings. 21 (10). Poona.
- Steley, Dennis (1989), Unfinished: The Seventh-day Adventist Mission in the South Pacific, Excluding Papus New Guinea, 1886 - 1986 (Thesis), University of Auckland
