= Edwin Butz =

American missionary (1864–1956)

Edwin Sebastian Butz
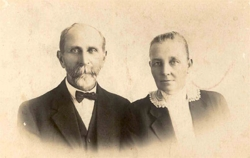
- Edwin Sebastian Butz and Florence Butz c. 1914
- Born: 1864; US
- Died: July 1956 (aged 91–92); Melbourne, Australia
- Occupation: Missionary

Edwin Sebastian Butz (1864 – July 1956) was a Seventh-day Adventist (SDA) missionary who was active in Oceania and in Australia.

== Missionary career ==
Edwin Sebastian Butz was born in 1864 in the United States. In 1895 he came to the South Pacific with his wife Florence and daughter Alma on the third voyage of the SDA schooner Pitcairn. They served first on Pitcairn Island, then in the early days of the Adventist mission in Tonga. They arrived in Tonga on 29 September 1896 with Sarah and Maria Young, two nursing trainees from Pitcairn Island. There they joined the first SDA missionaries, Edward Hilliard and his wife Ida, who had arrived the previous year. The Butz's initially had difficulty being accepted, as they were Americans and most Europeans in Tonga were British. This was eased by Florence Butz's provision of medical services.

The Butz's tried to establish a permanent mission, but were mainly limited to working with the small papalagi (European) colony. They made sporadic missionary efforts in the islands of Haʻapai and Tongatapu. In June 1899 the Pitcairn again visited, bringing a small prefabricated building that was used at first as a mission home and as a chapel. After 18 months it was taken apart and rebuilt as the small Nukuʻalofa church, 5 by 10 metres (16 by 33 ft). The Butz's were taken to Vavaʻu on the Pitcairn, since it was thought that there were too many missionaries at Nuku'alofa, but they returned after the Hilliards left later in 1899.

In 1901 Butz attended the General Conference of the Seventh-day Adventists in Battle Creek College, where he was ordained to the ministry. In Tonga Butz recognized but failed to address the language problem. He said the Tongans were very interested in learning English. Until 1905 at least half of the pupils at the Adventist schools were European, or partly European, and the lessons were given in English. The Butz family left Tonga on 27 December 1905. In ten years Butz had baptized two Tongans and twelve Europeans.

== Australia ==
Butz accepted an invitation to move to Australia in 1906. He was president of the South Australia conference and the Tasmania conference, then in 1914 was appointed president of the Queensland Conference in succession to Charles H. Watson. Around the end of 1915 Butz publicly criticized some of the ministers in Queensland. He was rebuked for this by the Conference Executive Committee, but refused to apologize. Faced with the threatened resignations of several members of the committee, Butz resigned.

Butz was later president of the Western Australian and North New Zealand conferences. For several years in the early 1920s he was preceptor and teacher of Bible and Physiology at Avondale College. The Butz’s retired to Melbourne. On 14 February 1929 Pastor and Mrs. Edwin S. Butz touched at Pitcairn on the passenger liner Remuera I, bound from Wellington to Southampton, after a 34-year absence. Edwin Butz died in July 1956 and Florence Butz in March 1957.

== See also ==
- General Conference of Seventh-day Adventists
- Seventh-day Adventist Church
- Ellen G. White
- Adventist
- Seventh-day Adventist eschatology
- Seventh-day Adventist theology
- Seventh-day Adventist worship
- History of the Seventh-day Adventist Church
- 28 fundamental beliefs
- Questions on Doctrine
- Teachings of Ellen White#End times
- Inspiration of Ellen White
- Prophecy in the Seventh-day Adventist Church
- Investigative judgment
- Pillars
- Seventh-day Adventist Church Pioneers

== Sources ==
- "Butz, Edwin Sebastian". South Queensland Adventist Heritage. Archived from the original on 2015-02-28.
- Ford, Herbert (2012-03-14). Pitcairn Island as a Port of Call: A Record, 1790-2010, 2d ed. McFarland. ISBN 978-0-7864-8822-3.
- Garrett, John (1992). Footsteps in the Sea: Christianity in Oceania to World War II. editorips@usp.ac.fj. ISBN 978-982-02-0068-5.
- Hook, Milton (2007). TALAFEKAU MO'ONI – EARLY ADVENTISM IN TONGA AND NIUE (PDF). South Pacific Division Department of Education. Archived from the original (PDF) on 2015-03-24.
- Steley, Dennis (1989), Unfinished: The Seventh-day Adventist Mission in the South Pacific, Excluding Papus New Guinea, 1886 - 1986 (Thesis), University of Auckland
