= John Tay =

American missionary (1832–1892)

John I. Tay
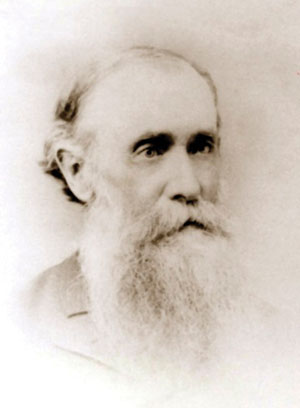
- Born: 1832
- Died: 8 January 1892 (aged 59–60); Suva, Fiji
- Occupations: Ship's carpenter, Missionary

John I. Tay (1832 – 8 January 1892) was a Seventh-day Adventist missionary who was known for his pioneering work in the South Pacific. It was through his efforts that most of the inhabitants of Pitcairn Island were converted to Adventism, and that the General Conference of Seventh-day Adventists purchased the Pitcairn schooner for missionary work in the South Pacific.

== Early life ==
John I. Tay was born in 1832. He went to sea when he was sixteen. Tay served on the U.S. sloop-of-war USS Housatonic during the American Civil War (1861–65). He settled in Oakland, California after the war, and joined the Adventists in 1873. He married a woman named Hannah and built a house in Oakland. He worked to spread the Adventist message on the ships in Oakland harbor. He had been given the book The Mutineers of the Bounty by his mother when he went to sea, heard more of Pitcairn Island from a shipmate on the Housatonic who had visited the island, and heard yet more from the captain of the Ocean King whom he met in Oakland harbor. All this made him want to visit the island.

== First visit to Pitcairn ==
By 1886 Tay was in poor health, and was advised by his doctor to take a sea voyage. Tay sailed to Tahiti on the Tropic Bird as ship's carpenter. He left San Francisco on 1 July 1886 and reached Tahiti on 29 July 1886. After waiting less than two months, he obtained passage for Pitcairn on HMS Pelican. This was a British man-of-war. Tay reached Pitcairn Island on 18 October 1886, and stayed until the last week of November. At the time Pitcairn was inhabited by descendants of the mutineers on HMS Bounty. The islanders were already familiar with Adventist concepts, as they had received a box of Adventist tracts about ten years earlier. In five weeks Tay converted the whole population to Adventism. He was unable to perform baptisms since he was not ordained, but promised to return with a minister.

Tay left the island on 20 November 1886 on the 14-ton yacht General Evans, bound for Tahiti. While waiting for a ship to carry him back to San Francisco, he wrote a letter to a friend that was used for a story by the San Francisco Chronicle. The newspaper wrote "[S]o successful was he [Tay], as he claims, in his efforts to convince people there [at Pitcairn] that Saturday, the seventh day of the week, is the true and divinely appointed Sabbath, that the entire community determined to observe Saturday as their Sabbath in the future.... While at Pitcairn's Island, Mr. Tay was the guest of their head man [Simon Young], who visited this city a few years ago. He was then a very strict Sunday Sabbatarian."

== Later missionary activity ==
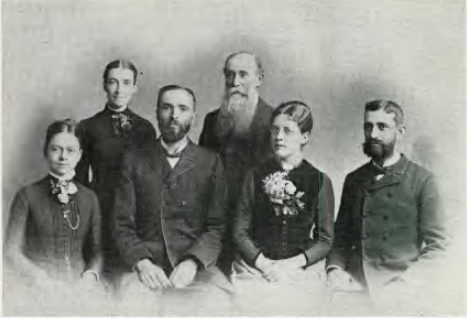
Elder and Mrs. Edward Gates (left), Elder and Mrs. Albert Read (right), Mr. and Mrs. John Tay (standing)

Based on Tay's report after his return, the General Conference of the Seventh-day Adventists sent a mission to Pitcairn. The Schooner Phoebe Chapman left Honolulu on 31 July 1888 with the Adventist pastor E.J. Cudney on board. The plan was to stop at Tahiti to pick up John I. Tay, then continue to Pitcairn Island where Cudney could perform the promised baptisms. However, the Phoebe Chapman was lost at sea without trace, and John Tay returned from Tahiti to the US.

The General Conference eventually paid for a ship to be built for missionary expeditions in the South Pacific. After a fund raising campaign, the 90 foot (27 m) schooner Pitcairn was purchased for US$12,000 in 1890. The Pitcairn reached Pitcairn Island on 25 November 1890 bringing Tay and his wife with the elders Gates and Read and their wives. On 26 November 1890 the British ship Troop, traveling from Oregon to Cardiff, spoke to the Pitcairn and was then boarded by Tay and about 20 islanders, who sold the captain fruit and vegetables. On 28 November 1890 the iron sailing ship Renee Rickmers of Bremerhaven was approaching Pitcairn Island when she saw the schooner, mistook it for a pirate, and rapidly stood out to sea to escape.

During the schooner's three-week stay, 82 Pitcairn islanders were baptized. After this the Pitcairn sailed onward to other Pacific Islands. It carried three Pitcairn islanders as missionary helpers: James Russell McCoy, his sister Mary McCoy and Heywood Christian. Tay arrived in Fiji with a cargo of "literature, beans and dried fruit." He was the first Seventh-day Adventist missionary to work on Fiji. The Pitcairn left him at Suva, Fiji, on 21 September 1891 and sailed for Norfolk Island. Tay died at Suva of influenza on 8 January 1892.

== Sources ==
- Finau, Makisi; Leuti, Teeruro; Langi, Jione (1992). Island Churches: Challenge and Change. University of the South Pacific - Institute of Pacific Studies. ISBN 978-982-02-0077-7.
- Ford, Herbert (2011). "The Good Ship Pitcairn". Pacific Union College.
- Ford, Herbert (2012-03-14). Pitcairn Island as a Port of Call: A Record, 1790-2010, 2d ed. McFarland. ISBN 978-0-7864-8822-3.
- Fortin, Denis; Moon, Jerry (2014-04-08). The Ellen G. White Encyclopedia. Review and Herald Pub Assoc. ISBN 978-0-8127-5662-3.
- Garrett, John (1992). Footsteps in the Sea: Christianity in Oceania to World War II. editorips@usp.ac.fj. ISBN 978-982-02-0068-5.
- Harder, Fred M. (Summer 1979). "Pitcairn: Ship and Symbol" (PDF). Adventist Heritage. 6 (1).
- IBP USA (2013-08-01). Pitcairn Islands Business Law Handbook. Int'l Business Publications. ISBN 978-1-4387-7079-6.
- Land, Gary (2014-10-23). Historical Dictionary of the Seventh-Day Adventists. Rowman & Littlefield Publishers. ISBN 978-1-4422-4188-6.
- Mokgwane, Pako (2012). "Our First Adventist Missionary to the South Pacific Islands". General Conference of Seventh-day Adventists. Archived from the original on 2012-11-19.
- "The Mission Schooner Pitcairn". New Zealand Herald. XXVIII (8695). 1891-10-12.
- Young, Rosalind A. (1894a). "XXII The Arrival of Mr. John I. Tay". Mutiny of the Bounty and Story of Pitcairn Island, 1790-1894. Pacific Press Publishing Company. Archived from the original on 2016-03-04.
- Young, Rosalind A. (1894b). "XXIII The Missionary Ship Pitcairn". Mutiny of the Bounty and Story of Pitcairn Island, 1790-1894. Pacific Press Publishing Company. Archived from the original on 2016-03-04.
