= Cessnock Airport =

- IATA: CES; ICAO: YCNK

Summary
- Owner: Cessnock City Council
- Operator: Cessnock City Council
- Serves: Cessnock
- Location: Cessnock, New South Wales, Australia
- Elevation AMSL: 211 ft (64 m)
- Coordinates: 32°47′18″S 151°20′30″E

Map
- Location in New South Wales

Runways
Direction	Length		Surface
Direction	m	ft	Surface
17/35	1,097	3,599	Asphalt
- Sources: AIP

Cessnock Airport (IATA: CES, ICAO: YCNK) is a civil airport located 6 km (4 mi) North of Cessnock, New South Wales, Australia.

== History ==
Built by the Department of Main Roads during World War II named as RAAF Base Pokolbin, as part of a system of parent and satellite aerodromes proposed throughout New South Wales. The aerodrome was known as RAAF Station Pokolbin and was constructed on Commonwealth grounds. The aerodrome had two runways 5,000 by 160 ft (1,524 by 49 m) wide side by side. Principal works undertaken with approximate quantities were: Clearing & grubbing – 148 ha; Earthworks – 3876 cu.m.; Formation & trimming – 277,306 sq.m.; Formation of taxiways – 6040 m; Gravelling of runways – 159,856 sq.m. Gravelling of taxiways and hideouts – 66,560 sq.m.; Tar surfacing – 115,315 sq.m.; and Pipe and stone drains – 4512 m. After the war in 1948, the Aerodrome was renamed to Cessnock Airport.

The aerodrome was proposed to have the following satellite aerodromes, Glendon, Rothbury and Weston, however, Rothbury and Weston do not appear to have been constructed. In 1992, the North - South airstrip was gifted by the Commonwealth to the airport. By 1999, the airport was operated by an independent lease. The council subsequently gained back ownership of Cessnock Airport in December 2011, which had stayed the same since.

== Accidents ==
There was an aircraft crash with a light airplane in 2024; the pilot was taken to hospital.

== See also ==
- List of airports in New South Wales
