= Sydney Adventist Hospital =

Private Hospital in Wahroonga, New South Wales, Australia

- Seventh-day Adventist
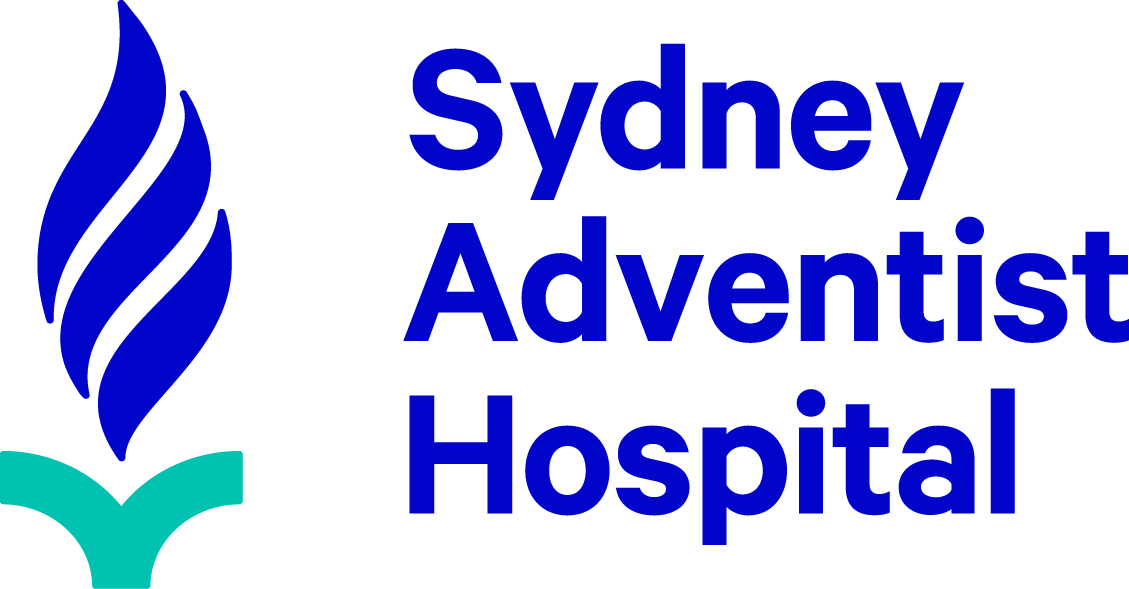

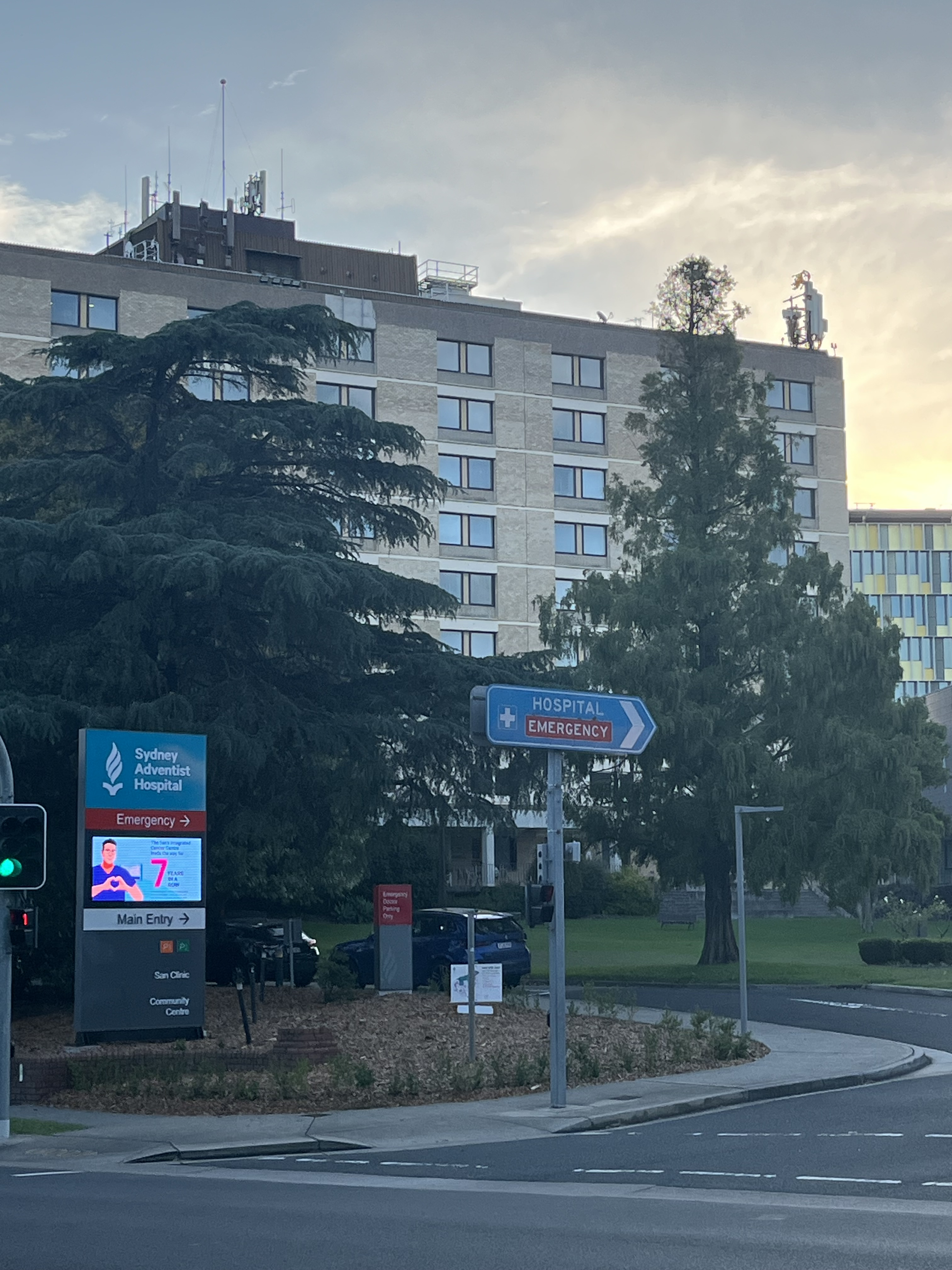
- The hospital in March 2025

Geography
- Location: Wahroonga, Sydney, New South Wales, Australia
- Coordinates: 33.7335°S 151.0997°E

Organisation
- Care system: Private
- Type: Christian, Not-for-profit
- Affiliated university: Avondale University; Sydney Medical School

Services
- Emergency department: Yes
- Beds: 550

Helipads
- Helipad: ICAO: YXSA
Number	Length		Surface
Number	ft	m	Surface
1			grass

History
- Founded: 1903

Links
- Website: www.sah.org.au
- Lists: Hospitals in Australia

Sydney Adventist Hospital, commonly known as the San, is a large private hospital on the Upper North Shore region of Sydney, New South Wales, Australia, located on Fox Valley Road in Wahroonga. Established on 1 January 1903, as a not-for-profit organisation, it was originally named the Sydney Sanitarium from which its colloquial name was derived. The hospital is operated by the Seventh-day Adventist Church, whose South Pacific Division headquarters are located in the immediate vicinity of the San. The hospital offers a broad range of acute medical, surgical, diagnostic, outpatient, support and wellness services, including Executive Health Checks at the Fox Valley Medical & Dental Centre.

As a not-for-profit health care facility, 2,200 staff and 700 accredited medical officers provide services for more than 50,000 inpatients and over 160,000 outpatients annually at the San.

The hospital is the base for the nursing course offered by Avondale University.

== History ==
Sydney Sanitarium was founded by American missionary and physician Lauretta E. Kress. It opened in Wahroonga on 1 January 1903 with a bed capacity of 70 and was known as a ‘home of health’ and as a place where people learned to stay well. The original Hospital building was designed by Dr Merritt Kellogg, brother of Dr John Harvey Kellogg. The Sanitarium became widely known as the ‘San’, and today, many years after its 1973 official name change to Sydney Adventist Hospital, it is still colloquially referred to as ‘the San’ Hospital.

The hospital was rebuilt in 1973 and became an acute care institution. Today, with 494 licensed overnight beds, it is the largest single campus private hospital in NSW and was the first private hospital in NSW to be accredited by the Australian Council on Healthcare Standards.

In 1986 the Hospital formalised their outreach work in third world countries amongst disadvantaged sick men, women and children by launching the HealthCare Outreach (HCO) Program with the Operation Open Heart inaugural trip to Tonga. Since then almost 100 HCO trips to 13 countries have been made with over 2,850 surgeries performed. In 2007 the 21st anniversary of the first trip was celebrated. Surgeries have now been expanded to cover cleft palate defect repair, orthopaedic surgery, burns scar contracture repair, and uterine prolapse.

In 2005 the hospital in the Home program commenced at the San. In 2006 the San won the prestigious national Australian Private Hospital Award for Clinical Excellence (70 beds and over). The San also become home to the Southern Hemisphere's first Dual Source Computerised Tomography Scanner in the same year.

In 2020 during the COVID-19 pandemic, the hospital used a $125,000 robot called "Thor" to fight off bugs by sanitising rooms.

== Services and facilities ==
Sydney Adventist Hospital offers acute surgical, medical and obstetric care. Services include:

- Cardiac, including cardiac catheterisation and complex cardiac surgery, diagnostic services and rehabilitation
- Orthopaedics, including joint reconstruction and replacement surgery
- Maternity, including Special Care Nursery facilities
- Cancer, including surgery and treatment for numerous types of cancer, chemotherapy and radiotherapy, palliative care, and cancer support services
- Urology, including a full range of medical and surgical treatments for men, women and children
- Other Surgical Specialties, including Neurosurgery, General, Vascular, Colorectal, Gastrointestinal, Ophthalmic, Oral & Dental, Plastic & Cosmetic, and Paediatric surgery
- Other Medical Specialties, including Neurology, General, Respiratory, Sleep, Paediatric (including the Children's Sleep Disorders Unit), Endocrinology, and Gastrointestinal medicine
- Emergency Care, the largest and busiest private unit in NSW

SAH also offers a large range of outpatient services, including physiotherapy, cardiac rehabilitation, pathology, radiology, ultrasound (including San Ultrasound for Women), nuclear medicine, wound care, radiation oncology, dietitian services, and an on-site family medical and dental centre.

== See also ==
- List of Seventh-day Adventist hospitals
