= Bourdeau brothers =

Canadian Seventh-day Adventist ministers

Augustin Cornelius (7 March 1834 – 1916) and Daniel T. (28 December 1835 – 1905) Bourdeau were Seventh-day Adventist ministers who helped establish the church in Quebec, Canada.

== Biography ==
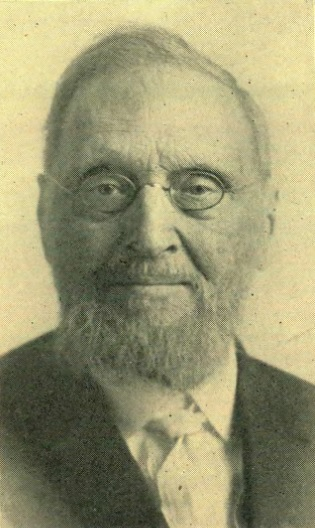
Augustin C. Bourdeau

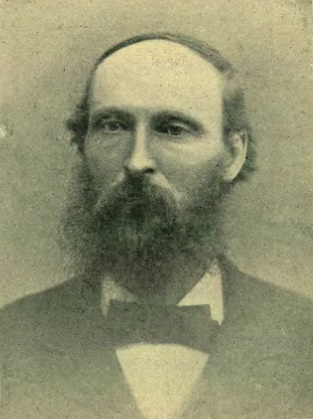
Daniel T. Bourdeau

Augustin was born in Saint Armand, Lower Canada, while his parents were visiting friends; Daniel was born in Enosburg Falls, Vermont. Their parents, Augustin and Sarah A. Bourdeau, were born in Canada and raised in northern Vermont. Initially members of a Baptist church, they were working as preachers when they converted to Adventism in 1856. Augustine was baptized and ordained to the Adventist ministry in 1857; Daniel the year after that. They then worked as self-supporting preachers for several years among the French-speaking people of Quebec and Vermont.

In 1862 Augustin helped organize the Vermont Conference; later he worked in the American Midwest and in Quebec, where he served as president of the Quebec Conference. He went to Europe in 1884, returned to the United States in 1888, and continued evangelizing in several states as well as Canada.

In 1868 Daniel went to California, where he worked with John Norton Loughborough until 1870. Evangelizing French-speakers, he established churches in Wisconsin and Illinois in 1873. In 1876 he joined John Nevins Andrews for a year in Switzerland where he edited papers and carried out evangelism, also attempting to win over followers in Italy and France. In 1883 he returned to Europe, where Augustin joined him a year later, and worked in France, Switzerland, and Italy. Returning to the United States in 1887, he continued his work as an evangelist.

Augustin's wife was named Charlotte; Daniel married Marion Saxby in 1861.

== See also ==
- Seventh-day Adventist Church
- Seventh-day Adventist theology
- Seventh-day Adventist eschatology
- History of the Seventh-day Adventist Church
- Teachings of Ellen White
- Inspiration of Ellen White
- Prophecy in the Seventh-day Adventist Church
- Investigative judgment
- The Pillars of Adventism
- Second Advent
- Baptism by Immersion
- Conditional Immortality
- Historicism
- Three Angels' Messages
- End times
- Sabbath in Seventh-day Adventism
- Ellen G. White
- Adventist
- Seventh-day Adventist Church Pioneers
- Seventh-day Adventist worship
