= Creation Seventh Day Adventist Church =

Christian religious group

The Official CSDA Logo

The Creation Seventh Day (and) Adventist Church began as a small group that broke off from the Seventh-day Adventist Church in 1988, and organized its own church in 1991. It has been involved in court cases with the General Conference of Seventh-day Adventists over trademarks and internet domain names.

== History ==
The Creation Seventh Day Adventists broke away from the official Seventh-day Adventist church in 1988, because of doctrinal disagreements; specifically, as a response to the acquisition and enforcing of a trademark regarding the name "Seventh-day Adventist" on other believers outside of the denominational umbrella. In 2012, there was a United States congregation located in Guys, Tennessee, and a church house in the country of Uganda as a result of missionary efforts in Africa.

=== Litigation ===
==== WIPO ruling on disputed domain names ====
On May 23, 2006, the World Intellectual Property Organization (WIPO) Arbitration and Mediation Center received notice from the General Conference of Seventh-day Adventists regarding several domain names operated by the Creation Seventh Day Adventist Church. The defendant claimed that such a confiscation of web domains would be a violation of religious freedom. In the decision rendered on July 21, 2006, WIPO concluded that although "Respondent alleges that he is involved in the free dissemination of the gospel of Jesus Christ and not in commercial activity..." and disclaimers were posted on the domains in question, "persons interested in finding religious information are Internet users and consumers within the meaning of the Policy." They further concluded several of the church's domain names to be infringing on the trademark held by the General Conference, and based on these conclusions, WIPO ordered "that the Domain Names be transferred to Complainant."

==== U.S. federal trademark lawsuit ====
The General Conference filed a lawsuit against the Creation Seventh Day Adventist Church in 2006, with Walter McGill as the defendant. McGill's defense cited the Free Exercise Clause, the fact that the church's name had never been used in commerce, and the lack of any actual confusion over the course of the church's fifteen-year history. He later added the Religious Freedom Restoration Act in support of his Free Exercise claim, citing that the use of the name "Creation Seventh Day Adventist" was mandated by his religion. The jury trial was initially rescheduled from January 2008 to June, but was further delayed. In the interim, on June 11, the Tennessee district court judge issued a partial summary judgment on behalf of the plaintiff that the name "Seventh-day Adventist" could not be used in the promotion of the church's materials or services at any locality in the United States, despite the Judge's conclusion that the Church sincerely believed that it took the name as a result of divine revelation with no intent to confuse or deceive the public. As of May 27, 2009, a recommendation for permanent injunction was adopted by the Court against McGill and the Church enjoining them from using the names "Seventh-day Adventist," "Seventh-day," "Adventist," or the acronym "SDA" either alone or in conjunction with modifying terms, with an order to submit a sworn notice of compliance to the Court by June 17, 2009. No compliance report was filed. In August 2009, an appellant brief was filed by the Creation Seventh Day Adventist Church in the Court of Appeals for the Sixth Circuit. On November 21 attorneys representing the General Conference of Seventh-day Adventists submitted a Proposed Order of Contempt and Sanctions to the Court, seeking among other things the arrest of Pastor McGill pending his compliance, the dispatch of U.S. Marshals to the CSDA Church property to destroy signs and materials containing the terms banned under the injunction, the cost of attorney's fees, the authority to conduct an inquisition into others aside from Pastor McGill involved in managing the Church's websites, and the removal of all such websites. On December 14, Magistrate Judge Bryant issued a report and recommendation to the Court adopting much of the Conference's wording, but advising against the use of U.S. Marshals for the destruction of the Church's signs and materials in favor of having it done by the Plaintiffs themselves or their agents. Judge Breen adopted the recommended order in full on January 6, 2010, further authorizing the confiscation of several websites and domains registered either by the Church or suspected associates, including several not in violation of the injunction. On February 16, the order was enforced by a sign crew and a constable at the Guys property, amid protests from members and supporters. On March 8 the main signs were repainted by the Church, which the General Conference responded to with a motion for a contempt hearing, scheduled to be held on May 25. Lucan Chartier, the assistant pastor of the Guys congregation, testified to his involvement in the repainting of the signs and maintenance of Church websites, further answering when questioned that he would continue to do so because he "has no option but to continue doing what my religion dictates." On June 26, the Judge filed his report and recommendation to find both Mr. Chartier and Pastor McGill in contempt of court for disobeying the Court order in repainting the Church signs, maintaining websites, and editing the Wikipedia entry describing the movement. On August 10, the Court of Appeals handed down their judgment affirming the ruling of the District Court, concluding that while the ruling substantially burdens Pastor McGill's religious convictions, religious liberty laws were inapplicable in property disputes, with trademark law under that category as intellectual property. They further defined the RFRA as applying only to cases in which the Federal Government is a direct party, not cases in which a private party seeks to enforce Federal laws against another. In so ruling, the Court sided against a prior Second Circuit Court of Appeals ruling concluding the opposite, siding instead with the previous dissenting opinion of then-Judge Sonia Sotomayor. On November 8, a petition for certiorari was filed with the Supreme Court of the United States, focusing on a portion of the Sixth Circuit's decision rejecting the defendant's claim that the RFRA's protection against religious beliefs being burdened applies to this case. The petition referenced disagreements between various Courts of Appeal on this matter, pointing out that while the Fifth and Seventh Circuits are in agreement with the Sixth Circuit in this regard, others, such as the Eighth and DC Circuits have in fact applied the RFRA to similar cases involving only private parties. The Rutherford Institute filed an amicus curiae brief with the Supreme Court on February 11, 2011, arguing that the case should be heard and the RFRA's protections defined as applicable to civil suits such as employment discrimination claims, intellectual property disputes, and bankruptcy proceedings. On April 18, the Supreme Court denied the petition. A second Report and Recommendation was filed on December 16 advising that McGill and Chartier both be placed into custody of the U.S. Marshals Service and required to serve thirty-day sentences in addition to a $500.00 fine. Overruling objections by both Chartier and McGill, Judge Bryant adopted the R&R and modified it in part on April 5, authorizing warrants for the arrest of both McGill and Chartier by the U.S. Marshals Service.

=== Arrests and incarceration ===
Pastor McGill was arrested in Loma Linda, California on July 13, 2012, two days before he intended to turn himself in at the location, and was incarcerated in the San Bernardino County prison. On July 31, 2012, Chartier surrendered himself to San Bernardino County sheriff's deputies, and was incarcerated in the same location as McGill following a 20-minute press conference held before a group of reporters. McGill was held for thirty days before being released on August 11, 2012, during which time he engaged in a liquid-only fast. Upon his release, he expressed the intention to continue this fast another 10 days "to emulate a 40-day fast by Jesus." Chartier was released after ten days, on August 9, having also engaged in a similar fast, subsisting only on "water, along with some milk and the juice squeezed from oranges he sometimes had for breakfast." Both have indicated their intention to continue to maintain the name Creation Seventh Day Adventist for their religion, even if this means returning to jail in the future.

=== Petitions and walk across America ===
In the aftermath of their arrest and incarceration, McGill and Chartier launched an online petition in an attempt to convince the General Conference Corporation of Seventh-day Adventists to withdraw its lawsuit. Regarding their potential response to this effort, McGill stated in an interview with McNairy County publication Independent Appeal, "We're hoping that if enough people sign the petition to give us freedom of religion in America that perhaps they would see that it's better for their image to just let this thing go." During an interview with The Jackson Sun later that month, Chartier stated that, "We cannot stop practicing our faith, and the court cannot ignore us violating their order. The only way for this to be resolved is for the Seventh-day Adventist Church to stop asking the court to imprison us." In a September 2013 interview with Independent Appeal, McGill stated his intention to walk across the United States from coast to coast in 2014. His stated reasons for this walk, in addition to gathering hard-copy signatures for their religious liberty petition, are to raise awareness for "a new birth of freedom and integrity, restoring self-respect, family values, liberty of conscience, and victorious living while observing the universal principles of God's laws of physical, mental and spiritual health." According to the interview, he received a largely positive response from both individuals and city officials during a preliminary trip by car throughout which he mapped his anticipated route. McGill's walk officially launched on April 23, 2014 at Kill Devil Hills, North Carolina, and was completed on April 29, 2015 at the Santa Monica Pier in Santa Monica, California after traveling a route of over 3,200 miles. His website dedicated to the walk, walkthewalknow.com, indicates an extensive list of causes that were promoted, including: civil liberties, human rights, national integrity, the restoration of individual and corporate self-respect, support for traditional family values, liberty of conscience for all citizens, the defense of constitutional principles, the review and appreciation of American heritage, care for the poor and homeless, the promotion of naturopathy, employment of the Golden Rule in daily living, and a spiritual awakening for the healing of the country.

== Doctrinal positions ==
Church House in Guys, TN, 2006

The group holds to certain mainstream Adventist beliefs, such as the observance of the seventh day Sabbath, avoiding unclean meats, death as a sleep, the investigative judgment, and an imminent Second Coming of Christ. Alongside these are several more notable doctrines, such as the following. While differing from modern Seventh-day Adventists on the matters listed below, their doctrines regarding religious accountability, rejecting the Trinity, separation of Church and State, and victory over all known sins were practiced and observed by early prominent Adventist leaders.

=== Victory over sin ===
The CSDA Church teaches an experience of complete victory over known sins for the born again believer. The CSDA Church teaches that when an individual is born again, the Spirit of Christ comes to dwell in them in place of the nature of the “old man,” which they consider to be dead. The result of this union is taught to be a complete conformity to the will of God as revealed in a life lived free from all known sins. CSDAs believe in free will and are quick to differentiate between their beliefs and the doctrine of once saved always saved (OSAS) in that, while the OSAS doctrine teaches that a man is saved regardless of his actions, the victory over sin doctrine teaches an actual ceasing from the wrong actions themselves as a result of being saved from sin. In some ways the victory over sin doctrine is similar to that taught by reformer John Wesley regarding the new birth, however it differs in that, while Wesley believed that a person could not commit sin while in a vacillating state known as “being born of God,” the CSDA Church teaches that this is a one-time event with a subsequently permanent state, the result being that a born again Christian by definition will not commit known sin at any time. The CSDA Church believes this was presented to the Seventh-day Adventist denomination in 1888 under the name "Righteousness by Faith," by elders A. T. Jones and E. J. Waggoner, but rejected by the leading men of the General Conference despite strong endorsement from Ellen G. White.

=== Rejection of the Trinity doctrine ===
While not a test of fellowship, the CSDA Church generally considers the doctrine of the Trinity as an error. They believe that the Father and Son are two distinct and separate beings which each may be referred to by the Hebrew term El, translated as God in the Old Testament, or collectively by the plural Elohim, also translated as God. They reject the idea of the Holy Spirit as a person in the same sense as the Father and Son, believing it to be the shared essence, power, characteristics, presence, and personality of those two. They believe that it is by sharing the same Spirit that the Father and Son are referred to as "one", and that it is in this same way that Christ and the believer are "one". They also see this shared Holy Spirit as being the means of unity between believers, citing several passages from John 17. While they believe that the Son fulfills a submissive and thus lesser role in relation to the Father, they do not accept the idea that the Son is an inherently inferior being to the Father or that he was created by the Father. They have argued that the original edition of Ellen White's book The Desire of Ages did not support the Trinity. The CSDA view was held by the great majority of the early Seventh-day Adventist leadership, but was however abandoned in favor of the Trinity doctrine by the Seventh-day Adventist denomination in the mid-20th century.

=== Trademark dispute ===
The CSDA Church believes in a complete separation of Church and State (i.e., a rejection of the idea that governmental agencies possess the authority to intrude upon freedom of religion), and religious accountability for a church's actions. They differ from the Seventh-day Adventist denomination in their interpretation of this concept; the foremost example is that while the General Conference leadership sees trademark registration and enforcement as a necessary action to protect the Church's identity, the CSDA Church views this as a union of church and state to regulate religious observances, which they consider forbidden by the Scriptures. Their understanding of the accountability of members for the actions of their church leadership taken from passages such as Revelation 18:4, caused their separation from the mainstream Adventist body, particularly after the incarceration of Pastor John Marik over his use of the name "Seventh-day Adventist". The CSDA Church teaches that when a Church joins to the state to regulate religious observances, they “fall” in the sense that they are no longer God's chosen body, and the faithful people must come out of that organization. This view was also taught by early Adventists. The CSDA Church believes that the trademark on the name Seventh-day Adventist fulfills the prophecy of the mark of the beast, in that it both regulates religious observances and requires believers to submit to a law that they believe to violate their conscience.

=== The name Seventh-day Adventist ===
The CSDA Church believes that the name Seventh-day Adventist was given by God to describe the faith of Seventh-day Adventism, and that as a result, those who accept the beliefs of Adventism must use the name in identifying themselves and their organizations. They consider this to be a matter of conscience equivalent to denying or affirming the name “Christian” based on several quotes from Ellen G. White regarding the adoption and use of the name being Divinely commissioned.

=== Church membership ===
The CSDA Church holds strict views on church membership, claiming that once one has come into unity with Christ, unity with his church (which they hold themselves to be) will be the natural result, with one not being valid while rejecting the other.

=== Holy days and sacred names ===
The CSDA church observes New Moons monthly during the conjunction phase of the lunar cycle. Also referred to in their writings as the “New Moon Festival of Humility,” it is the day on which they partake of the communion meal, foot washing, and a meal called the agape feast in which they eat fresh fruits and nuts in anticipation of the marriage supper of the lamb after the return of Christ. They observe New Moons in a similar fashion to weekly Sabbaths in that they cease from secular work and trade. The CSDA Church holds their biannual camp meetings during the Spring and Fall feasts of Unleavened Bread and Tabernacles, respectively. This fashion of observing some of the Annual Feasts found in the Old Testament and use of the names יהוה (Yahweh) and יהושע (Yahshua) for the Father and Son of the Godhead in worship are generally practiced by members, although these are not dogmatically taught.
