= Steps to Christ =

Book written by Ellen G. White

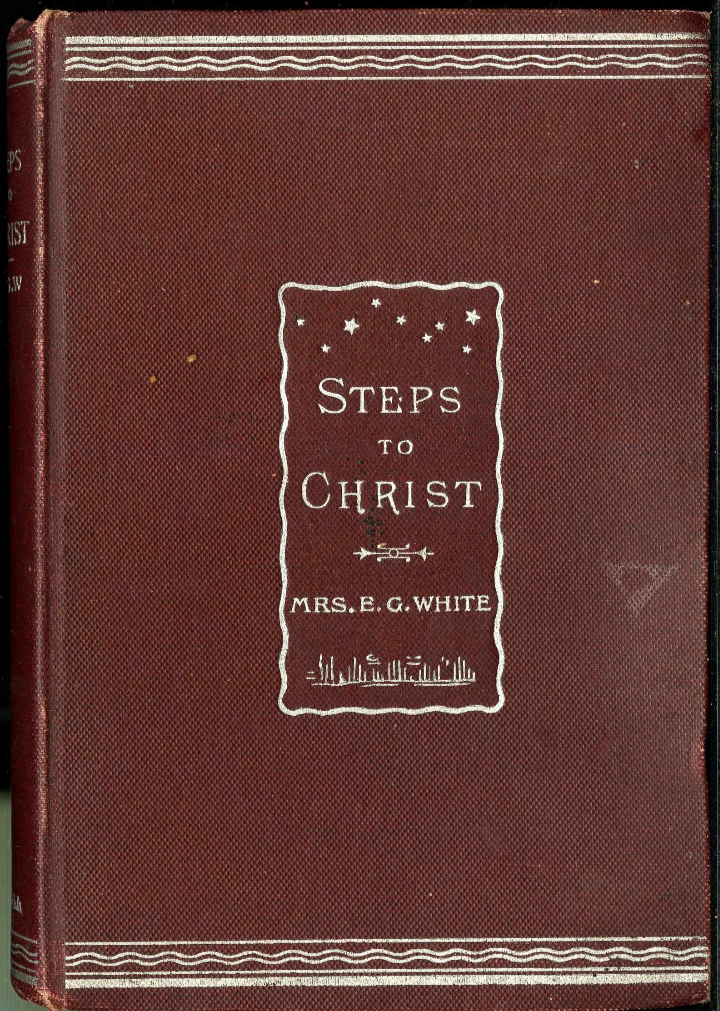
- Cover of original, 1892 printing of Steps to Christ
- Author: Ellen G. White
- Language: English
- Subject: Establishing a personal relationship with Jesus Christ
- Genre: Religious
- Publisher: Fleming H. Revell Company
- Publication date: 1892
- Publication place: United States
- Pages: 153 (hardback)
- ISBN: 0-8280-1235-0 (hardback)

Steps to Christ is a book written by Ellen G. White, pioneer of the Seventh-day Adventist Church. She is believed by some Seventh-day Adventists to have been inspired by God, and to have exercised the prophetic gift. It was first published in 1892 by Fleming H. Revell Company. The copyright was purchased by Seventh-day Adventist publisher Review and Herald Publishing Association in 1892, and was first printed there in 1896. A new first chapter, "God's Love for Man" was added per request of the Seventh-day Adventist publishing house in the United Kingdom (Stanborough Press) in 1893 in order to secure a copyright.

Steps to Christ by Ellen G. White has been translated into approximately 160 languages since its first publication in 1892. It is the most widely read work of its author, whose prolific literary productions are recognized as significant contributions to Christian literature of the nineteenth and early twentieth centuries.

Steps to Christ is considered to define what Seventh-day Adventists believe in subjects such as salvation, the nature of man, and what a Christian’s life should be.

Steps to Christ discusses how to come to know Jesus Christ at a personal level. It covers the topics of repentance, confession, faith, acceptance, growing into Christ, and prayer.

== Publication ==
Steps to Christ has been widely published by the Review and Herald Publishing Association and Pacific Press in multiple printings and by other publishers under public domain. Various titles have been distributed over the years with different cover illustrations. Other known titles include Happiness Digest, The Road to Redemption, The Path to Peace, and Finding Peace.

Versions containing inset boxes with additional inserted comments have been published for youth.

== Translations ==
=== Existing Translations ===
Steps to Christ has been printed in approximately 160 languages worldwide.

== See also ==
- The Desire of Ages
- Conflict of the Ages
- Teachings of Ellen White
- Inspiration of Ellen White
- List of Ellen White writings
