= New England's Dark Day =

1780 darkness in New England and Canada

- Date: May 19, 1780
- Location: New England
- Type: Weather phenomenon
- Cause: Combination of smoke from forest fires, a thick fog and cloud cover.
- Outcome: Candles were required from noon on

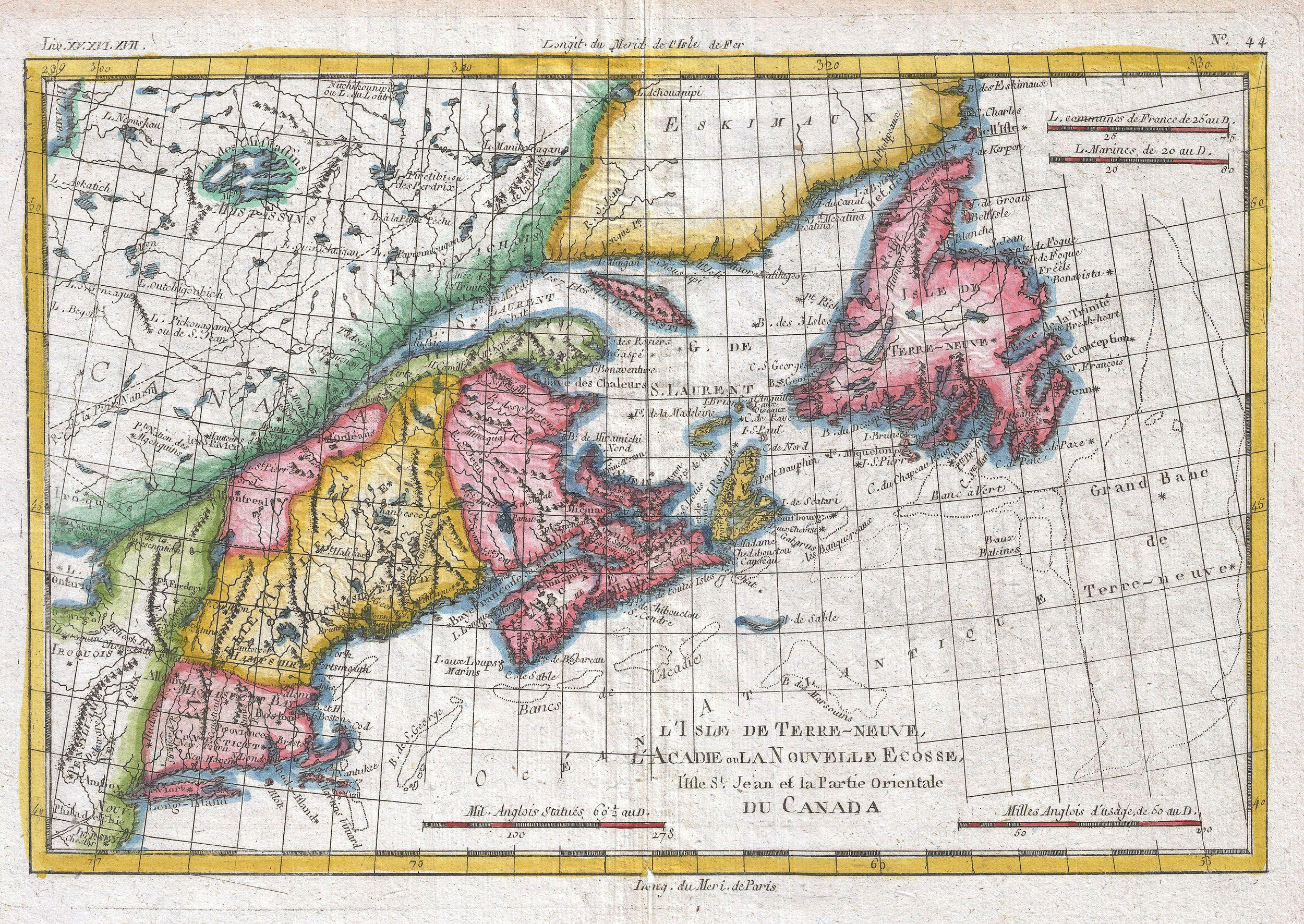
1780 map of the region

New England's Dark Day occurred on May 19, 1780, when an unusual darkening of the daytime sky was observed over the New England states and parts of eastern Canada. The darkness was so complete that candles were required from noon on. It did not disperse until the middle of the next night.

The primary cause of the event is now believed to have been a combination of smoke from forest fires, a thick fog, and cloud cover.

== Range of the darkness ==
According to Professor Samuel Williams of Harvard College, the darkness was seen at least as far north as Portland, Maine, and extended southward to New Jersey. The darkness was not witnessed in Pennsylvania.

Revolutionary War soldier Joseph Plumb Martin noted:

We were here [New Jersey] at the time the "dark day" happened, (19th of May;) it has been said that the darkness was not so great in New-Jersey as in New-England. How great it was there I do not know, but I know that it was very dark where I then was in New-Jersey; so much so that the fowls went to their roosts, the cocks crew and the whip-poor-wills sung their usual serenade; the people had to light candles in their houses to enable them to see to carry on their usual business; the night was as uncommonly dark as the day was.

== Progress ==
The earliest report of the darkness came from Rupert, Vermont, where the sun was already obscured at sunrise. Professor Samuel Williams observed from Cambridge, Massachusetts, "This extraordinary darkness came on between the hours of 10 and 11 a.m. and continued till the middle of the next night." Reverend Ebenezer Parkham of Westborough, Massachusetts, reported peak obscurity to occur "by 12," but did not record the time when it first arrived. At Harvard College, the obscuration was reported to arrive at 10:30 a.m., peaking at 12:45 p.m. and abating by 1:10 p.m., but a heavy overcast remained for the rest of the day. The obscuration was reported to have reached Barnstable, Massachusetts, by 2:00 p.m., with peak obscurity reported to have occurred at 5:30 p.m.

Roosters crowed, woodcocks whistled, and frogs peeped as if night had fallen at 2:00 p.m. in Ipswich, Massachusetts. A witness reported that a strong sooty smell prevailed in the atmosphere and that rain water had a light film over it that was made up of particles of burnt leaves and ash. Contemporaneous reports also indicated that ash and cinders fell on parts of New Hampshire to a depth of six inches (15 cm).

== Other atmospheric phenomena ==
For several days before the Dark Day, the sun as viewed from New England appeared to be red, and the sky appeared yellow. While the darkness was present, soot was observed to have collected in rivers and in rain water, suggesting the presence of smoke. Also, when the night really came in, observers saw the moon colored red. For portions of New England, the morning of May 19, 1780, was characterized by rain, indicating that cloud cover was present.

== Religious interpretations ==
Most people found the darkness to be baffling and inexplicable. Many applied religious interpretations to the event.

In Connecticut, a member of the Governor's council (renamed the Connecticut State Senate in 1818), Abraham Davenport, became most famous for his response to his colleagues' fears that it was the Day of Judgment:

I am against adjournment. The day of judgment is either approaching, or it is not. If it is not, there is no cause for an adjournment; if it is, I choose to be found doing my duty. I wish therefore that candles may be brought.

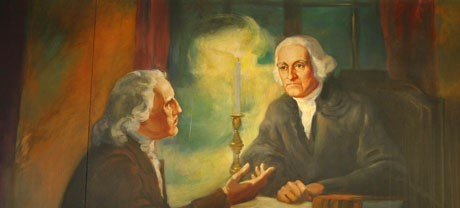
"Dark Day" by Delos Palmer depicting Abraham Davenport and Governor Jonathan Trumbull.

Davenport's courage was commemorated in the poem "Abraham Davenport" by John Greenleaf Whittier. Edwin Markham also commemorated the event in his poem "A Judgement Hour," found in The Gates of Paradise and Other Poems.

Seventh-day Adventist author and editor Arthur S. Maxwell mentions this event in his The Bible Story series (volume 10). The significance of the incident is still debated among Adventist scholars today. Progressive Adventists do not necessarily interpret this as a sign that Jesus would soon return, but traditional historic and conservative Adventists who hold Ellen G. White's writings in higher regard still consider this date as one of the fulfillments of biblical prophecy, specifically Matthew 24:29, in which Jesus declares to his disciples, "Immediately after the distress of those days [of anti-Christian persecution,] the sun will be darkened, and the moon will not give its light..." (NIV)

Similarly, the Public Universal Friend treated the event as fulfillment of some prophecies of the Book of Revelation. The Dark Day also provided motivation for Ann Lee, leader of the Shakers (then living in Niskayuna, New York), to present her religious testimony to the public.

== Cause ==
Centuries after the event, studies of forests revealed the most likely cause. The likely cause of the Dark Day was smoke from extensive forest fires, for which there is contemporary evidence. Researchers examining tree rings and fire scars in present-day Algonquin Provincial Park in Ontario, Canada, have identified a fire in 1780 and attribute the Dark Day to that.

== In popular culture ==
The 2025 film The Testament of Ann Lee depicts the Dark Day and its relation to Ann Lee and Shakerism, but inaccurately depicts the darkness as being caused by a solar eclipse.

== See also ==
- Chinchaga Fire (1950, Canada)
- Orange Skies Day (2020, Northern California)
- Bridge Fire (2024, Victorville CA)
- 2019–20 Australian bushfire season which turned the sky yellow over much of New Zealand
- 2023 Canadian wildfires
