= Uncle Arthur =

Uncle Arthur may refer to:

- Uncle Arthur, pen name of prolific Seventh-day Adventist Church author Arthur S. Maxwell
- Uncle Arthur, a recurring character played by Paul Lynde on the television comedy series Bewitched.
- Uncle Arthur, a minor character from the television show The Simpsons; Simpson family#Extended Bouvier family
- Uncle Arthur, a character played by Australian comedian Glenn Robbins
- Uncle Arthur, a song published in 1967 by musician David Bowie
- Uncle Arthur, the name used by Private Frank Pike for Sergeant Arthur Wilson in British sitcom Dad's Army
