= Review and Herald =

Review and Herald may refer to either of the following Seventh-day Adventist entities:

- Adventist Review, the official church newspaper, formerly known as the Review and Herald
- Review and Herald Publishing Association, one of two major Seventh-day Adventist publishing houses in North America
