= The Desire of Ages =

Book by Ellen G. White (1898)

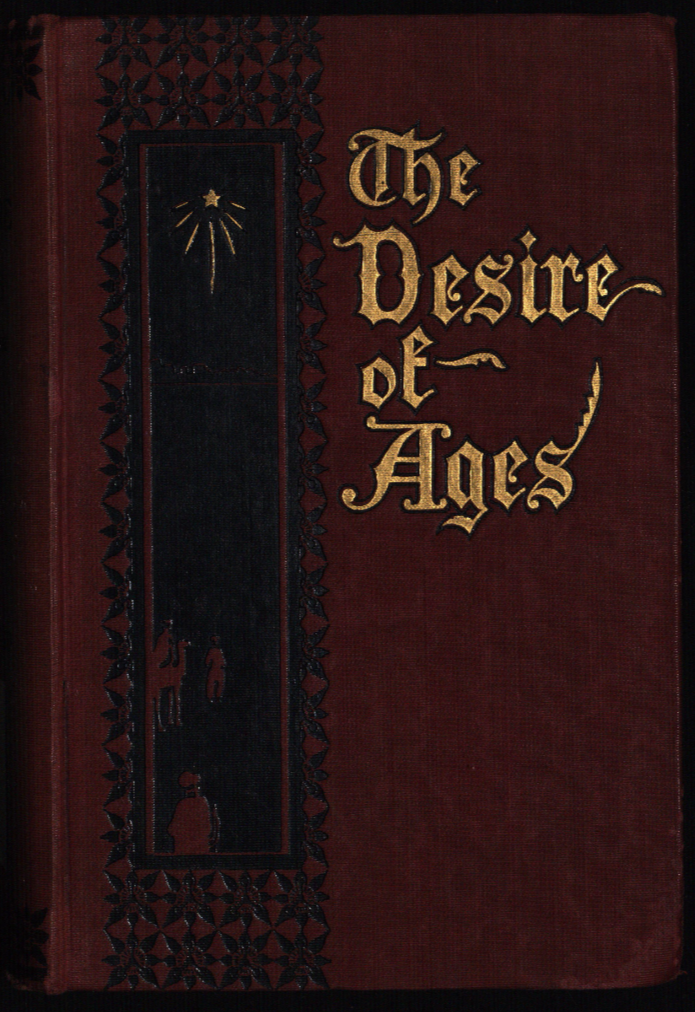
- Cover of original, 1898 printing of The Desire of Ages
- Author: Ellen G. White
- Language: English
- Subject: Establishing a personal relationship with Jesus Christ
- Genre: Religious
- Publisher: Pacific Press Publishing Company
- Publication date: 1898
- Publication place: United States
- Pages: 153 (hardback)

The Desire of Ages (DA) is a book about the life and teachings of Jesus Christ, written by the Seventh-day Adventist pioneer Ellen G. White. It was first published in 1898.

== Development and history ==
Written at Sunnyside Historical Home in New South Wales, Australia, DA was first published in 1898. It is in the third volume in a five-part series of her writings called the "Conflict of the Ages," that cover biblical material from Genesis to Revelation. They focus on "the battle raging in the universe between Christ and His angels and Satan and his fallen angels." In the third volume, DA focuses on the life of Jesus Christ and the love of God as revealed through Christ. While not set out chronologically, DA covers the entirety of Christ's ministry; from His pre-incarnation to His resurrection and ascension.

DA's compilation emerges from a gradual expansion of writing beginning in 1858. White, in vision, began receiving revelations concerning "the age-long conflict between Christ and Satan". She wrote them down in what we know today as, Spiritual Gifts, Volume 1 (1858). In 1867 and 1877, White rewrote and expanded upon Christ's life further, forming what we know today as, Spirit of Prophecy, Volumes 2 and 3. In the 1890's, this work expanded still further into three books: Thoughts from the Mount of Blessings (1896) – on the Sermon on the Mount, The Desire of Ages (1898), and Christ's Object Lessons (1900) – on Jesus' parables.

These works, in her own understanding, and in the understanding of many who acknowledge her prophetic gift, were compiled as a result of scenes she was directly shown by God in vision, and from things she was informed to write by the inspiration of the Holy Spirit. DA is considered by them to be an inspired book, meaning, a book written under the influence and inspiration of God through His Holy Spirit. While officially, Adventists do not consider White's writings to be on the same level as the Bible, many nonetheless consider them to be inspired by the same Holy Spirit which inspired the writers of the Bible.

While considered inspired by many Adventists, White did not possess linguistic and grammatical perfection, and she herself acknowledged this. She used editorial assistants to prepare her manuscripts for publication, proofing and critiquing them. These included her husband James, when compiling the Spiritual Gifts series, and Marian Davis, her primary editorial assistant in compiling DA. Some consider her use of assistants as a mark against her prophetic gift, even though some biblical writers like Paul also employed scribes.

More controversial was her practice of unacknowledged use of material from contemporary writers on the Gospels and the life of Christ in her writing DA and especially in her own pre-DA materials. This became such an issue in the 1970s and early 1980s, that the Adventist General Conference commissioned a major study by Fred Veltman to examine the extent and nature of White's literary dependence in writing on the life of Christ. His full 2,561-page report of the "'Life of Christ Research Project" is available online, along with an abridged and condensed editions. After eight years examining fifteen, randomly selected DA chapters for evidence of literary dependence, Veltman stated, "On an average we may say that 31.4 percent of the DA text is dependent to some extent on literary sources." However, he acknowledged, "But when you add to the literary dependence the similarity of ideas, particularly with reference to … the way in which the arrangement of the subunits of the chapters reflect the same thematic development as found in the sources, it becomes apparent that Ellen White is more dependent on her sources than the actual verbal parallels indicate."

Originally, DA was to be two books: Christ of Bethlehem: Our Brother and Christ of Calvary: Our Sacrifice. It was eventually published as one book, The Desire of Ages. Its title was based on the language of Haggai 2:7: "And I will shake all nations, and the desire of all nations shall come: and I will fill this house with glory, saith the Lord of hosts." (KJV).

== Posthumous publications ==
Since White's death in 1915, the Ellen G. White Estate published or authorized the publication of the following editions or selections from DA:

- We Have Seen His Star (1951), 70 pp. Selected from DA.
- Lord Is Risen (1952), 96 pp. Selected from DA.
- I Will Raise Him Up (1973), 23 pp. Selected from DA.
- Man Of Destiny (1981), 734 pp. Edition of DA.
- Message From Calvary (1981), 64 pp. Four chapters from DA.
- From Heaven With Love (1984), 556 pp. Condensed version of DA.
- Prophet Without Honor (1984), 408 pp. Selected from DA.
- The Desire Of Ages (1990), 2 vols: bk. 1 From Heaven With Love; bk. 2 The Destiny Of The World Decided.
- Messiah: A Contemporary Adaptation Of The Classic Work On Jesus' Life, The Desire Of Ages (2002), 447 pp. Modern paraphrase of DA.
- Story Of Jesus: From The Manger To The Throne (2003), 141 pp. Adaptation of DA for children.

== See also ==
- Steps to Christ
- Conflict of the Ages
- Teachings of Ellen White
- Ellen G. White bibliography

== Notes ==
=== Sources ===
- Arthur L. White, Ellen G. White: The Australian Years, 1891–1900. Hagerstown, MD: Review and Herald, 1983, ch. 32.
- Trenchard, Warren C. (2023). The Desire of Ages and Its Sources. Condensed Edition of "Life of Christ Research Project Report" by Fred Veltman. Westlake Village, CA: Oak & Acorn.
