= Conflict of the Ages =

Book series by Ellen G. White

The Conflict of the Ages is a book series written by American religious author Ellen G. White (1827–1915).

== Overview ==
The books follow the supposed Biblical history of the world, with special focus on the conflict between Christ and Satan. The series starts with the pre-creation rebellion of Satan in Heaven, then moves on to the creation of the earth, the fall of Adam and Eve into sin, the Old Testament, the birth and ministry of Jesus until His ascension, then the early Christian church, the Dark Ages, the Protestant reformation, the last days of earth's history, the second coming of Christ, the millennium, and the destruction of sin and finally the recreation of earth and God's kingdom with man for eternity. This progression explains in detail the Seventh-day Adventist (SDA) understanding of the conflict between Christ and Satan and their understanding of the Bible and much of world history. Mrs. White wrote the books based on her research of other authors and special information which she claimed to receive through visions from God. The books thus include unique insights and concepts not found in other works of the time.

== Controversy ==
Some Seventh-day Adventists have viewed Ellen G. White's writings, in particular the Conflict of the Ages series, as authoritative, verbally inspired by God, virtually on par with the Bible. However, Ellen White herself did not hold those views: her son, W.C. White, wrote in 1912 "Mother never thought that the readers would take it as authority on historical dates or use it to settle controversy regarding details of history, and she does not now feel that it should be used in that way."

Instead, Ellen White's purpose in writing the Conflict of the Ages series was to demonstrate God's love throughout the events of world history, and in so doing, defend the character of God.

== History ==
The idea for the Conflict of the Ages series originated from an 1858 book written by Ellen White, titled Spiritual Gifts Vol. 1: The Great Controversy between Christ and His Angels, and Satan and His Angels. The success of the book led to plans for the book to be expanded into four volumes, titled The Spirit of Prophecy. The first volume was published in 1870, the last in 1884.

By 1888, sales had been so great that the publisher informed Ellen White that they needed to completely reset the type for the book because the old type had worn out. The Great Controversy was rewritten for a wider audience, and was expanded to its current five volumes; the name "Conflict of the Ages" was applied to the series for the first time. Two of the volumes written during this era, Patriarchs and Prophets and The Desire of Ages, were written with the aftermath of the 1888 Minneapolis General Conference in mind; the volumes succeeded in rooting legalism out of the Seventh-day Adventist church.

Then in 1917, the series was completed for the last time. Citations were added to keep up with modern sourcing standards. This edition of the Conflict of the Ages was almost entirely overseen by the author Ellen White; the last two chapters of volume two, Prophets and Kings, were assembled from Ellen White's notes in order to complete the work.

== Books ==
=== Patriarchs and Prophets (1890) ===
Volume 1 covers from the rebellion of Satan in heaven to King David.

=== Prophets and Kings (1917) ===
Volume 2 covers events from King Solomon to Malachi.

=== The Desire of Ages (1898) ===
Volume 3 covers the life and ministry of Jesus.

=== Acts of the Apostles (1911) ===
Volume 4 covers from the Great Commission to John the Revelator on Patmos.

=== The Great Controversy (1888/1911) ===
Volume 5 covers the 70 A.D. destruction of Jerusalem, through Church History, to the end of sin and the recreation of the earth.

== See also ==
- Steps to Christ another popular book by E. G. White
- Teachings of Ellen White
- Ellen G. White bibliography
- Inspiration of Ellen White
- Seventh-day Adventist eschatology

== Sources ==
- White, Arthur L. (1985). Ellen G. White: The Early Years. Vol. 1. Ellen G. White Estate, Inc.
- White, Arthur L. (1984). Ellen G. White: The Lonely Years. Vol. 3. Ellen G. White Estate, Inc.
