= The Bible Story =

Children's story books by Arthur S. Maxwell

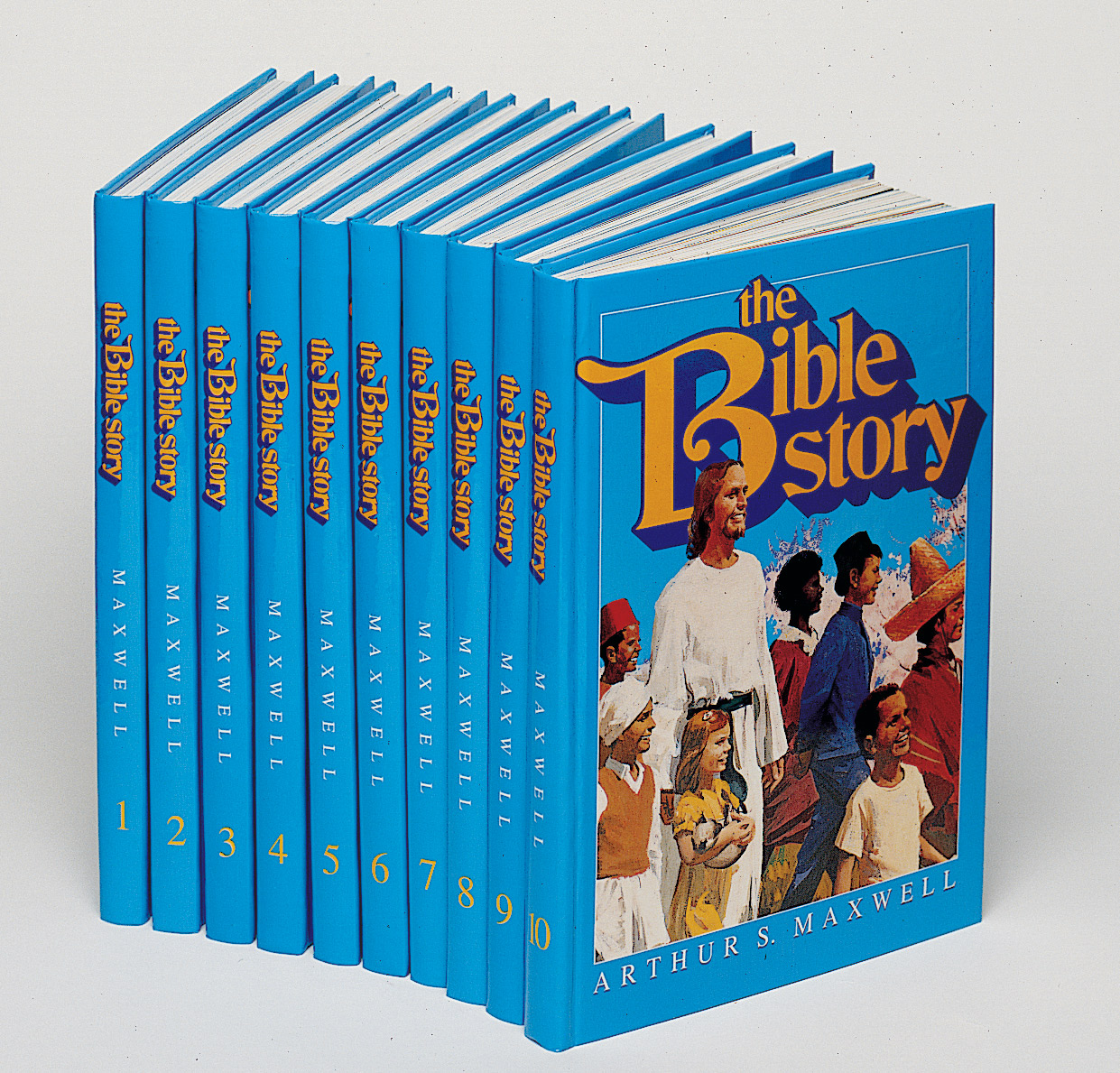
- The current edition of The Bible Story set
- Author: Arthur S. Maxwell
- Illustrator: Russell Harlan, William Heaslip, William Hutchinson, Manning de V. Lee, Lester Quade, Paul Remmy, Herbert Rudeen
- Published: 1953; 73 years ago
- Publisher: Review and Herald Publishing Association

The Bible Story is a ten-volume series of hardcover children's story books written by Arthur S. Maxwell based on the King James and Revised Standard versions of the Christian Bible. The books, published from 1953 to 1957, retell most of the narratives of the Bible in 411 stories. Maxwell started making arrangements for The Bible Story over a decade prior to 1959. He said that he spent seven years writing the stories, and considered it his most important work.

== Marketing ==
The books have been marketed in the United States for many years by placing the first volume, which covers the first part of the Book of Genesis, in doctor's offices with postage prepaid postcards included for readers to order the set or ask for more information. Originally written in English, the books have been translated into French, German, Finnish and Spanish (as Las Bellas Historias de la Biblia). The original English editions were based on the King James and Revised Standard versions of the Bible; more recent editions have been based on the New International Version of the Bible. Signs Publishing Company published volumes from the series, which The Age in 1960 called "a monumental achievement" and noted that "[t]he covers are most attractive". In a 1959 review, the Napa Valley Register said it was "beautifully illustrated with reproductions of an art collection valued at more than $500,000". 14 artists who were from nine countries contributed illustrations to the book. Illustrators included Harry Anderson, Harry Baerg, Vernon Nye, and Russell Harlan.

The Bible Story is jointly published by the Review and Herald Publishing Association and the Pacific Press Publishing Association, both closely associated with the Seventh-day Adventist Church. Maxwell presented the 10 Volume Bible Story set to both Ronald Reagan and John F. Kennedy.

== Reception ==
The film director Cecil B. DeMille praised the books, writing to Maxwell, "If you have done nothing else with your life but make the Bible simple for children, you have not lived in vain." Queen Elizabeth II and Ivy Baker Priest, the Treasurer of the United States, wrote "fan letters" to Maxwell about the books. The Queen added The Bible Story to the royal library so that Princess Anne and Prince Charles could read it. Priest read the books to her children. The Bible Story has sold over 1.5 million copies. The volume of sales was helped by a subscription model.

== See also ==
- Bible for children
