= Abraham Davenport =

American politician (1715–1789)

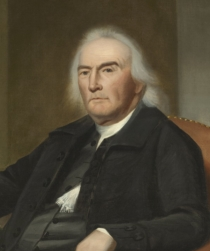
- 1788 portrait of Davenport
- Born: 1715; Stamford, Connecticut Colony, Kingdom of Great Britain
- Died: 20 November 1789 (aged 74); Danbury, Connecticut, US
- Burial place: Northfield, Connecticut, US
- Education: B.A., Yale College (1732)
- Spouses: Elizabeth Huntington (m. 1750; died 1773); Martha Fitch (m. 1776)
- Family: John Davenport (grandfather)
- Military career
- Service: Connecticut State Militia
- Rank: Colonel

Judge of the Stamford Probate Court
- In office 1768–1790

Member of the Connecticut Council
- In office 1766–1784

Member of the Connecticut House of Representatives from Stamford
- In office 1759–1766

Stamford Board of Selectmen
- In office 1746–1777

Abraham Davenport (1715–1789) was a Connecticut councillor and judge from Stamford. He was celebrated in a poem by John Greenleaf Whittier for his stoical reaction to New England's Dark Day (1780).

== Personal life ==
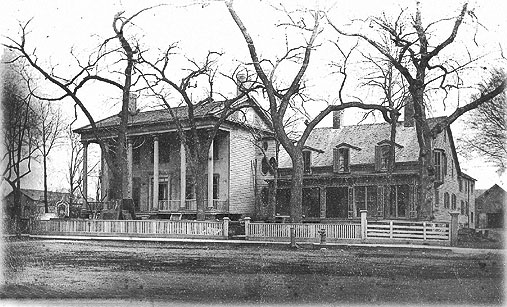
The Davenport homestead (c. 1882)

The grandson of New Haven Colony founder John Davenport, Abraham Davenport was born in the Connecticut Colony town of Stamford in 1715 to John and Elizabeth (née Maltby). Davenport's home in Stamford was on Main Street, near the corner of Summer Street. Davenport graduated from Yale College with his Bachelor of Arts in 1732. He married Elizabeth Huntington on 16 November 1750 in Windham, Connecticut, and she died on 17 December 1773; Davenport remarried to Martha Fitch on 8 August 1776 in Stamford. In the aftermath of the American Revolutionary War, Davenport took ill and wounded US soldiers into home to care for their recovery. Abraham Davenport died in Danbury, Connecticut on 20 November 1789 at age 74; he was buried in Northfield, Connecticut, bequeathing that land and £200 (equivalent to £31,055 in 2023) to the church.

== Public service ==
In 1737, Davenport was the Stamford town tithingman, and in 1738, he was the town surveyor. He also served on the Stamford board of selectmen (1746–1777) for 31 years, and in the Connecticut State Militia as a colonel.

=== Legislator ===
Davenport was a member of the Connecticut House of Representatives from 1759 to 1766, and the Connecticut Council from 1766 to 1784.

On New England's Dark Day (19 May 1780), that body was deliberating on an amendment regulating fisheries of Alosinae and alewife when the House adjourned due to darkness. Upon the suggestion that the Council should do the same, Davenport is reported to have said, "I am against adjournment. The day of judgment is either approaching, or it is not. If it is not, there is no cause for an adjournment; if it is, I choose to be found doing my duty. I wish therefore that candles may be brought." Candles were brought, deliberation continued, and the amendment was passed in the Council.

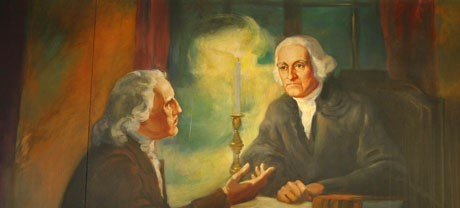
"Dark Day" by Delos Palmer

In his 1866 poem "Abraham Davenport" (Tent on the Beach), the Quaker poet John Greenleaf Whittier lauded the legislator: "And there he stands in memory to this day, Erect, self-poised, a rugged face, half seen Against the background of unnatural dark, A witness to the ages as they pass, That simple duty hath no place for fear." In November 1934, Delos Palmer—working under a Works Progress Administration commission—painted a Dark-Day mural of Davenport and Connecticut Governor Jonathan Trumbull in the Stamford city courtroom. At its dedication, Judge Charles Davenport Lockwood said the art "should be an inspiration and a lesson during these days of hard times [the Great Depression]." During his 1960 presidential campaign, John F. Kennedy made several references to Davenport and his stance on the Dark Day.

=== Judiciary ===
Despite his lack of formal legal training, Davenport was appointed judge of the Fairfield County Court, the Maritime Court of Fairfield County, and Stamford's probate court (from 1768 to 1790). In his waning years, Davenport served as the chief justice of the Connecticut Court of Common Pleas. The judge was in Danbury, Connecticut hearing a case when he suffered a myocardial infarction. He allegedly worked through the pain until the case was sent to the jury, then retired to his chamber and died.
