= Alonzo T. Jones =

American Seventh-day Adventist leader (1850–1923)

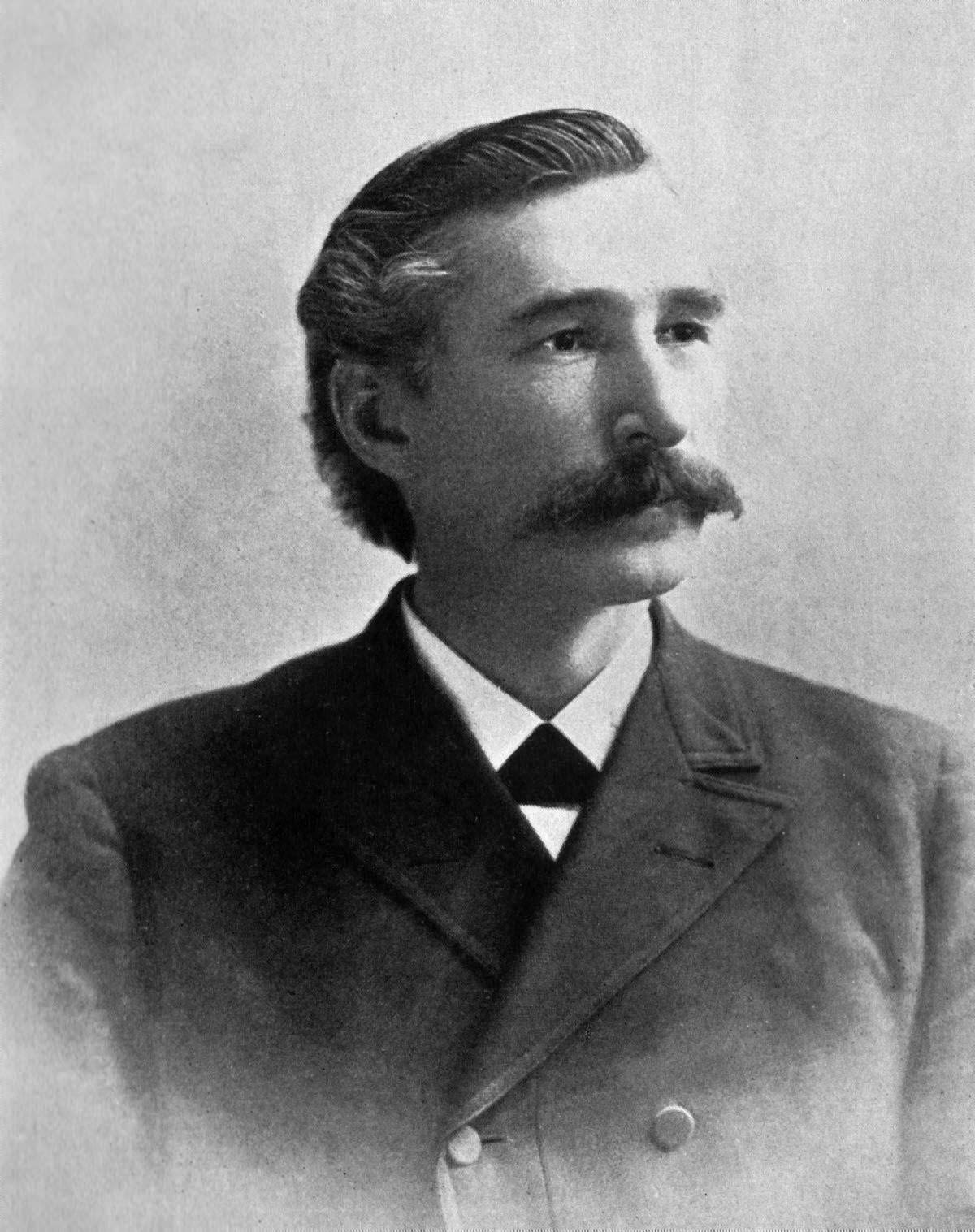

Personal details
- Born: 1850 Rock Hill, Ohio
- Died: May 12, 1923 (aged 72–73) Battle Creek
- Occupation: Editor of the Adventist Review

Alonzo Trévier Jones (1850 – May 12, 1923) was a Seventh-day Adventist known for his impact on the theology of the church, along with friend and associate Ellet J. Waggoner. He was a key participant in the 1888 Minneapolis General Conference Session regarded as a landmark event in the history of the Seventh-day Adventist Church.

== Biography ==
Jones was born in Rock Hill in Lawrence County, Ohio, in 1850. When he was 20 years old, he joined the United States Army, serving until 1873, and participating in the Modoc War in northeastern California and southeastern Oregon. While serving in the armed forces, Jones spent his spare time poring over historical works, primarily of ancient history. Applying the knowledge thus gained to the prophecies of the Bible, Jones later wrote four large volumes dealing with the subject of Bible prophecy (The Two Republics, 1891; and The Great Empires of Prophecy, 1898; Ecclesiastical Empire, 1901; The Empires of the Bible, 1897).

Upon discharge from the army, Jones became a baptized member of the Seventh-day Adventist Church in 1874 and began preaching in California; he was eventually ordained as a minister in 1878. His proclivity for writing led him to connect with the editor of Signs of the Times magazine, an evangelistic periodical published by the church. In May 1885, he became assistant editor of that publication. A few months later, he and Dr. E. J. Waggoner became co-editors; Jones held this position until 1889.

In addition to this position, together with E. J. Waggoner, in 1887 Jones also became editor of the American Sentinel, the official organ of the religious liberty department of the Seventh-day Adventist Church (later known as the Sentinel of Liberty, and finally simply Liberty magazine). Jones served as editor of this publication until 1896. In 1897, Jones was voted into the General Conference Committee, serving until 1899. Also in 1897, he was appointed editor of the church's flagship publication, Review and Herald magazine (now the Adventist Review), where he served until 1901 with Uriah Smith as his associate editor.

Jones's most significant contributions were his sermons on Christ and His righteousness presented at the 1888 Minneapolis General Conference session, as well as General Conference sessions in 1893 and 1895. He is also known for later writings on that subject, and his work in preserving the liberty of conscience guaranteed under the First Amendment.

In 1889, A. T. Jones spoke before a United States Congressional subcommittee; the topic of discussion was the “Breckinridge Bill” which proposed the compulsion of Sunday observance in the Washington, D.C., environs. Jones's testimony helped to defeat this bill, and Jones became known for his abilities in defense of and knowledge regarding freedom of religion. In 1892, he was again called to speak before the U.S. Congress regarding the Sunday closure of the Chicago World's Fair, known as "World's Columbian Exposition".

From 1901 to 1903, Jones served as president of the California Conference of the church. Leaving this position, he accepted an invitation to work with Dr. John Harvey Kellogg at the Battle Creek Sanitarium at Battle Creek, Michigan, which was under Kellogg's directorship. Because Kellogg was at that time in conflict with the leadership of the church, Jones was counseled by Ellen White and church leaders not to pursue this course. Coupled with tensions arising from theological opposition that had dogged him since the 1888 General Conference session, Jones's association with Kellogg soon soured his allegiance to the Church and ceased his denominational employment and fellowship.

Though separated from fellowship, A. T. Jones remained loyal to the doctrines of the Seventh-day Adventist Church until his death of a stroke on May 12, 1923, in Battle Creek at age 73.

== 1888 General Conference Meeting ==
The historic debate over righteousness by faith at the SDA General Conference session in Minneapolis, Minnesota, autumn, 1888, resulted from a series of studies presented by A. T. Jones and E. J. Waggoner. Jones along with Waggoner presented a message of Righteousness by Faith. Their message presented Christ in all His glory as the Saviour of all mankind, it brought balance between Justification and Sanctification. When properly understood through a heart appreciation of what it cost the Godhead to redeem fallen man from sin, this truth results in a heart surrender to the will of God, producing faithful obedience to all the commandments of God.

Focusing upon the merits of Christ as the sole basis for Justification, they warned fellow workers against what they considered a legalistic trend the church was tending to drift into. Seeing in this emphasis a threat to the law and other distinctive doctrines, key denominational leaders strenuously opposed the men and their message.

From the onset of the 1888 Minneapolis Conference, Ellen White perceived that a battle over truth was erupting within the denomination.

Ellen White was convinced that God had "raised up" for this moment these two young ministers, E. J. Waggoner and A. T. Jones, to give a message to the delegates at the conference."I believe without a doubt that God has given precious truth at the right time to Brother Jones and Brother Waggoner. Do I place them as infallible? Do I say that they will not make a statement or have an idea that cannot be questioned or that cannot be error? Do I say so? No, I do not say any such thing. Nor do I say that of any man in the world. But I do say God has sent light, and do be careful how you treat it."

Adventists taught that salvation comes through faith in Jesus Christ, but the emphasis had tended to be more on works than on sanctification. Placing righteousness by faith squarely on the foundation of Christ and His righteousness, and Christ's work as our High Priest during the antitypical Day of Atonement, brought a fresh perspective to the doctrine as it had previously been preached from Adventist pulpits.

Ellen White saw the importance of the 1888 message Jones and Waggoner brought and why it was needed for the members can be seen in her comments on the message of righteousness by faith.

Many had lost sight of Jesus. They needed to have their eyes directed to His divine person, His merits, and His changeless love for the human family. All power is given into His hands, that He may dispense rich gifts unto men, imparting the priceless gift of His own righteousness to the helpless human agent.

— Testimonies to Ministers, 92

The uplifted Saviour is to appear in His efficacious work as the Lamb slain, sitting upon the throne, to dispense the priceless covenant blessings, the benefits He died to purchase for every soul who should believe on Him. John could not express that love in words; it was too deep, too broad; he calls upon the human family to behold it. Christ is pleading for the church in the heavenly courts above, pleading for those for whom He paid the redemption price of His own lifeblood. Centuries, ages, can never diminish the efficacy of this atoning sacrifice. The message of the gospel of His grace was to be given to the church in clear and distinct lines, that the world should no longer say that Seventh-day Adventists talk the law, the law, but do not teach or believe Christ." Ibid.

Ellen White promoted the message of righteousness by faith presented by E. J. Waggoner and A. T. Jones, leading to a more Christ-centered theology for the church. When church leaders resisted her counsel on this and various other matters, she was sent to Australia as a missionary.

However, the intense discussions on righteous by faith continued to the close of the century, during which time White gave strong support to the Minneapolis message by voice and pen.

== Sinless Perfection ==
In addition to the message of righteousness by faith, A. T. Jones held that Christ was made "in all things" like unto us and was also our example and there must be a moral and spiritual perfection of the believers before the end time. In The Consecrated Way to Christian Perfection, he wrote:

Sanctification is the true keeping of all the commandments of God. In other words, this is to say that the will of God concerning man is that His will shall be perfectly fulfilled in man. His will is expressed in His law of ten commandments, which is "the whole duty of man." This law is perfect, and perfection of character is the perfect expression of this law in the life of the worshiper of God. By this law is the knowledge of sin. And all have sinned and have come short of the glory of God—have come short of this perfection of character... In His coming in the flesh—having been made in all things like unto us and having been tempted in all points like as we are—He has identified Himself with every human soul just where that soul is. And from the place where every human soul is, He has consecrated for that soul a new and living way through all the vicissitudes and experiences of a whole lifetime, and even through death and the tomb, into the holiest of all at the right hand of God for evermore... Perfection, perfection of character, is the Christian goal—perfection attained in human flesh in this world. Christ attained it in human flesh in this world and thus made and consecrated a way by which, in Him, every believer can attain it. He, having attained it, has become our great High Priest, by His priestly ministry in the true sanctuary to enable us to attain.

— The Consecrated Way to Christian Perfection, A. T. Jones. Chapter 12, 43, 45

== Selected publications ==
- Matthew 24 (1890–1900)
- Revelation 13 & 14 (1886–1888)
- The Third Angel's Message (1893, 1895, 1897)
- Studies In The Book Of Daniel (1898)
- The Place Of The Bible In Christian Education
- The Two Republics
- The Consecrated Way to Christian Perfection (1888–1889)
- National Sunday Law (1888);
- Religious Liberty

== See also ==
- E. J. Waggoner
- 1888 Minneapolis General Conference
- History of the Seventh-day Adventist Church
- Carta de Jones de Resposta a Dramática Expulsão da Igreja

Preceded by Uriah Smith	Editor of the Adventist Review; 1897 – 1901	Succeeded by Uriah Smith
