= Ellet J. Waggoner =

Ellet Joseph Waggoner
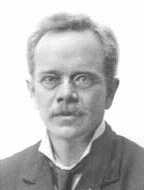
- Born: January 12, 1855; Baraboo, Wisconsin, U.S.
- Died: May 28, 1916 (aged 61); Battle Creek, Michigan, U.S.
- Other name: E. J. Waggoner
- Education: Andrews University; Bellevue Medical College
- Occupations: Author; Physician; Newspaper Editor
- Spouses: Jessie Moser (m. 1870s; divorced); Edith Adams (m 17 Sep 1906 )
- Children: Bessie Isadore Waggoner 26 Nov 1882 (Harrower); Pearl - Winnie Pearl Waggoner 27 Feb 1885 (Howard); Ernest Eugene Waggoner 12 Aug 1888
- Parents: Joseph Harvey Waggoner; Maryetta Hall Waggoner
- Relatives: 9 siblings (5 older)

Ellet Joseph "E.J." Waggoner (January 12, 1855 – May 28, 1916) was a Seventh-day Adventist particularly known for his impact on the theology of the church, along with friend and associate Alonzo T. Jones at the 1888 Minneapolis General Conference Session. At the meeting of the General Conference of Seventh-day Adventists Ellet J. Waggoner along with Alonzo T. Jones presented a message on justification supported by Ellen G. White, but resisted by church leaders such as G. I. Butler and others. He supported theological issues such as the meaning of "righteousness by faith", the nature of the Godhead, the relationship between law and grace, and Justification and its relationship to Sanctification.

== Biography ==
Waggoner was born in Baraboo, Wisconsin on January 12, 1855, to Joseph Harvey and Maryetta Hall Waggoner. He was the sixth of ten children.

His father had joined an Advent group in 1852, which would later become the Seventh-day Adventist Church. Soon thereafter he became a preacher and writer, and remained active until his death in 1889. He was on the committee that adopted the official name – Seventh-day Adventist – that is still in use today.

Ellet Waggoner attended Battle Creek College in 1874 (now Andrews University). Conflicting reports about Waggoner's medical school education was reported by Woodrow W. Whidden in his book "E.J. Waggoner: From the Physician of Good News to the Agent of Division". Waggoner's daughter, Pearl Waggoner Howard, claimed (from 1956 to late 1961) that her father graduated from Ann Arbor University and received his Doctor of Medicine from there. Other biographies claimed his graduation from Bellevue Medical College in New York City. However, her investigations led to the discovery that he graduated from Long Island College Hospital of Brooklyn in 1878 and may have taken some courses at Bellevue Medical College.

For some time he served on the staff of the Battle Creek Sanitarium. During this time, he married Jessie Moser, whom he had met at Battle Creek College. Jessie and Waggoner had two daughters, Bessie and Pearl. They moved to California about 1880, where he served as manager of the St. Helena Hospital in Saint Helena, California.

In 1883, Waggoner stopped practicing medicine and became the assistant editor for the Signs of the Times – an official paper presenting the stands and views of the Seventh-day Adventist Church. His father, J. H. Waggoner was then the editor.

He met Alonzo T. Jones in 1884. In 1886 Ellet Waggoner and his friend Jones became joint editors of the Signs of the Times. Waggoner held this post until 1891. The magazine published a number of his articles in the five years preceding the notable 1888 Minneapolis General Conference. In 1888 Waggoner presented his ideas regarding righteousness by faith at the General Conference session held in Minneapolis, Minnesota. The events surrounding and topics presented at that session continue to be debated and studied.

Waggoner also co-edited the Seventh-Day Adventist's first periodical dedicated to religious liberty, The American Sentinel, started by Waggoner's father, where he was editor from 1887 to 1890. "The Sentinel’s predominant concern was to resist the growing momentum for a constitutional amendment that would declare the United States to be a “Christian nation.”" Waggoner considered such legislation “inconsistent . . . with civil liberty” and "anti-Christian," as it would reduce the word of God to a mere political tool and went against "what the nation’s founders struggled to establish."

In 1892 Waggoner went to England where he became the editor of The Present Truth magazine. He remained there for ten years, working with W. W. Prescott in the training school in England, and continuing in his writing and studies on Christ and His righteousness.

Upon his return to the United States, he joined the faculty of Emmanuel Missionary College (now Andrews University). Because of a divorce and his subsequent remarriage, he separated from denominational employment. He spent the last years of his life employed by the Battle Creek Sanitarium.

Waggoner experienced a stroke in his sleep and died at home in Battle Creek on Friday, May 28, 1916.

== Publications ==
Some of his better known writings include

- The Glad Tidings (1900 Original)
- The Everlasting Covenant (1896)
- The Gospel in Creation (1895)
- The Gospel in Galatians (1887)
- Waggoner on Romans (1896)
- Sermons on Romans (1891)
- Christ and His Righteousness (1889)
- The Fathers of the Catholic Church
- The American Sentinel (1886, listed as editor from 1887-06 until 1890-05-08)

Also:

- Prophetic Lights (DjVu format)
- The Return of Christ (88 P.);
- A Witness to All Nations (53 P.);
- The Law and the Gospel (357 P.);
- The Great Falling Away (734 P.);
- Spiritualism (1888; 109 P.);
- Healing and Temperance (681 P.).

== See also ==
- Alonzo T. Jones
- 1888 Minneapolis General Conference
- History of the Seventh-day Adventist Church
- Seventh-day Adventist Church
- Seventh-day Adventist theology
- Seventh-day Adventist eschatology
- Teachings of Ellen White
- Inspiration of Ellen White
- Prophecy in the Seventh-day Adventist Church
- Investigative judgment
- The Pillars of Adventism
- Second Advent
- Baptism by Immersion
- Conditional Immortality
- Historicism
- Three Angels' Messages
- End times
- Sabbath in Seventh-day Adventism
- Ellen G. White
- Adventist Review
- Adventist
- Seventh-day Adventist Church Pioneers
- Seventh-day Adventist worship

== References and external links ==
- Richard Lewis, ed. The Living Witness (Mountain View, Calf.: Pacific Press, 1959).
- David P. McMahon. Ellet Joseph Waggoner: The Myth and the Man (SDA.net version) (Fallbrook, Calif.: Verdict Publications, 1979).
- R. W. Schwartz. Light Bearers to the Remnant (Boise, Idaho: Pacific Press, 1979).
- A. W. Spalding. Captains of the Host. (Washington, DC: Review and Herald, 1949).
- Clinton Wahlen, "What Did E. J. Waggoner Say at Minneapolis?" Adventist Heritage 13:1 (Winter 1988): 22–37
- "The Christology of Ellet Joseph Waggoner", chapter 3 in Webster, Claude (1984). Crosscurrents in Adventist Christology. New York: Peter Lang Publishing. ISBN 0-8204-0157-9. Reprinted with permission by Andrews University Press. Berrien Springs, MI (February 1992)
- Woodrow W. Whidden II. E. J. Waggoner: From the Physician of Good News to Agent of Division (Hagerstown, MD: Review and Herald, 2008)
