= 1888 Minneapolis General Conference =

General Conference of Seventh-day Adventists

The 1888 Minneapolis General Conference Session was a meeting of the General Conference of Seventh-day Adventists held in Minneapolis, Minnesota, in October 1888. It is regarded as a landmark event in the history of the Seventh-day Adventist Church. Key participants were Alonzo T. Jones and Ellet J. Waggoner, who presented a message on Justification by Faith (Gal. 2:16; Rom. 3:28) supported by Ellen G. White, but resisted by leaders such as G. I. Butler, Uriah Smith and others. The session discussed crucial theological issues such as the meaning of "righteousness by faith", the nature of the Godhead, the relationship between law and grace, and Justification and its relationship to Sanctification.

== Introduction ==
The Seventh-day Adventist Church General Conference Session of 1888 was held in Minneapolis, Minnesota. It was one of the most significant meetings the denomination had ever had up to that time since it was formally organized on May 23, 1863. Church historians, theologians, and laypersons consider the session to be important. They differ in their own perspective and interpretation of the specific events, the message presented there, and the ensuing reactions. The "joint Minneapolis Institute and General Conference, of 1888, involved vastly more than appeared on the surface. It was the culmination of a whole series of developments that led up to it."

== Foundational experience ==
The founding pioneers of the Seventh-day Adventist Church believed in Jesus Christ as their Lord and Saviour and the Bible as their guide in life. Those who had come through the Millerite Movement had first-hand knowledge of disappointment and discouragement. As they studied the Scriptures concerning end time prophecy, the sanctuary types and their fulfillment, and the perpetuity of the law of God, they saw the necessity for organization as a means for proclaiming these truths to the world. The denomination was formally organized on May 23, 1863, in Battle Creek, Michigan.

The men and women who were a part of the development of this denomination came from various religious backgrounds, bringing with them into the new movement some beliefs peculiar to their former associations. Two significant hold-over theological views were semi-Pelagianism and semi-Arianism. The focus of the early Seventh-day Adventist Church tended more toward basic denominational organization and development, emphasis on obedience to the Ten Commandments, and efforts at evangelism and church growth during the anguish of the American Civil War and its aftermath. After its formation the doctrines of salvation and righteousness by faith were understood and accepted but stayed in the background, mostly because these truths were familiar to most churches, so bringing out of these and other specific theological points awaited later focus and discussion. Though their Biblical arguments brought many to the church, they had minimized the centrality of the indwelling Christ as the only power to obey the commandments and to keep the Sabbath, and self-satisfaction and complacency began to affect the church.

There was nothing wrong with such material progress... It was right and proper that institutes be established, that the work spread into new regions and churches everywhere be raised up. But ministers and laity alike mistook this growth for the true end and purpose of the Advent movement — a spiritual preparation for the return of Christ. Confusion resulted, and self-esteem and complacency began to surface in the weekly reports of 'the advance of the cause' as published in the Review.

== Sources of the developing conflict ==
By the second generation of the movement, the denomination had spread across the United States and had mission fields around the world. As the church grew, so did opposition (and in some places, persecution), particularly regarding the seventh-day Sabbath. Emphasis on the Ten Commandments as a part of obedience to God was a firmly established and central tenet of the denomination by the 1870s. Sunday-keeping Christians claimed that keeping the seventh-day Sabbath was a sign of legalism or judaizing. Convinced of the Biblical correctness of the seventh-day Sabbath, Seventh-day Adventists turned to their Bibles to show the beliefs and doctrines from scripture and teach other Christians, prompting the moniker "People of the Book" to be applied to them, and not a few became decidedly legalistic. So at the 1888 General Conference Session in Minneapolis, the presentation of the message of Christ as the only source of righteousness by two young preachers was going to create conflict with some members including church leaders.

=== Defending Sabbath observance ===
Ministers and laypersons alike used scriptures in debating the beliefs of Adventist, including this particular issue, from Scripture. However, there was still much opposition to the Sabbath belief, and there were Christians that said that Seventh-day Adventists were indeed legalists who held strictly to the "letter of the law." All the work involved in developing and extending the denomination seemed to force attention upon what the individual could accomplish, opening the door to self-reliance in spiritual matters. The Christ-centered gospel was displaced by man's efforts.

Powerful arguments were developed to establish [the law's] 'binding obligations.' Debaters and polemicists emerged, stressing the Sabbath, the Law, etc. — like lawyers arguing a case. Spirituality waned, and not a few became decided legalists... Cold intellectualism and dry theory increased. Christ often became secondary, and Righteousness by Faith largely lost sight of, through outward profession without inner experience. The majesty of the message and the law was magnified. But something was lacking. Discussions were logical and convincing, but not Christ-centered.

=== Non-trinitarianism and the atonement ===
A second issue that paved the way for the discussions at Minneapolis was the non-trinitarian view on the divinity of Christ. This was not an openly discussed theological perspective but was a view that many of the early church leaders had brought in from the churches they came from. Some prominent writers and speakers, such as Uriah Smith, long-time editor of the Church's chief publication, held on to them firmly eschewing the idea of a creed, the denomination made no attempt at developing a systematic declaration of fundamental beliefs, or "Fundamental Principles," until 1872. A declaration of the nature of the Godhead and Christ as the fully divine "Son of God" appeared at that time. After the 1888 Minneapolis General Conference, additions on these subjects were made to the Bible Readings for the Home Circle, published by the Pacific Press. Uriah Smith (1832–1903), long-time editor of the Review and Herald (now Adventist Review), the official organ of the Seventh-day Adventist Church, had expounded this position in his discourse on the Book of Revelation first published in 1865. Commenting on Revelation 1:4, Smith set forth a straight forward non-trinitarian position by claiming that the language of the verse was "applicable only to God the Father," and was "never applied to Christ."

Another Adventist pioneer who held to what has been called by some in the denomination, the "Arian" or non-trinitarian view was Joseph H. Waggoner (1820–1889), Ellet J. Waggoner's father. J. H. Waggoner was an early convert to the Advent movement, serving on the committee called in 1860 to form the legal organization of the denomination. In 1881, Joseph H. Waggoner succeeded James White as editor of the Pacific coast evangelistic magazine, Signs of the Times. Through his several books on the atonement, the elder Waggoner wrote that Christ was only God in "a subordinate sense." His main point of dispute was the Trinitarian concept of three divine persons forming one Divine being composed of God the Father, God the Son, and God the Holy Spirit. In his expanded volume on the atonement, J. H. Waggoner devoted two chapters in his attempt to prove that the Trinitarian view was false because it inferred that Christ, being God, could not have died on the cross of Calvary, and thus full atonement for sin could not have been made.

Other church leaders composing the majority of the founding Pioneers who espoused the belief in only one Divine being called "God," with Christ being the Divine "Son of God", were: James S. White (Ellen White's husband), Joseph Bates, J. N. Andrews, J. N. Loughborough, S. N. Haskell, R. F. Cottrell, J. B. Frisbie, J. G. Matteson, M. E. Cornell and others. A representative statement from these leaders is given here: "The Scriptures abundantly teach the pre-existence of Christ and his divinity, but they are entirely silent in regard to a Trinity." (J. H. Waggoner, The Atonement, p. 173)

Church Founder and Prophet Ellen White wrote to clarify: "God is the Father of Christ; Christ is the Son of God. To Christ has been given an exalted position. He has been made equal with the Father. All the counsels of God are opened to His Son." {8 Testimonies p. 268.3 1904} This language and other such widely accepted statements strongly upheld the non-trinitarian foundation of the early Seventh-day Adventist Church. Still, more current SDA Church periodicals point out that the founding leaders of the Church are now regarded as in error on the topic of the Godhead since the SDA Church officially embraced the Trinity doctrine at the Dallas General Conference meeting held in 1980. One example of this is here: "Most of the founders of Seventh-day Adventism would not be able to join the church today if they had to subscribe to the denomination's Fundamental Beliefs... More specifically, most would not be able to agree to belief number 2, which deals with the doctrine of the Trinity." (Ministry Magazine, Oct. 1993, p. 10)

== Open confrontation ==
E. J. Waggoner was selected as a delegate from California to attend the 1886 General Conference session held that year at Battle Creek, Michigan. When he arrived he found that church leaders such as Butler strongly opposed his emphasis on Christ as the sole source of righteousness, especially in light of Waggoner's teaching on the law in Galatians. Butler prepared a small booklet titled "The Law in the Book of Galatians" that was handed out to all the delegates at that conference, countering Waggoner's position. (Read a PDF of this document online) In this document, Butler presented his position on the law in Galatians, and stated that Waggoner's view would lead the antinomian Christians who opposed Sabbath-keeping to find a reason to claim that the moral law (especially the fourth commandment) was "nailed to the cross" and therefore was "no longer binding" on New Testament Christians.

The Westerners had reverted to the early Seventh-day Adventist position that the law Paul here referred to as the 'schoolmaster to bring us to Christ' (verse 24) was the whole body of the moral law including the Ten Commandments. This position the Adventists had almost entirely abandoned during the 1860s and 1870s; the 'schoolmaster' was reinterpreted to mean the ceremonial and sacrificial laws of Moses which pointed forward to the Messiah. This reinterpretation had developed largely as a reaction to Protestant clergymen who interpreted Paul's statement in Galatians 3:25 ('we are no longer under the schoolmaster') to mean that the Ten Commandment law had been abrogated; thus, the seventh-day Sabbath was no longer viable.

Ellen White initially saw the conflict as a small diversionary topic but quickly realized the danger and that it was counter-productive to the real issue of the fulfillment of Adventist message of Christ's return and moved to resolve the uncomfortable situation.

=== Summary of the forerunning conflict ===
Thus we find these two main points of contention facing the delegates at Minneapolis: justification is by faith not by works, and the view of the Godhead and its effect on the doctrine of the atonement. Prior to the 1888 Minneapolis conference a third topic of contention developed between Uriah Smith and A. T. Jones. Jones was an avid student of history, especially as it applied to the prophecies of the Bible. He had discovered that the Alemanni and not the Huns were one of the ten horns (tribes or nations) described prophetically in Daniel 7. Smith took grave exception to this new view, relying on the traditional position of the Millerites to support his position.

Jones was accordingly regarded by some as the fosterer of a new historical 'heresy,' while Waggoner was thought to be projecting a doctrinal deviation — which departures would have to be settled at the Minneapolis Meeting. Preconceived opinions and strong prejudice were firmly entrenched due to the previous two years' contentions between Waggoner and Butler, and Jones and Smith.

== Season of debate ==
=== Ministerial Bible Institute ===
Prior to the actual General Conference session, a Bible Institute was convened beginning on Wednesday Oct. 10, 1888. The General Conference session began on Oct. 18 and ran through more than two full weeks, ending on Sunday Nov. 4, 1888. It was during the Bible Institute that A. T. Jones delivered his evidence supporting the idea that the Alemanni were one of the ten horns of prophecy that succeeded the crumbling Roman Empire.

"Jones had done his homework well. No one was able effectively to dispute the historical evidence he cited in favor of the Alemanni's right to supplant the Huns as one of the kingdoms succeeding Rome. Uriah Smith, Adventism's most noted prophetic expositor, was placed on the defensive. On one occasion he modestly disclaimed originality for the list of kingdoms he had given in Thoughts on Daniel. Smith admitted having simply followed Millerite and earlier interpreters on this point." Such strong lines were drawn regarding this subject that during the ensuing weeks of the conference when men would pass each other in the halls, they inquired of each other whether they were "Huns" or "Alemanni."

"Thus did a dispute over a minor point set the pot of controversy boiling before the really significant theological presentation began." "Many had come to the Conference expecting a clash, and so were not disappointed. Such entered it in a fighting spirit, and a definite split developed. The gulf was wide and deep."

From the onset of the 1888 Minneapolis Conference, Ellen White perceived that a battle over truth was erupting within the denomination. At first, Ellen White rejoiced that the spirit of God was at the meeting and commented that the leaders "heard as it were God speaking to them through his Son. They saw, they felt the divine influence of the Spirit of God and all witnessed to the gracious words that proceeded from His mouth [Ellen White, Manuscript 24, 1888.]." Ellen White soon discovered, however, that other forces were deliberately at work planning to disrupt and confuse the mission and message of the Seventh-day Adventist Church. Ellen White was convinced that God had "raised up" for this moment these two young ministers, E. J. Waggoner and A. T. Jones, to give a message to the delegates at the conference."I believe without a doubt that God has given precious truth at the right time to Brother Jones and Brother Waggoner. Do I place them as infallible? Do I say that they will not make a statement or have an idea that cannot be questioned or that cannot be error? Do I say so? No, I do not say any such thing. Nor do I say that of any man in the world. But I do say God has sent light, and do be careful how you treat it."

=== General Conference session ===
When E. J. Waggoner arrived at the Conference, a blackboard had been placed on the speaker's platform with views on the law in Galatians written upon it. J. H. Morrison had affixed his signature under the statement: "Resolved — That the Law in Galatians Is the Ceremonial Law." Waggoner was invited to place his signature under the opposing proposition: "Resolved — That the Law in Galatians Is the Moral Law." Waggoner declined, saying that he had not come to the meetings to debate, but to present truth as it is found in Scripture.

Waggoner began to present what he had discovered from the Bible on the subject of Christ and His righteousness. "The preaching of the younger men (Waggoner was 33, Jones was 38) was trying to the older leaders. Their vigorous preaching somehow seemed to have a note of authority that was resented." Supported in their resistance by letters of encouragement from G.I. Butler to "stand by the old landmarks" these older men resisted what was being presented.

J. H. Morrison was selected to offer the rebuttal to Waggoner's presentations. He spoke sincerely and earnestly expressing the fear that Waggoner's view, if adopted, would direct attention away from the Adventist position of explicit obedience to all the commandments of God. When it was again Waggoner's turn at the pulpit, he and A. T. Jones offered a unique reply. Standing before the assembly they opened their Bibles and without personal comment alternately read sixteen passages bearing on the subject at hand.

Notwithstanding Ellen White's considerable influence to assist Waggoner and Jones, the debate over the law in Galatians soon became heated. Even Ellen White could not stay the negative tide that had enveloped the Conference, and she concluded, "it is evident that a delusion was upon our brethren." Although she supported and protected Waggoner and Jones as much as possible, Ellen White realized that their theological positions were being resisted by the church's leaders.

== Most Precious Message ==
The claim was that Waggoner's "new light" was nothing more than what Adventists had always presented on justification by faith, which was theoretically true as Adventist taught that salvation comes through faith in Jesus Christ, but the emphasis had tended to be more on obedience and on sanctification. Placing righteousness by faith squarely on the foundation of Christ and His righteousness, and on Christ's work as our High Priest during the antitypical Day of Atonement, brought a fresh perspective to the doctrine compared to what was previously preached from Adventist pulpits.

Ellen White saw the importance of the 1888 message Jones and Waggoner brought and why it was needed for the members can be seen in her comments on the message of righteousness by faith.

"Many had lost sight of Jesus. They needed to have their eyes directed to His divine person, His merits, and His changeless love for the human family. All power is given into His hands, that He may dispense rich gifts unto men, imparting the priceless gift of His own righteousness to the helpless human agent." Testimonies to Ministers, 92.

"The uplifted Saviour is to appear in His efficacious work as the Lamb slain, sitting upon the throne, to dispense the priceless covenant blessings, the benefits He died to purchase for every soul who should believe on Him. John could not express that love in words; it was too deep, too broad; he calls upon the human family to behold it. Christ is pleading for the church in the heavenly courts above, pleading for those for whom He paid the redemption price of His own lifeblood. Centuries, ages, can never diminish the efficacy of this atoning sacrifice. The message of the gospel of His grace was to be given to the church in clear and distinct lines, that the world should no longer say that Seventh-day Adventists talk the law, the law, but do not teach or believe Christ." Ibid.

"If Christ is all and in all to every one of us, why are not His incarnation and His atoning sacrifice dwelt upon more in the churches?" Selected Messages, vol. 3, 187.

The preachers had proclaimed with a "loud voice" the claims of the law of God, but barely an "inaudible whisper" was heard of the faith of Jesus:

"The faith of Jesus has been overlooked and treated in an indifferent, careless manner. It has not occupied the prominent position in which it was revealed to John. Faith in Christ as the sinner's only hope has been largely left out, not only of the discourses given but of the religious experience of very many who claimed to believe the third angel's message." Ibid., 168.

Thus, the Seventh-day Adventist message was in danger of becoming a lifeless, Christless message with a legalistic focus rather than Christ

"A legal religion has been thought quite the correct religion for this time. But it is a mistake. The rebuke of Christ to the Pharisees is applicable to those who have lost from the heart their first love. A cold, legal religion can never lead souls to Christ; for it is a loveless, Christless religion." Ibid., vol. l, 388.

=== The Godhead ===
Waggoner centered his logical proof on the fact that Christ, as the Son of God, possesses "all the fullness of the Godhead" being "by nature the very substance of God, and having life in Himself, He is properly called Jehovah, the self-existent One." While he rejected the idea that Christ was a created being, he maintained: "There was a time when Christ proceeded forth and came from God, from the bosom of the Father (John 8:42; 1:18), but that time was so far back in the days of eternity that to finite comprehension it is practically without beginning." The nature of the Godhead, let alone the divinity of Christ, is too complex for human comprehension. Nonetheless, Waggoner's entire discussion on Christ and His righteousness was linked to the Sonship and thus the divinity of Christ. For Waggoner, the equality of Christ with God magnifies his condescension and humility in assuming humanity. In fact, Waggoner wrote: "Let no one, therefore, who honors Christ at all, give Him less honor than he gives the Father, for this would be to dishonor the Father by just so much; but let all, with the angels in heaven worship the Son, having no fear that they are worshiping and serving the creature instead of the Creator." The everlasting covenant promise God made to fallen Adam in the Garden of Eden (Gen. 3:15) was that Emmanuel—God with us—would "save His people from their sin" (Matt. 1:21). Jesus fulfilled this promise in every aspect.

Think of it; God swore by Himself! That is, He pledged Himself, and His own existence, to our salvation in Jesus Christ. He put Himself in pawn. His life for ours, if we are lost while trusting Him. His honour is at stake.

Such an expanded concept on the length and breadth of the atonement had never been heard before from any pulpit. Ellen White declared it to be "a most precious message," a message that "was to bring more prominently before the world the uplifted Saviour, the sacrifice for the sins of the whole world. It presented justification through faith in the Surety; it invited the people to receive the righteousness of Christ, which is made manifest in obedience to all the commandments of God."

=== Foundation for Righteousness by Faith ===
Waggoner's message presented Christ as the "Saviour of man"

'Do you mean to teach universal salvation?' someone may ask. We mean to teach just what the Word of God teaches — that the 'grace of God hath appeared, bringing salvation to all men.' Titus 2:11. God has wrought out salvation for every man, and has given it to him;' but the majority spurn it and throw it away. The judgment will reveal the fact that full salvation was given to every man and that the lost have deliberately thrown away their birthright possession.

This was the message of Christ and His righteousness presented by E. J. Waggoner and A. T. Jones at the 1888 Minneapolis General Conference. Due to the conflict, Jones and Waggoner's presentations were coolly received or outrightly rejected by many of the leaders of the denomination, notwithstanding Ellen Whites words that it was the "old light", something that she had been preaching for decades. Even so, these two men were invited to preach at subsequent camp meetings, worker's meetings, and ministerial institutes over the next several years. E. J. Waggoner wrote extensively on the subject of Christ and His righteousness, developing the stenographic notes made by his wife during the 1888 conference into a book with that title. A. T. Jones would be a principal speaker at the next several General Conference sessions, and would write an exposition on the work of Christ as our High Priest relating to the perfection of Christian character, titled Consecrated Way to Christian Perfection (1901).

Ellen White supported Waggoner's and Jones' Christ-centered view on justification by faith and their refutation of Arianism, and later wrote that she had been teaching for "forty-five years" the same message as Jones and Waggoner had presented it at that session Eight years later, in 1896, Ellen White wrote, "In this scripture [Gal. 3:24], the Holy Spirit through the apostle is speaking especially of the moral law. The law reveals sin to us, and causes us to feel our need of Christ and to flee to Him for pardon and peace."

Although no manuscripts of the exact words from the 1888 conference are known to exist or preserved, save Ellen White's comments, in E. J. Waggoner's book, Christ and His Righteousness, we are given a glimpse into what might have been said. These chapters (series of articles) are the first writings of Waggoner on the subject written in the early part of 1889 just weeks after the 1888 general conference session. The focus in this book, as well as other later books, like The Gospel in Creation, contain the building blocks with a definition of a true righteousness by faith theology and experience. Namely the Holy Spirit's use of Power of the Word of God in the believer. Meaning that because the Word has innate power by virtue of its supernatural origin and through the Holy Spirit's ability to use it, forms Christ within the believer. Therefore, His righteousness internally replaces our internal unrighteousness.

This concept has been lost sight of through the years in Adventist circles. Other authors, such as Morris Venden, Hans LaRondelle, Desmond Ford and others, sort to emphasise it by promoting the classic Protestant positions on justification by faith. Others have written their own books defining the tenets of what they believe Jones and Waggoner taught as the 1888 message. One tenet of belief heavily stressed by Robert Wieland and others was "Universal Justification". This subject was not the foundation of Waggoner or Jones teaching. Both men's books taught the concept of The Power of the Word as the central key, which is absent from all books written since the second half of the 20th century that attempt to define what the 1888 message is. It is unknown why Ellen White regarded E. J. Waggoner and A. T. Jones"s sermons, at the 1888 general conference, as the beginning of the Latter Rain.

== See also ==
- Seventh-day Adventist Church
- History of the Seventh-day Adventist Church
- 28 fundamental beliefs
- Questions on Doctrine
- Biblical Research Institute
- Millerites
- William Miller (preacher)
- Ellen G. White
- Teachings of Ellen White#End times
- Inspiration of Ellen White
- List of Ellen White writings
- Ellen G. White Estate
- Prophecy in the Seventh-day Adventist Church
- Seventh-day Adventist eschatology
- Sabbath in Seventh-day Adventism
- Seventh-day Adventist worship
- Sabbath Rest Advent Church
- Historical SDA

== Bibliography ==
- Daniells, Arthur G. Christ Our Righteousness (Takoma Park, Maryland: Ministerial Association of Seventh-day Adventists, 1941).
- Ellen G. White Estate, compilers. Manuscripts and Memories of Minneapolis (Boise, Idaho: Pacific Press, 1988)
- Ferch, Arthur (ed.), Toward Righteousness by Faith: 1888 in Retrospect (1989)
- Froom, LeRoy Edwin. Movement of Destiny (Washington DC: Review and Herald, 1971).
- Knight, George. A User-Friendly Guide to the 1888 Message (Hagerstown, MD: Review and Herald, 1998)
- ________. Angry Saints: Tensions and Possibilities in the Adventist Struggle Over Righteousness by Faith (Review and Herald, 1989)
- Gresham, Joe. 1888 — The Message, The Mystery, and The Misconceptions (np, nd).
- Olson, A.V. 1888-1901: 13 Crisis Years (Washington DC: Review and Herald, 1981).
- Paxton, Geoffrey J. The Shaking of Adventism (Wilmington, Delaware: Zenith Publishers, 1977).
- Pease, Norval F. By Faith Alone (Mountain View, Calf.: Pacific Press, 1962).
- Schwarz, R. W. Light Bearers to the Remnant (Boise, Idaho: Pacific Press, 1979).
- Spalding, A.W. Captains of the Host (Washington DC: Review and Herald, 1949).
- Tarling, Lowell R. (1981). "The General Conference Session – Minneapolis 1888". The Edges of Seventh-day Adventism: A Study of Separatist Groups Emerging from the Seventh-day Adventist Church (1844–1980). Barragga Bay, Bermagui South, NSW: Galilee Publications. pp. 158–170. ISBN 0-9593457-0-1.
- Waggoner, E. J. Christ and His Righteousness (Melbourne, Aust.: Echo Publishing, 1892).
- ________. The Everlasting Covenant: God's Promises to Us (Berrien Springs, Mich.: Glad Tidings Publishers, 2002).
- ________. The Glad Tidings (Paris, Ohio: Glad Tidings Publishers, 1972).
- ________. Waggoner on Romans (Paris, Ohio: Glad Tidings Publishers, 1995).
- Wahlen, Clinton L. "Selected Aspects of Ellet J. Waggoner's Eschatology and Their Relation to His Understanding of Righteousness by Faith, 1882-1895" (M.Div. thesis, Andrews University, 1988).
- ________. "What Did E. J. Waggoner Say at Minneapolis?" Adventist Heritage 13:1 (Winter 1988): 22–37
- Wieland, Robert J. and Donald K. Short. 1888 Re-Examined (Uniontown, Ohio: The 1888 Message Study Committee, 1987).
- Robert J. Wieland book:

"The 1888 Message."

- Donald K. Short book: Why delay?.
- White, Ellen G. The Ellen G. White 1888 Materials (Washington DC: Ellen G. White Estate, 1987).
- ________. Selected Messages, vol. 1 (Washington DC: Review and Herald, 1958).
- ________. Testimonies to Ministers and Gospel Workers (Mountain View, Calif.: Pacific Press, 1962).
- Grosboll, John book:"The Church"

(Bible Institute "Step to Life" - - Historical SDA).
