= Review and Herald Publishing Association =

US Seventh-day Adventist publishing house

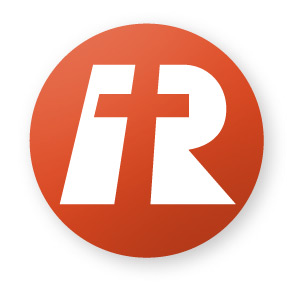
- Type: Private
- Industry: Publishing
- Genre: Religious
- Founded: Rocky Hill, Connecticut (1849)
- Founder: James White
- Headquarters: Hagerstown, Maryland, US
- Area served: World
- Key people: Mark B. Thomas, President
- Products: Books, Magazines, CDs, DVDs, Tracts
- Number of employees: 175 (2011)
- Website: www.reviewandherald.com

The Review and Herald Publishing Association was the older of two Seventh-day Adventist publishing houses in North America. The organization published books, magazines, study guides, CDs, videos and games for Adventist churches, schools and individual subscribers. It also printed and distributed the Adventist Review magazine. In 2014 the Review and Herald Publishing Association decided to remain as a publisher, but without printing and distribution facilities. It maintains a board and administrators.

== History ==
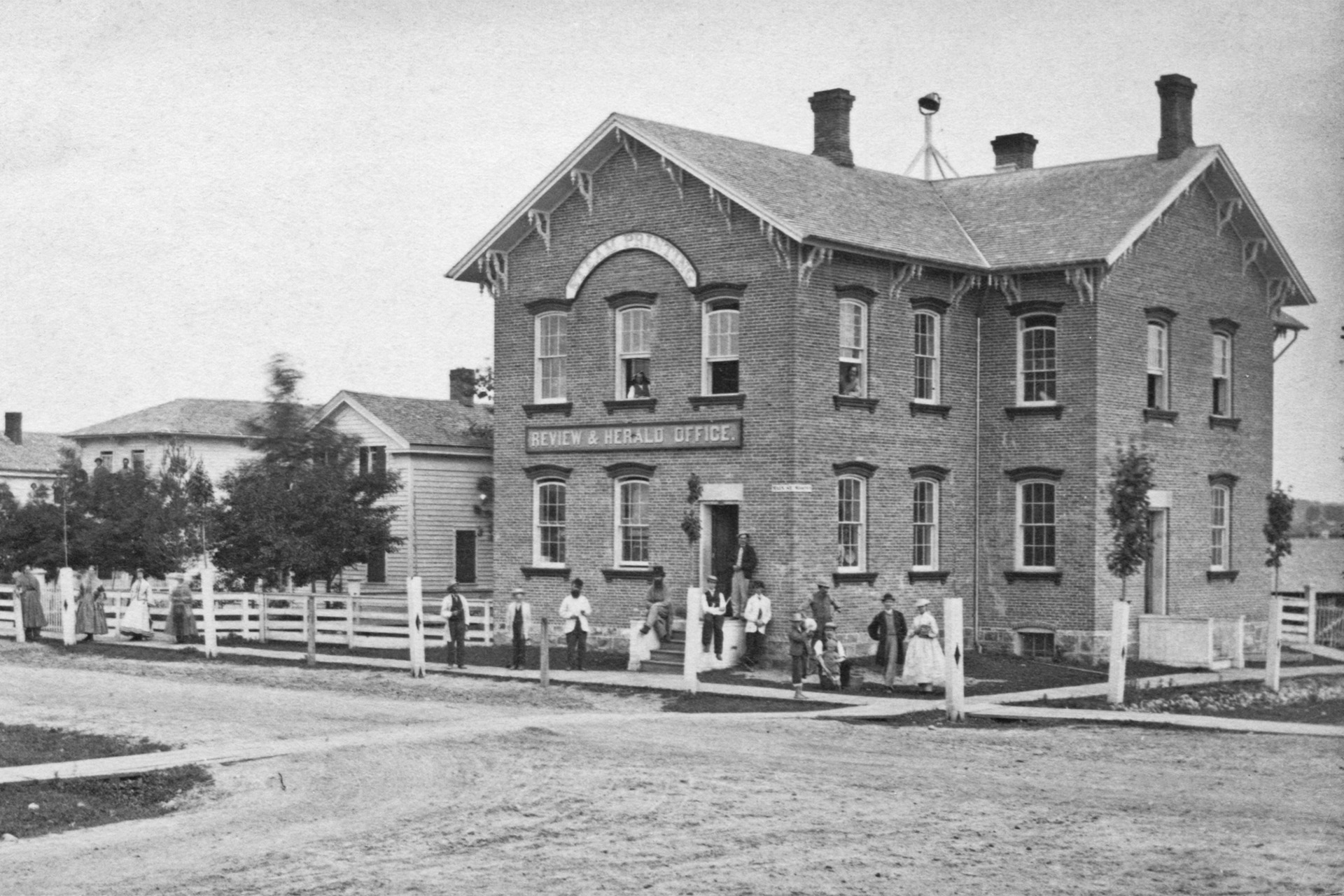
Review and Herald Publishing Association in 1868

The roots of the Review and Herald Publishing Association go back to 1849 when James White produced The Present Truth and, in 1850, The Advent Review. From there the publication house grew and moved to Battle Creek, Michigan.

A major fire on December 30, 1902, destroyed the offices. The headquarters was then moved to Takoma Park, Maryland. In the 1950s, the association developed The Bible Story by Arthur S. Maxwell. The set was notable for its size—including 411 stories from the Bible—and for having color illustrations on each page opening—an extravagant expense for a book publisher at that time.

In 1983, under the leadership of Elder Bud Otis, the organization moved to a new, $14 million facility in Hagerstown, Maryland, on a 127-acre (0.51 km^{2}) campus; at that time the publishing house had 350 employees and an annual payroll of $6.7 million.

Edson White established the Gospel Herald Publishing Company in Nashville, Tennessee, which was renamed to Southern Publishing Association in 1901. It merged with the Review and Herald in 1980.

== In creative works ==
The 2014 documentary film War in Heaven, War on Earth: The Birth of the Seventh-day Adventist Church During the American Civil War by Chris Small and Loren Small discusses the formation of the Review and Herald Publishing Association.

The Liberty magazine is published since 1906, currently having a circulation of under 200,000.

== See also ==
- List of Seventh-day Adventist periodicals
