= Ellen G. White bibliography =

Ellen G. White (November 26, 1827 – July 16, 1915), one of the founders of the Seventh-day Adventist Church, authored numerous books, pamphlets, and periodical articles.

== Books ==
This page lists White's books, their publication dates and number of pages. Approximately 180 books which identify her as author fall into two categories: (1) those published during her lifetime, i.e., until her death in 1915—a group of about 50 volumes amounting to approximately 29% of the total, and (2) those published after her death under the auspices of the Ellen G. White Estate—a group of about 130 volumes amounting to approximately 71% of the total.

Among the comprehensive bibliographies of White's writings that also include her pamphlets and periodical articles is one posted online by Loma Linda University.

Table featuring books by Ellen G. White
Title	Abb.	Year	Pages	Publisher	Note
A Word to the “Little Flock.”	WLF	1847	30	James White	Collection of writings by Joseph Bates, James White, and Ellen White
A Sketch of the Christian Experience and Views of Ellen G. White.	ExV	1851	64	James White	
Supplement to the Christian Experience and Views of Ellen G. White.	ExV54	1854	48	James White	
Testimony for the Church No. 1	T01	1855	16	Advent Review Office	
Testimony for the Church No. 2	T02	1856	16	Advent Review Office	
Testimony for the Church No. 3	T03	1857	16	Advent Review Office	
Testimony for the Church No. 4	T04	1857	39	Steam Press of the Review and Herald Office	The greater part of Testimony No. 4 was reprinted in 1860 as part of a work called Spiritual Gifts, vol. 2.
Testimony for the Church No. 5	T05	1859	32	Steam Press of the Review and Herald Office	
Testimony for the Church No. 6	T06	1861	64	Steam Press of the Review and Herald Office	
Testimony for the Church No. 7	T07	1862	63	Steam Press of the Review and Herald Office	
Testimony for the Church No. 8	T08	1862	64	Steam Press of the Seventh-Day Adventist Publishing Association	
Testimony for the Church No. 9	T09	1862	32	Steam Press of the Seventh-Day Adventist Publishing Association	
Testimony for the Church No. 10	T10	1864	64	Steam Press of the Seventh-Day Adventist Publishing Association	Testimonies Nos. 1-10, except No. 4, were reprinted in Spiritual Gifts, vol. 4, with an introductory note reading in part: "It has been thought best to re-print them, as given in the following pages, omitting local and personal matters, and giving those portions only which are of practical and general interest and importance... E.G.W."
Testimony for the Church No. 11	T11	1867	53	Steam Press of the Seventh-Day Adventist Publishing Association	
Testimony for the Church No. 12	T12	1867	96	Steam Press of the Seventh-Day Adventist Publishing Association	
Testimony for the Church No. 13	T13	1867	80	Steam Press of the Seventh-Day Adventist Publishing Association	
Testimony for the Church No. 14	T14	1868	102	Steam Press of the Seventh-Day Adventist Publishing Association	Nos. 1-14 were edited and published under title: Testimonies for the Church Volume 1 in 1885 (1T 718p).
Testimony for the Church No. 15	T15	1868	96	Steam Press of the Seventh-Day Adventist Publishing Association	
Testimony for the Church No. 16	T16	1868	104	Steam Press of the Seventh-Day Adventist Publishing Association	
Testimony for the Church No. 17	T17	1869	192	Steam Press of the Seventh-Day Adventist Publishing Association	
Testimony for the Church No. 18	T18	1870	208	Steam Press of the Seventh-Day Adventist Publishing Association	
Testimony for the Church No. 19	T19	1870	96	Steam Press of the Seventh-Day Adventist Publishing Association	
Testimony for the Church No. 20	T20	1871	199	Steam Press of the Seventh-Day Adventist Publishing Association	Nos. 15-20 were edited and published under title: Testimonies for the Church Volume 2 in 1885 (2T 712p).
Testimony for the Church No. 21	T21	1872	200	Steam Press of the Seventh-Day Adventist Publishing Association	
Testimony for the Church No. 22	T22	1873	192	Steam Press of the Review and Herald Office	
Testimony for the Church No. 23	T23	1873	116	Steam Press of the Seventh-Day Adventist Publishing Association	Plus 47 pp., separately numbered, by James White.
Testimony for the Church No. 24	T24	1875	192	Steam Press of the Seventh-Day Adventist Publishing Association	
Testimony for the Church No. 25	T25	1875	192	Steam Press of the Seventh-Day Adventist Publishing Association	Nos. 21-25 were edited and published under title: Testimonies for the Church Volume 3 in 1885 (3T 555p).
Testimony for the Church No. 26	T26	1876	208	The Pacific Press	
Testimony for the Church No. 27	T27	1876	190	The Pacific Press	
Testimony for the Church No. 28	T28	1879	192	Seventh-Day Adventist Publishing Association	
Testimony for the Church No. 29	T29	1880	192	Seventh-Day Adventist Publishing Association	
Testimony for the Church No. 30	T30	1881	192	Steam Press of the Seventh-Day Adventist Publishing Association	Nos. 26-30 were edited and published under title: Testimonies for the Church Volume 4 in 1885 (4T 657p).
Testimony for the Church No. 31	T31	1882	244	The Pacific Press Seventh-Day Adventist Publishing Association	
Testimony for the Church No. 32	T32	1885	238	The Pacific Press Seventh-Day Adventist Publishing Association	
Testimony for the Church No. 33	T33	1889	288	The Pacific Press Seventh-Day Adventist Publishing Association	Nos. 31-33 were edited and published under title: Testimonies for the Church Volume 5 in 1889 (5T 754p).
Testimony for the Church Volume 6 (No. 34)	6T	1900	482	The Pacific Press Seventh-Day Adventist Publishing Association	"No." naming convention was retained in writing 34-37, but "Volume" naming convention followed in publishing 6-9.
Testimony for the Church Volume 7 (No. 35)	7T	1902	298	The Pacific Press Seventh-Day Adventist Publishing Association	
Testimony for the Church Volume 8 (No. 36)	8T	1904	335	The Pacific Press Seventh-Day Adventist Publishing Association	
Testimony for the Church Volume 9 (No. 37)	9T	1909	288	The Pacific Press Seventh-Day Adventist Publishing Association	
The Great Controversy, Between Christ and His Angels, and Satan and His Angels.	1SG	1858	219	James White	Usually called: "Spiritual Gifts Volume 1", Preface by R.F. Cottrell
My Christian Experience, Views and Labours in Connection With the Rise and Progress of the Third Angel's Message.	2SG	1860	304	James White	Usually called: "Spiritual Gifts Volume 2"
Important Facts of Faith, in Connection With the History of Holy Men of Old.	3SG	1864	304	Seventh-Day Adventist Publishing Association	Usually called: "Spiritual Gifts Volume 3"
Important Facts of Faith: Laws of Health, and Testimonies Nos. 1-10.	4aSG, 4bSG	1864	156, 160	Seventh-Day Adventist Publishing Association	Usually called: "Spiritual Gifts Volume 4". First 119 pages continues 3SG, 120-156 are related to health, the remainder of the book is Testimony for the Church Numbers 1 to 10 with #4 omitted and some abridgements made.
The Acts of the Apostles	AA	1911	633	The Pacific Press	
The Adventist Home	AH	1952	550	Review and Herald Publishing Association	
An Appeal to Mothers	ApM	1864	63	Seventh-Day Adventist Publishing Association	
An Appeal to the Youth	AY	1864	80	Seventh-Day Adventist Publishing Association	
A Call to Medical Evangelism	CME	1933	47	Southern Publishing Association	
A Call to Stand Apart	CSA	2002	70	Review and Herald Publishing Association	
Child Guidance	CG	1954	569	Review and Herald Publishing Association	
Christ in His Sanctuary	CIHS	1969	128	Pacific Press Publishing Association	
Christian Education	CE	1894	248	International Tract Society	
Christian Experience and Teachings of Ellen G. White	CET	1922	260	Pacific Press Publishing Association	
Christian Leadership	ChL	1985	77	Ellen G. White Estate	
Christian Service	ChS	1925	275	Review and Herald Publishing Association	
Christian Temperance and Bible Hygiene	CTBH	1890	162	Good Health Publishing Co.	
Christ's Object Lessons	COL	1900	421	Review and Herald Publishing Association	
Colporteur Evangelist	CEv	1920	103	Pacific Press Publishing Association	
Colporteur Ministry	CM	1953	155	Pacific Press Publishing Association	
Confrontation	Con	1971	93	Review and Herald Publishing Association	
Counsels for the Church	CCh	1991	359	Pacific Press Publishing Association	
Counsels on Diet and Foods	CD	1938	498	Review and Herald Publishing Association	
Counsels on Health	CH	1923	634	Pacific Press Publishing Association	
Counsels on Sabbath School Work	CSW	1938	186	Review and Herald Publishing Association	
Counsels on Stewardship	CS	1940	351	Review and Herald Publishing Association	
Counsels to Parents, Teachers, and Students	CT	1913	556	Pacific Press Publishing Association	
Counsels to Writers and Editors	CW	1946	181	Southern Publishing Association	
Country Living	CL	1946	32	Review and Herald Publishing Association	
Darkness Before Dawn	DD	1997	62	Pacific Press Publishing Association	
Daughters of God	DG	1998	275	Review and Herald Publishing Association	
Desire of Ages	DA	1898	835	Pacific Press Publishing Association	
Early Writings	EW	1882	304	Review and Herald Publishing Association	
Education	Ed	1903	309	Pacific Press Publishing Association	
From Eternity Past	EP	1983	551	Pacific Press Publishing Association	
Evangelism	Ev	1946	707	Review and Herald Publishing Association	
Faith and Works	FW	1979	122	Southern Publishing Association	
Fundamentals of Christian Education	FE	1923	549	Southern Publishing Association	
God's Remnant Church	GRC	1950	63	Pacific Press Publishing Association	
Gospel Workers 1892	GW92	1892	471	Review and Herald Publishing Association	
Gospel Workers 1915	GW	1915	520	Review and Herald Publishing Association	
Great Controversy 1888	GC88	1888	691	Pacific Press Publishing Association	
Great Controversy 1911	GC	1911	694	Pacific Press Publishing Association	
Great Hope	GrH_c	2012	56	Review and Herald Publishing Association	
Health Food Ministry	HFM	1970	95	Ellen G. White Publications	
Healthful Living	HL	1897	307	Medical Missionary Board	
Heaven	Hvn	2003	192	Pacific Press Publishing Association	
From Heaven With Love	HLv	1984	556	Pacific Press Publishing Association	
Help in Daily Living	HDL	1957	64	Pacific Press Publishing Association	
From Here to Forever	HF	1982	420	Pacific Press Publishing Association	
Historical Sketches of the Foreign Missions of the Seventh-day Adventists	HS	1886	294	Imprimerie Polyglotte	
Health, or, How to Live	HHTL	1865	400	Steam Press of the Seventh-Day Adventist Publishing Association	This work was a series of six pamphlets compiled from various writers and published in book form. Ellen White contributed one article for each of the six pamphlets.
Impending Conflict	IC	1960	43	Pacific Press Publishing Association	
Last Day Events	LDE	1992	306	Pacific Press Publishing Association	
Letters to Young Lovers	LYL	1983	90	Pacific Press Publishing Association	
Life Sketches of James White and Ellen G. White 1888	LS88	1888	350	Seventh-Day Adventist Publishing Association	There is an earlier edition: LS80
Life Sketches of Ellen G. White	LS	1915	480	Pacific Press Publishing Association	
Manual for Canvassers	MC	1902	78	Pacific Press Publishing Association	
Medical Ministry	MM	1932	335	Pacific Press Publishing Association	
Messages to Young People	MYP	1930	466	Review and Herald Publishing Association	
Mind, Character, and Personality, Vol.1	1MCP	1977	369	Southern Publishing Association	
Mind, Character, and Personality, Vol.2	2MCP	1977	440	Southern Publishing Association	
Ministry of Healing	MH	1905	516	Pacific Press Publishing Association	
Ministry to the Cities	MTC	2012	195	Review and Herald Publishing Association	
New Life Revival and Beyond	NL	1972	64	Leaves-Of-Autumn Books	
Pastoral Ministry	PaM	1995	287	General Conference Ministerial Association	
Patriarchs and Prophets	PP	1890	764	Review and Herald Publishing Association	Subtitle: The Great Conflict Between Good and Evil as Illustrated in the Lives of Holy Men of Old.
Peter's Counsel to Parents	PCP	1981	62	Review and Herald Publishing Association	
Prayer	Pr	2002	320	Pacific Press Publishing Association	
Principles for Christian Leaders	PCL	2018	309	Pacific Press Publishing Association	
Prophets and Kings	PK	1917	733	Pacific Press Publishing Association	
Publishing Ministry	PM	1983	404	Review and Herald Publishing Association	
Retirement Years	RY	1990	224	Review and Herald Publishing Association	
Sanctified Life	SL	1889	96	Review and Herald Publishing Association	
Selected Messages Book 1	1SM	1958	416	Review and Herald Publishing Association	
Selected Messages Book 2	2SM	1958	488	Review and Herald Publishing Association	
Selected Messages Book 3	3SM	1980	465	Review and Herald Publishing Association	
Sketches from the Life of Paul	LP	1883	334	Review and Herald Publishing Association	
Solemn Appeal	SA	1870	181	Seventh-Day Adventist Publishing Association	
Southern Work	SWk	1901	96	Review and Herald Publishing Association	
Special Testimonies on Education	SpTEd	1897	240	???	
Spirit of Prophecy Vol. 1	1SP	1870	414	Seventh-Day Adventist Publishing Association	Subtitle: The Great Controversy Between Christ and His Angels and Satan and His Angels. Covers from creation to time of Solomon.
Spirit of Prophecy Vol. 2	2SP	1877	398	Seventh-Day Adventist Publishing Association	Subtitle: The Great Controversy Between Christ and Satan. Life, Teachings and Miracles of Our Lord Jesus Christ. Covers from first advent of Christ to his ride into Jerusalem.
Spirit of Prophecy Vol. 3	3SP	1878	392	Seventh-Day Adventist Publishing Association	Subtitle: The Great Controversy Between Christ and Satan. The Death, Resurrection and Ascension of Our Lord Jesus Christ. Covers from Christ entering Jerusalem to time of Paul and Silas.
Spirit of Prophecy Vol. 4	4SP	1884	506	Seventh-Day Adventist Publishing Association	Subtitle: The Great Controversy Between Christ and Satan From the Destruction of Jerusalem to the End of the Controversy. Covers destruction of Jerusalem to new Earth.
From Splendor to Shadow	SS	1984	377	Pacific Press Publishing Association	Condensed Prophets and Kings.
Steps to Christ	SC	1892	126	Pacific Press Publishing Association	First chapter in current edition was not in 1892 edition. This is perhaps the most printed and translated work of Ellen White.
Story of Hope	SH	2016	126	Pacific Press Publishing Association	
Story of Jesus	SJ	1900	186	Southern Publishing Association	Parts of Desire of Ages adapted for children.
Story of Redemption	SR	1947	433	Review and Herald Publishing Association	
Temperance	Te	1949	292	Pacific Press Publishing Association	
Testimonies on Sabbath-School Work	TSS	1900	122	Review and Herald Publishing Association	
Testimonies on Sexual Behavior, Adultery, and Divorce	TSB	1989	270	Ellen G. White Estate	
Testimonies to Ministers and Gospel Workers	TM	1923	535	Pacific Press Publishing Association	
Testimonies to Southern Africa	TSA	1977	98	South African Union Conference of Seventh-day Adventists	
Testimony Studies on Diet and Foods	TSDF	1926	199	Loma Linda College of Medical Evangelists	Precursor to Counsels on Diet and Foods.
Testimony Treasures Vol. 1	1TT	1949	605	Pacific Press Publishing Association	Condensed selection from Testimonies for the Church.
Testimony Treasures Vol. 2	2TT	1949	575	Pacific Press Publishing Association	Condensed selection from Testimonies for the Church.
Testimony Treasures Vol. 3	3TT	1949	591	Pacific Press Publishing Association	Condensed selection from Testimonies for the Church.
Thoughts from the Mount of Blessing	MB	1896	152	Pacific Press Publishing Association	
From Trials to Triumph	TT	1984	314	Pacific Press Publishing Association	
True Revival	TR	2010	96	Review and Herald Publishing Association	
Truth About Angels	TA	1996	302	Pacific Press Publishing Association	
Voice in Speech and Song	VSS	1988	469	Pacific Press Publishing Association	
Welfare Ministry	WM	1952	340	Review and Herald Publishing Association	
Redemption: or the First Advent of Christ, With His Life and Ministry	1Red	1877	104	Seventh-Day Adventist Publishing Association	
Redemption: or the Temptation of Christ in the Wilderness	2Red	1874	96	Seventh-Day Adventist Publishing Association	
Redemption: or the Teachings of Christ, the Anointed One	3Red	1877	128	Seventh-Day Adventist Publishing Association	
Redemption: or the Miracles of Christ, the Mighty One	4Red	1877	126	Seventh-Day Adventist Publishing Association	
Redemption: or the Sufferings of Christ; His Trial and Crucifixion	5Red	1877	96	Seventh-Day Adventist Publishing Association	
Redemption: or the Resurrection of Christ; and His Ascension	6Red	1877	80	Seventh-Day Adventist Publishing Association	
Redemption: or the Ministry of Peter and the Conversion of Saul	7Red	1878	78	Seventh-Day Adventist Publishing Association	
Redemption: or the Teachings of Paul, and His Mission to the Gentiles	8Red	1878	80	Seventh-Day Adventist Publishing Association	
