= Arthur S. Maxwell =

British writer (1896–1970)

Arthur Stanley Maxwell (January 14, 1896 – November 13, 1970), otherwise known as Uncle Arthur, was an author, editor, and administrator of the Seventh-day Adventist Church.

== Biography ==
Maxwell was born in London, England. During his teenage years he was schooled at Stanborough College upon the insistence of his mother. At age 16, Maxwell worked for a period as a literature evangelist, before becoming a copyreader at Stanborough Press. On May 3, 1917, Maxwell married Rachel Elizabeth Joyce, a proofreader at the office, with whom he had four sons and two daughters.

Maxwell began writing articles for British Adventist journal The Present Truth. During this period he also had articles published in the Signs of the Times. In 1920, Maxwell became editor of The Present Truth and until 1927 was also manager and treasurer of the Stanborough Press, pastor of a nearby church, official Adventist spokesman for church-state affairs in Britain, and editor of a health journal.

In 1936, Maxwell and his family moved from England to Palo Alto, California, in the United States. There he took a job as editor of the very publication that had published his first serious adult article – Signs of the Times. When he arrived, circulation of the magazine stood at 55,000. When Maxwell retired 34 years later, the circulation of the Signs of the Times magazine had increased to 335,000.

== Bibliography ==
- Arthur, Maxwell (1980). The Bible Story Ten Volume Set (Hardcover ed.). Pacific Press Publishing; 23rd edition. ISBN 0-8280-1265-2.
- Arthur, Maxwell (1976). Bedtime Stories (Hardcover ed.). Pacific Press Publishing.
- Arthur, Maxwell. BIBLE HEROES: Adventures of Great Men and Women of God (Hardcover ed.). Review and Herald Publishing.
- Arthur, Maxwell. JESUS FRIEND OF CHILDREN: Stories for Young Readers (Hardcover ed.). Review & Herald.
- Arthur, Maxwell. Kid's Klassic THE SECRET OF THE CAVE (Paperback ed.). Pacific Press Publishing.
- Arthur, Maxwell (1989). Uncle Arthur's Storytime: Children's True Adventures (Paperback ed.). Review and Herald Publishing; Classic ed edition. ISBN 187777300X.
