= Seventh Day Adventist Reform Movement =

Pacifist Christian denomination (1920-)

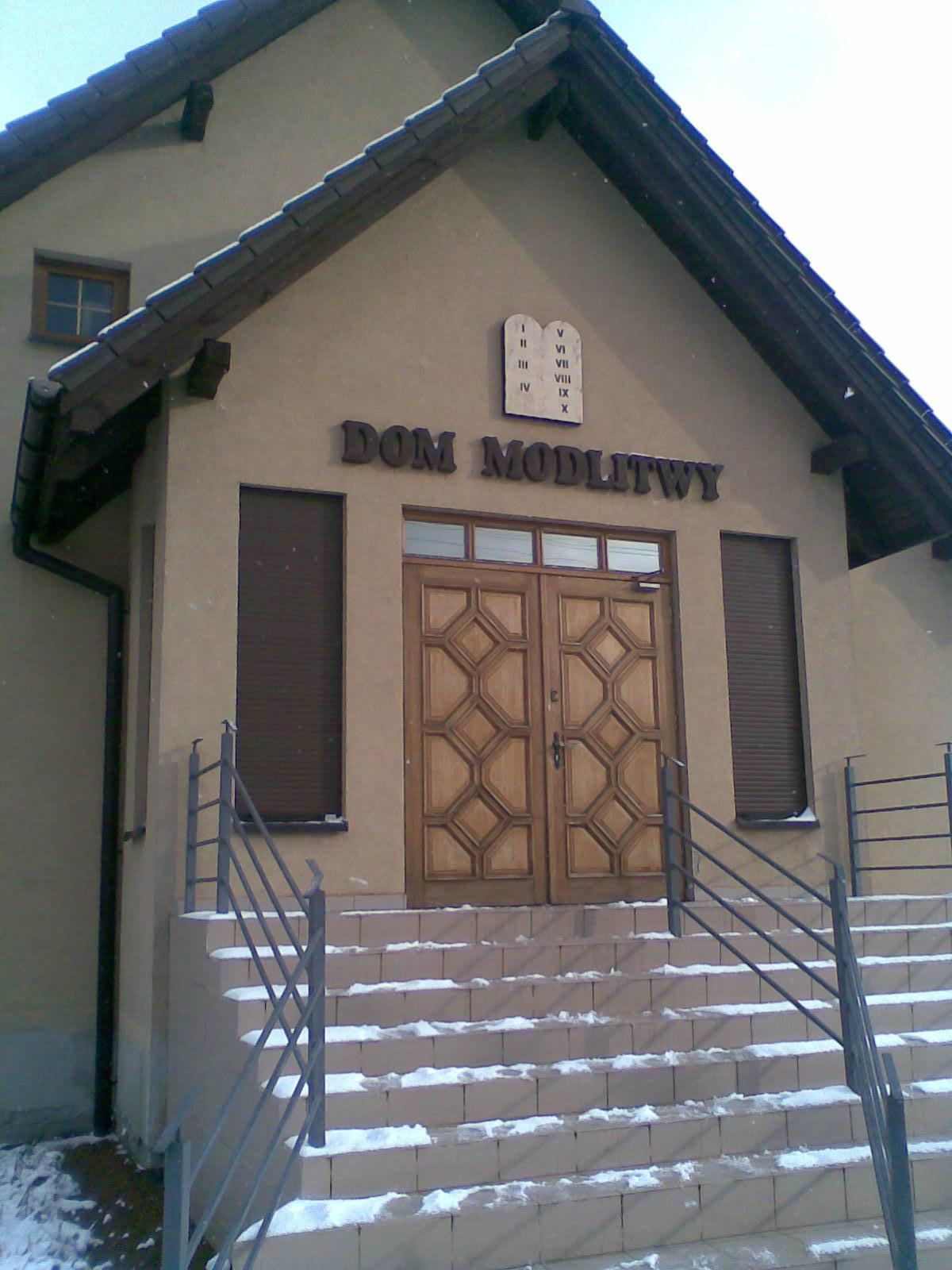
- Seventh Day Adventist Reform Movement Church in Ruda Śląska, Poland
- Classification: Protestant
- Orientation: Adventist, Arminian, Christian pacifist
- Polity: Modified presbyterian polity
- Associations: SDARM General Conference; International Missionary Society SDARM
- Region: Worldwide (132 countries)
- Founder: Ludwig R. Conradi, Otto Welp, and other European leaders
- Origin: 1925; Gotha, Germany
- Separated from: Seventh-day Adventist Church
- Members: 42,285
- Other name: Reformed Adventist Church (informal)
- Official website: legacy.sdarm.org

The Seventh Day Adventist Reform Movement is a Protestant Christian denomination in the Sabbatarian Adventist movement that formed from a schism in the European Seventh-day Adventist Church during World War I over the position its European church leaders took on Sabbath observance and on committing Adventists to the bearing of arms in military service for Imperial Germany in World War I.

The movement was formerly organised on an international level in 1925 at Gotha, Germany, and adopted the name "Seventh Day Adventist Reform Movement". It was first registered as a General Conference association in 1929 in Burgwedel, near Hanover, Germany. Following the General Conference association's dissolution by the Gestapo in 1936 it was re-registered in Sacramento, California, United States in 1949. Its present world headquarters are in Roanoke, Virginia, USA.

The Seventh Day Adventist Reform Movement is governed by a General Conference, a worldwide association of constituent territorial Units consisting of Union Conferences, State/Field Conferences, Mission Fields and Missions not attached to any other unit. Through its local church congregations and groups of adherents, affiliated publishing houses, schools, health clinics and hospitals, the Seventh Day Adventist Reform Movement is active in over 132 countries of the world.

The movement's beliefs largely reflect its distinctive Seventh-day Adventist Church heritage and foundational pillars, with some small divergences. See the "Beliefs" section below.

== History ==
=== 1914–1918 schism and early history ===
The Seventh Day Adventist Reform Movement came about as a result of the actions of L. R. Conradi and certain European church leaders during the World War I, who decided that it was acceptable for Adventists to take part in war, which was in clear opposition to the historical position of the church that had always upheld the non-combative position. Since the American Civil War, Adventists were known as non-combatants, and had done work in hospitals or given medical care rather than combat roles. The Seventh-day Adventist leaders in Europe when the war began, determined on their own that it was permissible for Adventists to bear arms and serve in the military and other changes which went against traditional Adventist beliefs.

The General Conference of Seventh-day Adventists sent Seventh-day Adventist minister and General Conference Secretary William Ambrose Spicer to investigate the changes these leaders had instituted, but was unable to undo what L. R. Conradi and the others had done during the war.

After the war, some disfellowshipped Adventists in Germany had organize in 1919 as Internationale Missionnsgesellshaft der Siebententags Adventisten Alte seit 1844 stehengebliebene Richtung Deutsche Union (International Missionary Society of Seventh-day Adventists, old movement standing firm since 1844). The Seventh-day Adventist church sent a delegation of four brethren from the General Conference (Arthur G. Daniells who was president of General Conference of Seventh-day Adventists, L. H. Christian, F. M. Wilcox, M. E. Kern) in July 1920, who came to a Ministerial Meeting in Friedensau with the hope of a reconciliation. Before the 200 Pastors and the Brethren from the General Conference present at this meeting, its European church leaders, G. Dail, L. R. Conradi, H. F. Schuberth, and P. Drinhaus withdrew their statement about military service and apologized for what they had done. The Reformers were informed of this and the next day saw a meeting by the Adventist brethren with the Reform-Adventists. A. G. Daniells urged them to return to the Seventh-day Adventist church, but the Reform-Adventists maintained that the European church leaders had forsaken the truth during the war and the reconciliation failed. Soon after they began to form a separate group from the official Adventist church.

In November 18, 1921 representatives from different countries meet in Wurzburg, Germany, discussed their Principles of Faith, in harmony with the three angel’s messages based on the Bible and Testimony. At that same time, Otto Welp was elected as the leader of their General Conference.

On 1925, the General Conference again convened, in Gotha, Thuringen, Germany. During this meeting they adopted their Principles of Faith that was discussed on 1921, and they approved as well to published the adopted principles under the publication title, The Principles of Faith of the Seventh Day Adventist Reform Movement and Constitution. During this meeting, there was no discussion of any change of the name used by the Movement, which was International Missionary Society of the Seventh day Adventist Reform Movement. On June 24–30 1928, a General Conference meeting was held in Isernhagen, Germany. On this meeting, the delegates approved to register the General Conference legally, and on 1929, the General Conference finally got registered. The name of the General Conference is the International Missionary Society of the Seventh Day Adventist Reform Movement, General Conference.

In April 1936, the Nazi government confiscated all General Conference property in Germany. Many leaders and followers died in concentration camps. Some of them were allegedly denounced by members and leaders of the Seventh-day Adventist Church. From 1936 until the conclusion of the World War II, there was no legally registered SDARM General Conference entity anywhere in the world, and would not be until 1949. The international situation during those years prevented the convening of a General Conference Session.

In 1926, Heinrich Ostwald—a Russian-German pastor in the Soviet Union—established and led the Russian Field of the Seventh Day Adventist Reform Movement following contacts with Reform-Adventists in Germany and having obtained Otto Welp's consent to work as a preacher for the movement; after several years of imprisonment, he formed the All-Russian Union of Adventist Reformers in 1936, but was arrested the following year and died during the investigation. Later, a related group which also came about for the same reasons was the True and Free Seventh-day Adventists (TFSDA) which formed in the USSR, whose most well known leader was Vladimir Shelkov.

=== 1951 schism ===
A major division then took place within the Seventh Day Adventist Reform Movement itself at its General Conference session held at Zeist, Utrecht (province), Netherlands in 1951. The cause for the division involved tensions that had arisen over unresolved issues of the preceding years. Charges of arbitrariness and authoritarianism by the Seventh Day Adventist Reform Movement leader and on the part of the General Conference administration towards member Units, failures by the General Conference committee to adequately resolve moral failings among leaders, issues concerning mal-administration of Church finances, and procedural and organisational irregularities prior to and during the Session itself are cited by the present organisation as significant contributing factors.

After two weeks of deliberations within the Session trying to resolve some of these tensions, a move was made by a number of delegates to read a declaration enumerating the main problems involved and requesting that a committee to address the entire situation be established. The motion carried on the first vote but was overturned by the chairman. To signify their protest at what was held to be an arbitrary decision of the chair, 45% of delegates present, led by the then Secretary of the General Conference, left the Session room. The Session's proceedings faltered at this point. Efforts to reconcile the situation while all delegates were still present in Netherlands failed.

Another factor affecting the administration of the Session at the time was the international situation behind the Iron Curtain. Many of the units attached to the General Conference were unable to send delegates to the Zeist session due to restrictions on religious bodies in communist lands. Proxy letters from a number of Union Conferences were held by the General Conference Secretary enabling the session to convene legally (a provision enabled in the 1949 corporate registration), though the proxy holder still only had one vote regardless of the number of proxies held. Those Units not represented directly accounted for approximately 60% of the organization's membership. Consequently, neither of the two factions that became evident at the Zeist session were in a position to make any unilateral decisions.

Over the course of the next year, steps were taken by both parties to explain the situation to their respective member bodies (Union Conferences) that were affiliated up until this time to the one worldwide church administration. Both factions re-organised themselves as General Conference committees independently of each other and proceeded to take the oversight of the SDARM General Conference affairs.

==== SDARM General Conference Headquarters in Roanoke, Virginia, USA ====
The Seventh Day Adventist Reform Movement had been first registered as a general conference association in Burgwedel, near Hanover, Germany in 1929. Though never approved by the inaugural 1925 Gotha SDARM General Conference Session, the designation "International Missionary Society" was added to the beginning of the name. The full registered name at that time took the form "International Missionary Society, Seventh-day Adventist Reform Movement, General Conference". The reasons for adding the designation to the beginning of the name were purely pragmatic, and done in the interests of securing General Conference finances on loan to one of its member Units, namely the German Union Conference. The SDARM General Conference operated under this German registration until 1936 when the association was dissolved by the Gestapo.

In 1948, the first post-war General Conference session was held, that the delegates agreed to re-register the worldwide interests of the Seventh Day Adventist Reform Movement by incorporating the SDARM General Conference as an association in the USA. They also agreed to do this "under the name that was adopted by the General Conference delegation in session in 1925". This decision was carried out in 1949. The registered name was now correctly, "Seventh Day Adventist Reform Movement General Conference." It was under the By-Laws of this newly incorporated body that the 1951 Zeist General Conference Session was convened.

By 1951 the SDARM General Conference affairs and financial interests were formally associated with the USA registered entity. Consequently, in the aftermath of the Zeist session, legal proceedings to establish the recognized administrators of the registered General Conference corporate entity commenced. These proceedings were finalised in May 1952 in an out-of-court agreement between the two factions. Representatives of the faction that had engaged in the protest walk-out in 1951 were left in control of the registered SDARM General Conference association.

By 1955, when the next Session of Seventh Day Adventist Reform Movement General Conference convened under the auspices the USA registered association, delegates present represented "9000 members (1000 less than in 1951)". This was a representation of 90% of the worldwide church membership recorded prior to the 1951 division.

==== International Missionary Society (IMSSDARM) Headquarters in Cedartown, Georgia, USA ====
Following the 1952 legal proceedings, in June of that year, representatives of the faction that had been the subject of the protest at Zeist conducted a second re-organisation. To distinguish themselves from their opposing faction, they adopted the name "International Missionary Society, Seventh-day Adventist Reform Movement, General Conference" with headquarters in Mosbach, Baden in Germany. As mentioned previously, the Seventh Day Adventist Reform Movement, as a general conference association, had been registered under this name in Germany in 1929 and operated under that name until 1936 when the association was dissolved by the Gestapo. "International Missionary Society" was a name that had been associated with the German Union Conference of the Seventh-Day Adventist Reform Movement from its inception in 1919. As the inaugural 1925 SDARM General Conference session did not agree to use this designation in its official name, the 1949 registered entity did not use it. With the opposing faction now adopting this designation and adding it to the 1925 agreed name, the designation "International Missionary Society" thereafter became associated exclusively with those affiliated with the interests of that faction.

While local church congregations use the name Seventh Day Adventist Reform Movement, those affiliated with the International Missionary Society General Conference also combine the designation "International Missionary Society" into their name to distinguish themselves from SDARM General Conference Units.

==== Post-1952 re-unification attempts ====
With both factions formally organized, affiliations of Union and Field Conferences associated under one or the other of the two corporate administrations. Though they remained separate both in administration and worship, the theological beliefs espoused by each entity's adherents were common to both. Despite this common platform of belief, tensions from the 1951 schism continued to remain high. Consequently, official efforts in 1967 and again in 1993 to reconcile both administrations at a General Conference level were unsuccessful.

==== Post–World War II relations with Seventh-day Adventist Church ====
In 2005, the mainstream Seventh-day Adventist church tried to make amends and apologized for its failures during World War II, as the issue from the actions of L. R. Conradi continued during that war also. Some members see it as the first attempts to reconcile the Seventh Day Adventist Reform Movement with the mainstream Seventh-day Adventist church. However, the actions of the SDA Church towards those who took a conscientious stand against all military service during World War I, were not acknowledged in the apology. The position of the SDA Church towards those engaged in military service, particularly combatants, remains an unresolved issue today.

== Beliefs ==
The Seventh Day Adventist Reform Movement (SDARM General Conference) identifies itself with a conservative Seventh-day Adventist theological and eschatological heritage. While it holds to the basic tenets of the Seventh-day Adventist faith, commonly referred to as the pillars or landmarks of the faith for these landmark teachings, there is a divergence in degree on some post-1914 doctrinal positions taken by L. R. Conradi and some of the European church leaders of the Seventh-day Adventist Church in both interpretation and application.

The Seventh Day Adventist Reform Movement's official position as conscientious objectors in relation to war and military service reflects the pacifist position of the Seventh-day Adventist Church during the 1861-1865 American Civil War. This is in direct response to what L. R. Conradi and others presented to the members and distinct from the official Seventh-day Adventist Church position which is one of non-combatancy, though in practice Seventh-day Adventist members have served in combatant roles in the military services.

Other divergences include the Seventh Day Adventist Reform Movement's positions on divorce and remarriage, closed communion, the sealing work of Revelation 7 (the SDARM holding to a pre-1914 view of its literal and number-limited nature), and the remnant church of Revelation 12:17.

The Seventh Day Adventist Reform Movement, as does the official Seventh-day Adventist Church, maintains the belief that Ellen G. White, a co-founder of the Seventh-day Adventist Church, manifested the New Testament "Gift of Prophecy". Though she had died before the formation of the SDA Reform Movement, her inspired writings, commonly referred to as testimonies, are held in the highest regard by the movement as a whole. Consistent with the Seventh-day Adventist Church, the SDA Reform Movement believes her inspired works do not take the place of the Bible. Rather they are considered a help to the believing church in bringing men and women back to the neglected truths of the Bible, with an emphasis on the need for professed believers to be faithful in the practice of its principles.

Whereas the Seventh-day Adventist church emphasises the message of the three angels of Revelation 14:6-12, the Reform Movement places a distinct emphasis on a fourth angelic message based on Revelation 18:1-4. The movement claims that the message of this other angel was first given at 1888 Minneapolis General Conference of the Seventh-day Adventist Church. This claim is maintained by the Seventh Day Adventist Reform Movement as the unique purpose for its existence as a distinct organisation separate from the Seventh-day Adventist Church. The message is captured in the expression "Christ our Righteousness", the foundation for "Justification by Faith".

Aside from the divergences, an examination of the SDA Reform Movement's published beliefs, indicate many similarities in theology with the traditional Seventh-day Adventist beliefs and also the more conservative Historic Adventism and Last Generation Theology wings of the Seventh-day Adventist Church.

A list of beliefs, along with an expanded explanation, may be viewed online.

== Officers ==
President
Term	President	Nationality
1925–1934	Otto Welp	Germany
1934–1942	Wilhelm Maas	Germany
1942–1948	Albert Mueller	Germany
1948–1951	Carlos Kozel	Germany
1951–1959	Dumitru Nicolici	Romania
1959–1963	Andre Lavrik	Romania
1963–1967	Clyde T. Stewart	Australia
1967–1979	Francisco Devai	Brazil
1979–1983	Wilhelm Volpp	Germany
1983–1991	João Moreno	Brazil
1991–1995	Neville S. Brittain	Australia
1995–2003	Alfredo Carlos Sas	Brazil
2003–2011	Duraisamy Sureshkumar	India
2011–2019	Davi Paes Silva	Brazil
2019–present	Eli Tenorio	Brazil

Vice-President
Term	Name	Nationality
1928–1931	Wilhelm Maas	Germany
1931–1948	vacant	
1948–1951	Albert Mueller	Germany
1951–1959	Andre Lavrik	Romania
1959–1963	Dumitru Nicolici	Romania
1963–1967	Emmerich Kanyo Benedek	Brazil
1967–1971	Ivan W. Smith	Australia
1971–1979	Wilhelm Volpp	Germany
1979–1987	Francisco Devai Lucacin	Brazil
1987–1995	Daniel Dumitru	Argentina
1995–1997	Neville S. Brittain - First Vice-President	Australia
1995–1999	Duraisamy Sureshkumar - Second Vice-President	India
1999–2003	Duraisamy Sureshkumar - First Vice-President	India
1999–2007	Branislav Jaksic - Second Vice President	Australia
2003–2011	Davi Paes Silva - First Vice-President	Brazil
2007–2015	Peter Daniel Lausevic - Second Vice-President	Australia
2011–2015	Duraisamy Sureshkumar - First Vice-President	India
2015–2019	Peter Daniel Lausevic - First Vice-President	Australia
2019–2025	Rolly Dumaguit - First Vice-President	Philippine
2025–present	David Zic - First vice-president	Canadá

Secretary
Term	Secretary	Nationality
1925–1934	Wilhelm Maas	Germany
1934–1948	Alfred Rieck	Germany
1948–1951	Dumitru Nicolici	Romania
1951–1955	Clyde T. Stewart	Australia
1955–1963	Ivan W. Smith	Australia
1963–1967	Alfons Balbach	Lituania
1967–1971	Alex Norman Macdonald	USA
1971–1980	Alfons Balbach	Lituania
1980–1987	Alex Norman Macdonald	USA
1987–1995	Alfredo Carlos Sas	Brazil
1995–1999	Davi Paes Silva	Brazil
1999–2001	John Garbi	USA
2001–2003	Benjamin Burec	USA
2003–2007	David Zic	Canada
2007–2011	Paul Balbach	USA
2011–2019	Eli Tenorio	Brazil
2019–Present	Liviu Tudoroiu	Romania

== General Conference Sessions ==
–	Year	City	Country
1.	1925	Gotha	Germany
2.	1928	Isernhagen	Germany
3.	1931	Isernhagen	Germany
4.	1934	Budapest	Hungary
5.	1948	The Hague	Netherlands
6.	1951	Zeist	Netherlands
7.	1955	São Paulo	Brazil
8.	1959	São Paulo	Brazil
9.	1963	Groß-Gerau	Germany
10.	1967	São Paulo	Brazil
11.	1971	Brasília	Brazil
12.	1975	Brasília	Brazil
13.	1979	Bushkill Falls	United States
14.	1983	Puslinch	Canada
15.	1987	Bragança Paulista	Brazil
16.	1991	Breuberg	Germany
17.	1995	Voineasa	Romania
18.	1999	Itu	Brazil
19.	2003	Itu	Brazil
20.	2007	Jeju	South Korea
21.	2011	Sebiu	Romania
22.	2015	Roanoke	United States
23.	2019	itu	Brazil
24.	2025	(Medellín)	Colombia

== See also ==
- SDARM General Conference
- International Missionary Society
- SDARM Units
- Seventh-day Adventist Church
- History of the Seventh-day Adventist Church
- List of religions and religious denominations#Adventist and related churches
- List of Christian denominations#Millerites and comparable groups
- Seventh-day Adventist interfaith relations – for relations with other Protestants and Catholics
- Sabbath in Seventh-day Adventism
- Seventh-day Adventist eschatology
- Seventh-day Adventist theology
- Seventh-day Adventist worship
- Ellen G. White
- Teachings of Ellen White#End times
- Inspiration of Ellen White
- Prophecy in the Seventh-day Adventist Church

== Sources ==
- Balbach, Alfons (1999). History of the Seventh Day Adventist Reform Movement. Roanoke, Va: Reformation Herald Publishing Association.
- Kramer, Helmut H. (1988). The Seventh Day Adventist Reform Movement (German Reform). Washington, DC: Biblical Research Institute, General Conference of Seventh-day Adventists.
- Neufeld, Don F.; et al., eds. (1996) [1976]. Seventh-day Adventist Encyclopedia. Commentary Reference series, 10 (2nd rev. ed.). Hagerstown, Md: Review & Herald Publishing Association. ISBN 0-8280-0918-X.
- Tarling, Lowell R. (1981). "The Seventh Day Adventist Reform Movement". The Edges of Seventh-day Adventism: A Study of Separatist Groups Emerging from the Seventh-day Adventist Church (1844–1980). Barragga Bay, Bermagui, NSW: Galilee Publications. pp. 100–12. ISBN 0-9593457-0-1.
