= True and Free Seventh-day Adventists =

Russian pacifist denomination (c. 1915-)

The True and Free Seventh-day Adventists (TFSDA) are a splinter group formed as the result of a schism within the Seventh-day Adventist Church in Europe during World War I over the position its European church leaders took, whose most well known leader was Vladimir Shelkov. TFSDA members are part of the Sabbatarian adventist movement, and believe that as a result of the decisions the European church leaders took, the Seventh-day Adventist Church had strayed from her Pillars of Adventism or foundational pillars of belief.

== Overview ==
The group related its origins to the Seventh Day Adventist Reform Movement which formed in Germany during the period of World War I, when its European church leaders determined it was permissible for Adventists to bear arms and serve in the military, and to disregard the Sabbath during the war, which went against what the church believed.

The Seventh Day Adventist Reform Movement was formerly organised on an international level in 1925 at Gotha, Germany, and appears to have been the catalyst for the formation of the TFSDA and both held to the core beliefs of a Protestant Christian denomination, part of the Sabbatarian adventist movement. The movement group in Germany adopted the name "Seventh Day Adventist Reform Movement" while that in Russian appears to have adopted the similar "True and Free Seventh-day Adventists". While the Seventh Day Adventist Reform Movement in Germany registered as a General Conference of Seventh-day Adventists association in 1929, the TFSDA was organized but did not do the same.

Much like in Russia, the crackdown on the Reform Movement in Germany began with the General Conference association's dissolution by the Gestapo in 1936 but it was re-registered in Sacramento, California, United States, in 1949 so was more familiar and became better known in America than the TFSDA.

Both the TFSDA and the Seventh Day Adventist Reform movement's beliefs largely reflect its distinctive Seventh-day Adventist Church heritage, with some small divergences.

== History of the schism ==
=== 1914–1918 Seventh-day Adventist Church Schism (Europe) ===
The Seventh Day Adventist Reform Movement came about as a result of the actions of L. R. Conradi and certain European church leaders during the war, who decided that it was acceptable for Adventists to take part in war, which was in clear opposition to the historical position of the church that had always upheld the non-combative position. Since the American Civil War, Adventists were known as non-combatants, and had done work in hospitals or to give medical care rather than combat roles.

The General Conference of Seventh-day Adventists sent Seventh-day Adventist minister and General Conference Secretary William Ambrose Spicer to investigate the changes, but was unable to change what L. R. Conradi and the others had done during the war. After the war, the Seventh-day Adventist Church sent a delegation of four brethren from the General Conference (Arthur Daniells, L. H. Christian, F. M. Wilcox, M. E. Kern) in July 1920, who came to a Ministerial Meeting in Friedensau with the hope of a reconciliation. Before the 200 pastors and the brethren from the General Conference present at this meeting, its European church leaders G. Dail, L. R. Conradi, H. F. Schuberth, and P. Drinhaus withdrew their statement about military service and apologized for what they had done. The Reformers were informed of this and the next day saw a meeting by the Adventist brethren with the Reform-Adventists. Daniells urged them to return to the Seventh-day Adventist Church, but the Reform-Adventists maintained that the European church leaders had forsaken the truth in their changes during the war and the reconciliation failed.

== TFSDA in the Soviet Union ==
Leaders of the TFSDA movement were vigorously hunted by the KGB (national security agency) and almost without exception, pastors and leaders of this church spent many years in prison, their children were taken from them and forced into exile. Three prominent leaders of the TFSDA in the USSR were V. A. Shelkov and two brothers named Murkin.

The True and Free Seventh-day Adventists continue today in small numbers. The group focuses its outreach on members of the regular Seventh-day Adventist Church and expects to see an imminent return of religious persecution.

== See also ==
- History of the Seventh-day Adventist Church

== Bibliography ==
- Ludmilla Alexeyeva, "Human Rights and the True and Free Adventists". Spectrum 19:2 (November 1988), pp. 25–32.
- Gary Land, Historical Dictionary of Seventh-day Adventists, 2005, p. 254
