= Burton L. Mack =

American biblical scholar (1931–2022)

- Born: 1931
- Died: 2022
- Occupation: author

Burton L. Mack (1931 – March 9, 2022) was an American author and scholar of early Christian history and the New Testament. He was John Wesley Professor emeritus in early Christianity at the Claremont School of Theology in Claremont, California. Mack was primarily a scholar of Christian origins, approaching it from the angle of social group formation. Mack's approach was skeptical, and he saw traditional Christian documents like the Gospels as myth as opposed to history. He viewed the gospels more as charter documents of the early Christian movements, not as reliable accounts of the life of Jesus.

In the field of religious studies more generally, Mack was known for popularizing the term "Social Formation," originally coming from the work of Louis Althusser, as a descriptive category for religion. This stems from his development of a theory of religion as "social interests." Along with his close friend Jonathan Z. Smith, Mack was active in the Redescribing Christian Origins Group of the Society of Biblical Literature.

Mack died on March 9, 2022, at the age of 90.

== Works ==
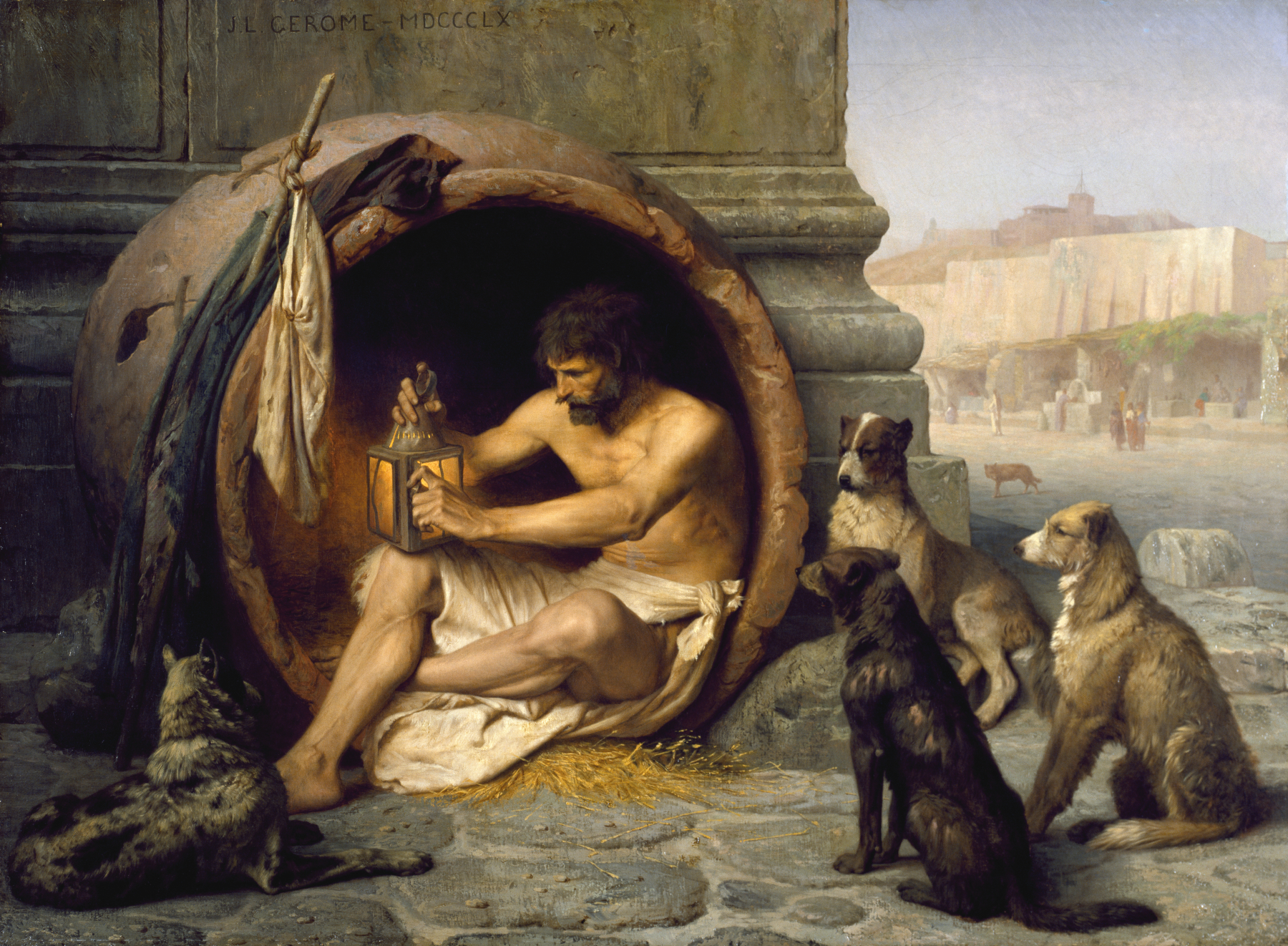
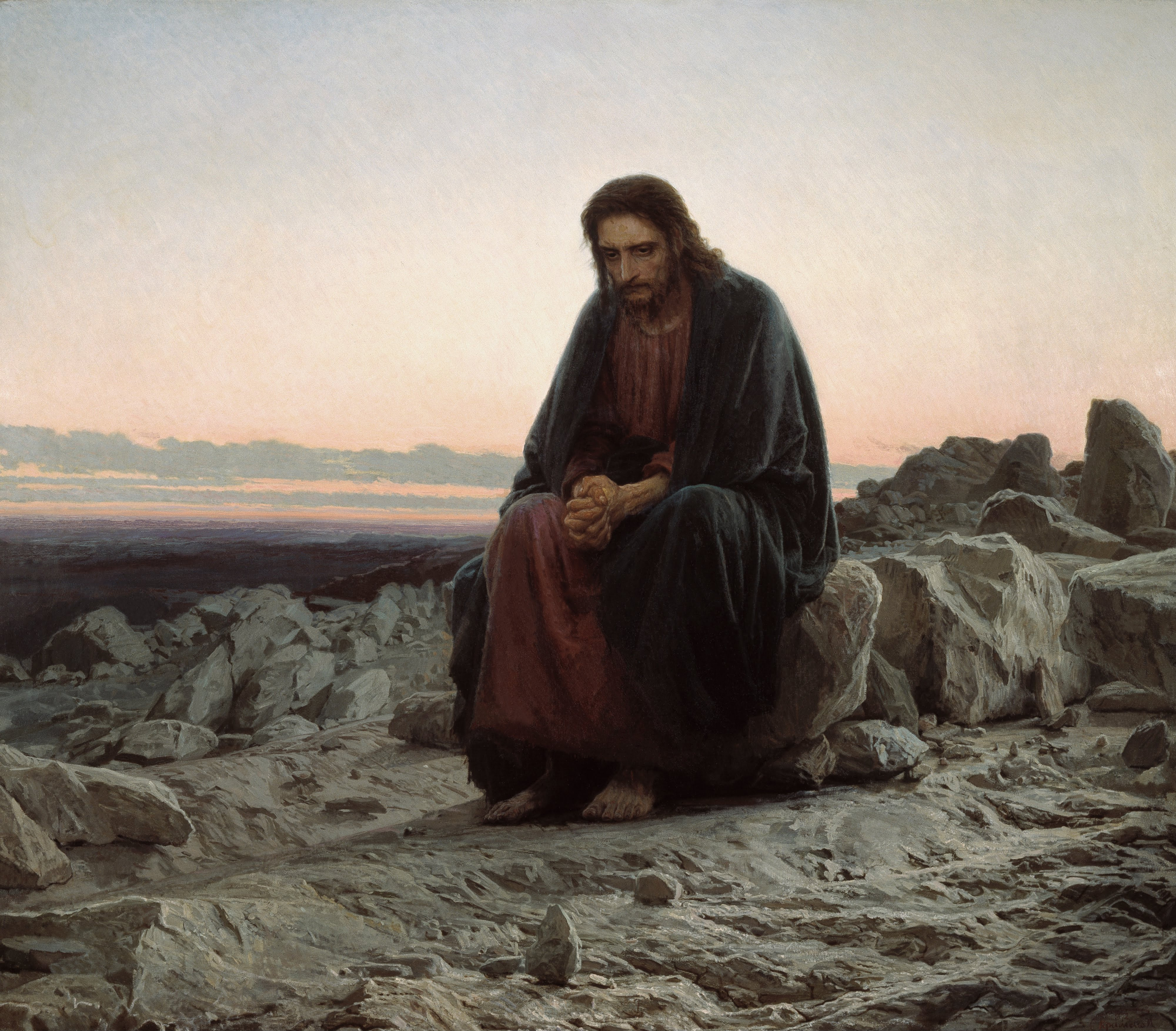
Diogenes of Sinope and Jesus of Nazareth, whose lives and teachings founded Cynicism and Christianity.

Though he did not regard himself as a Historical Jesus scholar, he suggested that Jesus was a wandering sage, similar in style to the Greco-Roman Cynics, and that the earliest "Jesus Movements" followed a similar model. He was a noted scholar of the hypothetical Q Document, and is confident that it can be sifted into three layers: one containing primarily wisdom sayings, another giving details on how the community ought to behave, and another containing apocalyptic pronouncements.

=== The Lost Gospel ===
The Lost Gospel develops the hypothesis of the "Q" source for the common material of Luke and Matthew not found in Mark. Mack develops the thesis that this was the earliest writing about Jesus, developed over decades by a community which he describes with unwavering confidence. Following John S. Kloppenborg, he believes that there are three major layers to it, each of which coincides with a stage in this community's life. The layers are significantly structured - the earliest material is spaced out and bracketed by later material, the later material showing awareness of the earlier sayings, but not vice versa.

- The earliest layer, called Q1, is composed of sayings attributed to Jesus and addressing the audience directly. These are mostly instructions on how to behave. The main teachings are to live in poverty, to lend without expecting anything in return, to love your enemies, not to judge, and not to worry, since God will provide what you need. Mack posits that Q1 itself can be broken into two historical stages, the first being simple maxims containing the core of the teachings, and the later stage being developments by the community giving illustrations and arguments for these maxims. Mack suggests that at this time Jesus was seen simply as a teacher by the community which produced the text, with many similarities to a sage in the Cynic tradition.
- The next major development, Q2, comprises the major portion of the Q document as reconstructed by Mack. In this layer the figure of John is introduced (he is not called a baptist in the Q document), as is the eschatological theme of judgement at the end of time, and also opposition to outsiders: the Pharisees and scribes are criticised. Mack sees in this layer an increased anxiety on the part of the community, a need to define itself against others, and also intimation that the community itself was causing tension: there is reference to father turning against son, brother turning against brother etc.
- The final layer, Q3, is very scant and thought by Mack to have been written after the Roman-Jewish war from 66-73AD. Passages added at this time include the temptations of Jesus and a lament for Jerusalem. The remainder consists of stern warnings and threats to keep the law, the first reference to Gehenna (hell fire) occurs at this stage. The severity of the language and the paucity of material compared with the earlier stages is thought to reflect the losses suffered by the community during the war.

== Reception ==
Mack's hypothesis presenting Jesus and the earliest Christians within the frame of Greco-Roman Cynicism is controversial. While most scholars have recognised finding Jesus within the context of 1st century Judaism, Mack and other proponents go against the majority and argue that Jesus be understood in a Hellenistic context. Evangelical-scholar Craig A. Evans dismisses this theory in The Misplaced Jesus: Interpreting Jesus in a Judaic Context, saying: "The Cynic hypothesis will in time assuredly be consigned to the dustbin of ill-conceived hypotheses, but it will be useful nonetheless to appeal to it as our point of departure." Other scholars, such as John Dominic Crossan, affirms the confluence of Hellenistic and Judaic cultures in 1st-century Galilee as a potential source for the similarities between Christ and the Cynic philosophers-peasants of antiquity. Crossan and Marcus Borg also agree with Mack's view that the original teachings of Jesus of Nazareth were non-eschatological.

Mack follows the lead of Kloppenborg in reconstructing Q in layers, focusing on Q communities. This sort of reconstruction has been criticised by a number of scholars such as Maurice Casey. On Jesus as a Cynic, Casey states that "When all the evidence is taken into account, supposed parallels of this kind show that Jesus was quite different from a Cynic philosopher, not that he was like one." Leif E. Vaage of Emmanuel College notes the similarities between the Q document and the texts of the Cynics, namely the Cynic epistles, which contains the wisdom and ethical anecdotes used by Cynic preachers and illustrates their ascetic way of life focused on purity.

== Selected works ==
=== Books ===
- Mack, Burton L. (1986). Wisdom and the Hebrew Epic: Ben Sira's Hymn in Praise of the Fathers. Chicago Studies in the History of Judaism. Chicago, IL: University of Chicago Press. ISBN 9780226500492. OCLC 12103912.
- ——— (1988). A Myth of Innocence: Mark and Christian Origins. Philadelphia, PA: Fortress Press. ISBN 9780800621131. OCLC 16683374.
- ——— (1989). Patterns of Persuasion in the Gospels. Foundations & facets - Literary facets. Sonoma, CA: Polebridge Press. ISBN 978-0-944344-08-8.
- ——— (1990). Rhetoric and the New Testament. Guides to Biblical Scholarship - New Testament series. Minneapolis, MN: Fortress Press. ISBN 9780800623951. OCLC 19970940.
- ——— (1993). Lost Gospel: The Book of Q & Christian Origins (1st ed.). San Francisco, CA: HarperSanFrancisco. ISBN 978-0-06-065374-3. OCLC 26262429.
- ——— (1996). Who Wrote the New Testament?: The Making of the Christian Myth. San Francisco, CA: HarperSanFrancisco. ISBN 0-06-065518-6. OCLC 32396578. - The gospels as narratives created by various communities.
- ——— (2001). The Christian Myth: Origins, Logic, and Legacy. New York, NY: Continuum. ISBN 978-0-8264-1355-0.
- ——— (2017). The Rise and Fall of the Christian Myth: Restoring our Democratic Ideals. New Haven & London: Yale University Press. ISBN 9780300222890. OCLC 953985622.

=== Edited by ===
- ———; Greenspahn, Frederick E.; Hilgert, Earle, eds. (1984). Nourished with Peace: studies in Hellenistic Judaism in memory of Samuel Sandmel. Homage series. Chico, CA: Scholars Press. ISBN 9780891307402. OCLC 10507442.

== Festschriften ==
- Castelli, Elizabeth A.; Taussig, Hal, eds. (1996). Reimagining Christian Origins: a colloquium honoring Burton L. Mack. Valley Forge, PA: Trinity Press International. ISBN 9781563381713. OCLC 34356104.
