= Biblical law in Seventh-day Adventism =

Interpretations of the law in the Bible within the Seventh-day Adventist Church form a part of the broader debate regarding biblical law in Christianity. Adventists believe in a greater continuation of laws such as the law given to Moses in the present day than do most other Christians. In particular, they believe the 10 Commandments still apply to today, including the Sabbath in particular.

== Official belief ==
One of the official 28 fundamental beliefs of the Adventist church states:

19. Law of God:
The great principles of God’s law are embodied in the Ten Commandments and exemplified in the life of Christ. They express God’s love, will, and purposes concerning human conduct and relationships and are binding upon all people in every age. These precepts are the basis of God’s covenant with His people and the standard in God’s judgment. Through the agency of the Holy Spirit they point out sin and awaken a sense of need for a Saviour. Salvation is all of grace and not of works, and its fruit is obedience to the Commandments. This obedience develops Christian character and results in a sense of well-being. It is evidence of our love for the Lord and our concern for our fellow human beings. The obedience of faith demonstrates the power of Christ to transform lives, and therefore strengthens Christian witness. (Ex. 20:1-17; Deut. 28:1-14; Ps. 19:7-14; 40:7, 8; Matt. 5:17-20; 22:36-40; John 14:15; 15:7-10; Rom. 8:3, 4; Eph. 2:8-10; Heb. 8:8-10; 1 John 2:3; 5:3; Rev. 12:17; 14:12.)

== History ==
Adventists have traditionally taught that the Decalogue is part of the moral law of God which was not abrogated by the ministry and death of Jesus Christ. Therefore, the fourth commandment concerning the Sabbath is as applicable to Christian believers as the other nine. Adventists have often taught a distinction between "moral law" and "ceremonial law". The moral law continues into the New Testament era, but the ceremonial law was done away with by Jesus.

How the Mosaic law should be applied came up at the 1888 Minneapolis General Conference Session. A. T. Jones and E. J. Waggoner looked at the problem addressed by Paul in Galatians as not the ceremonial law, but rather the wrong use of the law (legalism). They were opposed by Uriah Smith and George Butler at the 1888 Conference. Smith in particular thought the Galatians issue had been settled by Ellen White already, yet in 1890 she claimed justification by faith is "the third angel’s message in verity."

Some state that Ellen White interpreted Colossians 2:14 as saying that the ceremonial law was nailed to the cross. However, Ellen's White's statements clearly indicate that the only aspects of the law that were nailed to the cross were those things that specifically pointed forward to his sacrifice (e.g., animal sacrifices). These typical rituals were done away with when type met anti-type in the death of Christ. The other elements of the law of Moses that did not point specifically to Christ were not nailed to the cross. Scholars today typically understand the Greek word cheirographon which was nailed to the cross to be the record of sin.

At the 1952 Bible Conference, Edward Heppenstall’s presentations on the Two Covenants became the normative interpretation on the topic in the denomination to the present day. Heppenstall emphasized the importance of the heart in obeying the Ten Commandments (a position earlier stated by Ellen G. White, but did not become normative until this point). Early Adventists had emphasized legalism (i.e. “obey and live”) and during the early twentieth-century had wandered into a dispensationalist view of the covenants (Old Covenant belonged to the Old Testament). Heppenstall taught that the old and New Covenants are part of an everlasting covenant.

The 1957 publication Questions on Doctrine was a pivotal publication in Adventist history. One follow-up article was "The Law in Adventist Theology and Christian Experience"DjVu by Edward Heppenstall.

In 1981 disfellowshipped Australian Adventist Robert Brinsmead published Sabbatarianism Re-examined in which he criticised the Sabbath, arguing the Ten Commandments are not all inclusive.

Norm Young wrote in 1989 that "current Adventist exegesis conceives of the law as a total religious system and doesn't agree with the sharp distinction between moral and ceremonial law." Young has published numerous articles on biblical law in reputable Christian theology journals.

Adventists in accordance with the food laws of Leviticus 11, are encouraged to not eat "unclean" meat, including pork and shellfish, because the biblical distinction between clean and unclean animals existed prior to the Sinai covenant (see Gen. 6-9). Adventists oppose homosexuality, which they see as included in the commandment "You shall not commit adultery", not just as a part of the civil laws of the Old Testament.

== See also ==
- Seventh-day Adventist theology
- The Pillars of Adventism
- Biblical law in Christianity
- Sabbath in Seventh-day Adventism
