= Edward Heppenstall =

British Seventh-day Adventist theologian

Edward E. Heppenstall
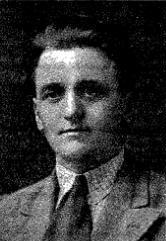
- Twenty-eight-year-old Heppenstall, 1929, Stanborough College Preceptor and English teacher. MW 3 May 1929, p. 5

Personal details
- Born: 1901 Rotherham, England
- Died: 1994 (aged 92–93) Redlands, California
- Children: Astrid Heppenstall Heger MD, Malcolm E Heppenstall MD
- Occupation: Theologian
- Education: University of Michigan

Edward E. Heppenstall (8 May 1901 in England – 1994) was a leading Bible scholar and theologian of the Seventh-day Adventist Church. A 1985 questionnaire of North American Adventist lecturers revealed Heppenstall was the Adventist writer who had most influenced them.

== Biography ==
Heppenstall was born in 1901 at Rotherham, Yorkshire, England to Arthur and Georgina Heppenstall. He had one sister, Margaret. Early in their lives, about 1915, their father died. Arthur and Georgina had been married only ten years. In 1915, Georgina and her two children joined the Adventist church. The Rotherham Adventist church met at the Heppenstall home. During middle to late 1920s, Ted Heppenstall worked as a student colporteur in various locations in the British Isles. In 1929, he served on the staff of Stanborough College as Preceptor (Men's Dean) and English teacher. The British Adventist media referred to him as E. A. Heppenstall. He moved to the United States in 1931. He earned a BA degree at Emmanuel Missionary College, majoring in English literature and also doing work in science and theology. Then he got a master's degree from the University of Michigan in History and Semitics. While teaching at La Sierra College he earned a PhD degree in the field of Religious Education from the University of Southern California in 1951. He pastored several churches, and also served as youth director for the Michigan Conference.

He served as a professor of theology at La Sierra College, now La Sierra University, from 1940 to 1955. He taught and was also the chairman of the systematic theology department at the Seventh-day Adventist Theological Seminary at Andrews University (1955–1966). He was also professor of theology at Loma Linda University (1966–1970). The commentary on the Second Epistle to the Corinthians for the Seventh-day Adventist Bible Commentary was written by him.

He had two children, both doctors – Malcolm Heppenstall, MD; and Astrid Heppenstall Heger, MD.

== Theology ==
His presentations on the law and covenants at the 1952 Bible Conference were highly influential upon the theology of the church. Heppenstall was responsible for a fuller understanding of the church's "investigative judgment" teaching.

Heppenstall was one of the most influential scholars to come out against M. L. Andreasen's final generation theology. While upholding the "pillar" doctrines of the Adventist pioneers, he moved forward on the understanding on such issues as the human nature of Christ and the atonement. He emphasized, as did Questions on Doctrine, the atonement on the cross with a continuing ministry in heaven in the antitypical Day of Atonement. Beyond these issues, he stressed such teachings as the helplessness of human beings to do good of their own selves, justification by faith in relation to the entire plan of salvation, the impossibility of humanly achieving what some people think of as sinless perfection, the fact that Jesus was not just like other children of fallen Adam and the new covenant experience.

Heppenstall's theology was seen by some as more cross-centered, Christ-centered, evangelical form of theology which in some ways differed from the then popular SDA understanding of salvation. This plainly shows up in Heppenstall's ideas on character perfection, the teaching that through the efforts of Christ people must overcome sin, he argued that nowhere does the Bible equate perfection with sinlessness when speaking of the child of God. He also said that salvation by grace means being shaken loose from what he considered to be the folly of implanting our ego at the center of the plan of salvation with the belief that we must arrive at sinless perfection to be sure of salvation. Focusing on the fact that sin is deeper than actions, that it is a part of human nature, Heppenstall said that sin does not reign in the true Christian's life, but it does remain in the sense that human nature, with its inherent limitations, cannot even faultlessly discern the complete will of God. He argued from the Bible that it is essentially spiritual maturity and walking with God in love. "Thus perfection, he pointed out while citing Ellen White's thoughts on the topic, is relative." SDA Historian George Knight argues that Ellen's view was not the same one held by Andreasen. He notes how White describes that Jesus, as a child, unlike other children, had an inclination to right rather than having sinful tendencies. Andreasen ideas on this issue, agreed with that of Jones, Waggoner, and Prescott, but not with Ellen White's understanding of the exact content and disposition of the "sinful" nature of Christ. White's understanding on the subject however is still very much under dispute. With his conclusions, Heppenstall returned to a basic Wesleyan concept of perfection as love in dynamic growth.

While Heppenstall's writings were influential, his teaching career was much more so. He influenced a generation of preachers and religion teachers through his college and seminary lectures. Themes highlighted by Heppenstall would echo in other classrooms through such teachers as Hans LaRondelle and Raoul Dederen, and in the pulpit through Morris Venden, throughout the 1970s and 1980s.

One Heppenstall protégé would eventually attain special visibility in the church. Heppenstall recognized the talents of Desmond Ford in the mid-1950s. In the early 1960s they both fought against what they believed to be the excesses and distortions of the Andreasen/Robert Brinsmead (in his early stage) perfectionist theology. But Ford would eventually move beyond Heppenstall in some theological areas that his mentor could not agree with. Heppenstall was disappointed when he failed to dissuade Ford from his position at Glacier View, subsequently writing to him that he "was shocked at how far" he "had swung to the left Biblically and doctrinally". Desmond Ford was later dismissed from the ministry of the Seventh-day Adventist church for his theological views.

Earlier Adventism tended to view the judgment in stern tones, with God keeping out those who hadn't been faithful. More recent times have witnessed an emphasis on the belief that God is for people, that He is on their side and wants them to be in the kingdom. Heppenstall said God's judgment will be in favor of believers. God's people have nothing to fear from the judgment with Christ as their advocate. The saint of the last days can also find confidence and security in facing the judgment when their names are confessed before the Father and the angelic host.

== Publications ==
- 1972 "Our High Priest: Jesus Christ in the Heavenly Sanctuary".
- 1974 "Salvation Unlimited: Perspectives in Righteousness by Faith".
- 1975 "In Touch With God". (A daily devotional)
- 1977 "The Man Who Is God: a Study of the Person and Nature of Jesus, Son of God and Son of Man".

== See also ==
- Seventh-day Adventist Church
- Seventh-day Adventist theology
- Seventh-day Adventist eschatology
- History of the Seventh-day Adventist Church
- 28 Fundamental Beliefs
- Questions on Doctrine
- Biblical Research Institute
- Teachings of Ellen G. White
- Inspiration of Ellen G. White
- Prophecy in the Seventh-day Adventist Church
- Investigative judgment
- Pillars of Adventism
- Second Coming
- Conditional Immortality
- Historicism
- Three Angels' Messages
- Sabbath in Seventh-day Adventism
- Ellen G. White
- Adventist Review
- Adventist
- Seventh-day Adventist Church Pioneers
- Seventh-day Adventist worship
- Adventism
