= SDARM Units =

This is a list of units of the Seventh Day Adventist Reform Movement, sorted by region.

== African Region ==
- Angolan Union
  - Central Angolan Field
  - North Angolan Field
  - South Angolan Field
- Bandundu Mission
- Botswana Mission
- Burundi Mission
- Cameroon Mission
- Central Nigerian Mission
- East-Central African Mission
- East Congo Mission
- East Nigerian Mission
- Equator Mission
- Ghana Mission
- Kasai Occidental Mission
- Kasai-Oriental Mission
- Malawi Mission
- Mozambique Mission
- North Congo Mission
- North Kivu Mission
- Resda Mission Field
- Rwandan Field
- Seychelles Mission Field
- South African Field
- South Kivu Mission
- Tanzanian Mission
- Ugandan Mission
- West Congo Mission
- Zambian Mission
- Zimbabwean Mission

== Asian Region ==
- Burmese Field
- Indonesian Field
- Nepali Mission
- North Indian Union
- Pakistani Mission
- Philippine Union
- South Indian Union Mission
- Sri Lankan Mission

== Central American Region ==
- Central American Union
- Dominican Field
- Haitian Field
- Martinique Field
- Mexican Union
- Puerto Rican Mission
- St. Lucian Mission Field

== Eurasian Region ==
- Czechoslovak Mission Field
- East European Union
- Israeli Mission Field
- Moldavian Union
- Polish Field

== European Region ==
- Austrian Field
- British Mission
- Bulgarian Field
- Finnish Mission Field
- French Field
- German Union
- Hungarian Field
- Italian Field
- Portuguese Field
- Romanian Union
- South Slavonic Union
- Spanish Field

== North American Region ==
- East Canadian Field
- East-Central United States Field
- Eastern United States Field
- Southeast United States Field
- West Canadian Mission Field
- Western United States Union
  - Central United States Field
  - Desert Mission
  - Nevada Mission
  - Northern California Conference
  - Pacific Northwest Mission
  - Southern California Conference

== Pacific Region ==
- Australasian Union
- French Polynesian Field
- Korean Field
- Mongolian Mission
- New Caledonia Mission Field
- Nippon Mission Field
- North Chinese Union
- South Chinese Union
- South Pacific Union Mission
- Vietnamese Mission

== South American Region ==
- Bolivian Union
- Chilean Union
- Colombian Field
- Ecuadorian Field
- Guyanese Mission
- North Brazilian Union
- Peruvian Union
- South American Southern Union
- South Brazilian Union
- Venezuelan Field

== See also ==
- Seventh Day Adventist Reform Movement
- SDARM General Conference
