= Earle Hilgert =

American academic theologian

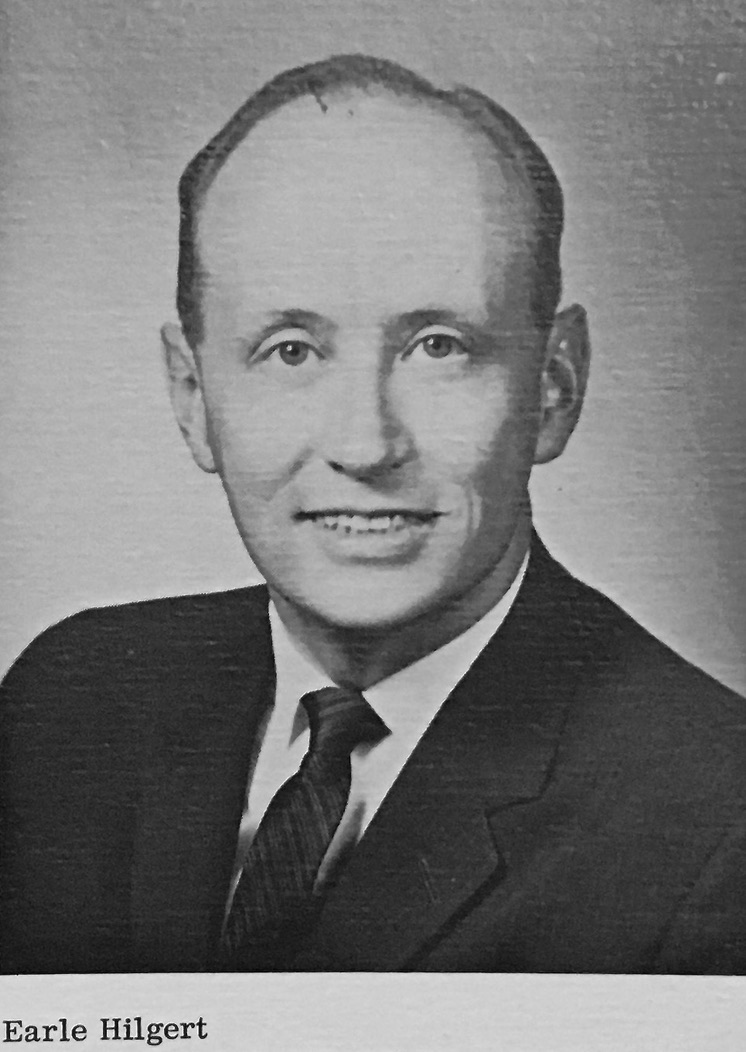
- Born: William Earle Hilgert; May 17, 1923; Portland, Oregon, US
- Died: December 22, 2020 (aged 97); Charlottesville, Virginia, US

Academic background
- Education: La Sierra College; Walla Walla College; SDA Theological Seminary; University of Basel; University of Chicago

Academic work
- Discipline: New Testament; Hellenistic Judaism
- Institutions: Andrews University; McCormick Theological Seminary

William Earle "Earle" Hilgert (May 17, 1923 – December 22, 2020) was an American academic theologian, administrator, and librarian. After filling various roles there for twenty years, Hilgert retired from McCormick Theological Seminary in 1990 as professor emeritus of New Testament.

== Life ==
Hilgert was the first of two children born to William T. Hilgert and Katie Ann Earle of Portland, Oregon. His sister was Willa Hedrick. In 1946, he married Elvire Roth. Both his sister and his wife predeceased him. Earle and Elvire had no children.

Hilgert, who had been ordained as a pastor in the Presbyterian Church (USA) in 1972, died in a church-sponsored retirement community, Westminster-Canterbury-Blue Ridge, in Charlottesville, Virginia. He is survived by a nephew, two nieces, and a brother-in-law.

== Education ==
After transferring from La Sierra College, Hilgert received a Bachelor of Arts degree in history and a Bachelor of Theology in ancient languages from Walla Walla College in 1945. He earned a Master of Arts degree in church history in 1946 and a Bachelor of Divinity degree in 1955 from the Seventh-day Adventist Theological Seminary. In 1962, he received a Doctor of Theology degree from the University of Basel in theology under the direction of Karl Barth, with secondary emphases in New Testament studies and church history. He obtained a Master of Arts degree in library science from the University of Chicago in 1970.

== Career ==
=== Academic appointments ===
Hilgert began his academic career at Philippine Union College, where he taught courses in history and biblical studies (1947–1951), as well as conducted the college band! In 1952, he joined the faculty of the Seventh-day Adventist Theological Seminary (Takoma Park, Maryland)—an appointment that continued until 1970, by which time the seminary had become part of Andrews University (Berrien Springs, Michigan). While at Andrews University, in addition to his position as professor of New Testament, he periodically filled various administrative roles, including chair of the Department of New Testament studies, acting Seminary dean (summers of 1961 and 1963 and the academic year 1965–1966) and vice-president for Academic Administration (1966–1969). In 1962, he was one of the founding editors of and regular contributor to the scholarly journal, Andrews University Seminary Studies.

Hilgert, born into a Seventh-day Adventist family (his father was an Adventist pastor), educated mostly in Adventist schools, ordained to the Adventist ministry, and published widely in Adventist periodicals and reference works, not only resigned from Andrews University in 1970 but, with his wife, also left the Adventist Church.

At this point, Earle joined Elvire at McCormick Theological Seminary in Chicago as a librarian—she having begun work there five years earlier as the head cataloging librarian. During his two-decade period at McCormick, Hilgert served in various roles including; reference librarian, lecturer in New Testament Greek; professor of bibliography; professor of bibliography and New Testament; acting seminary dean (1972–1973); and interim dean of doctoral studies. He also led or participated in many professional developments including; creating the Philo Institute with faculty colleagues, especially Robert Hamerton-Kelly (1971); editing and publishing the journal, Studia Philonica (1972–1979); and influencing the Society of Biblical Literature to create a program unit for Philo of Alexandria (1984).

As a fitting celebration of Hilgert's distinguished academic career, the 1991 issue of the Studia Philonica Annual was a festschrift in his honor, Heirs of the Septuagint: Philo, Hellenistic Judaism and early Christianity: Festschrift for Earle Hilgert.

=== Other activities ===
While at Andrews University, Hilgert, as a member of the Faith and Order Commission of the World Council of Churches, attended the commission's triennial meeting in Bristol, England (July 30–August 8, 1967) and reported on it in the context of its history.

In retirement, Hilgert contributed to his community through regular preaching appointments. Until the time of his death, he was also a volunteer teacher in the Osher Lifelong Learning Institute at the University of Virginia.

== Publications ==
Hilgert wrote many periodical and journal articles and book chapters, as well as serving on the editorial team and writing materials for the Seventh-day Adventist Bible Commentary. The following are among his authored and edited books:

- Hilgert, Earle. (2020). The Ship and Related Symbols in the New Testament. Eugene, Oregon: Wipf and Stock.. ISBN 978-1725280441 (reprint of his 1962 ThD Basel dissertation published by Assen, Netherlands: Royal Van Gorcum)
- De Klerk, Peter and Hilgert, Earle, eds. (1980). Essays on Theological Librarianship Presented to Calvin Henry Schmitt. Philadelphia: The American Theological Association.
- Greenspahn, Fredrick, Hilgert, Earle, and Mack, Button L., eds. (1984) Nourished with Peace: Studies in Hellenistic Judaism in Memory of Samuel Sandmel. Chico, California: Scholars Press. ISBN 9780891307402
- Dudley, Carl S. and Hilgert, Earle (1987). New Testament Tensions and the Contemporary Church. Philadelphia: Fortress Press. ISBN 9780800619558
