= Heppenstall =

Heppenstall is a surname. Notable people with the surname include:

- Davis Heppenstall (born 1993), American drag queen known as Naomi Smalls
- Edward Heppenstall (1901–1994), Bible scholar and theologian of the Seventh-day Adventist Church
- Rayner Heppenstall (1911–1981), British novelist, poet, diarist, and radio producer
