= General conference =

General Conference can refer to:

== United Nations ==
- General Conference (United Nations), the recurring meetings of Member States for the specialized agencies of the United Nations such as the International Atomic Energy Agency and UNESCO.

== Christianity ==
- General conference (Latter Day Saints), a meeting open to all members of a particular Latter Day Saint denomination.
  - General Conference (LDS Church), a biannual world conference of The Church of Jesus Christ of Latter-day Saints held in April and October.
- General Conference Mennonite Church, an association of Mennonite congregations based in North America from 1860 to 2002
- General Conference (Methodism), the top legislative body in many Methodist denominations
- General Conference of Seventh-day Adventists, the world governing body of the Seventh-day Adventist Church
  - 1888 Minneapolis General Conference (Adventist), a particularly important meeting of the General Conference of Seventh-day Adventists in 1888
- Mennonite Church Canada

== See also ==
- Baptist General Conference
- Friends General Conference
- SDARM General Conference, the governing authority for the Seventh Day Adventist Reform Movement denomination
- General Conference on Weights and Measures, the international measurement body
