= 1952 Bible Conference (Adventist) =

Seventh-day Adventist conference in Takoma Park, Maryland, US

The 1952 Bible Conference was a Seventh-day Adventist conference in the Sligo Church in Takoma Park, Maryland from September 1–13, 1952. There were 498 people listed as attending this meeting with worldwide representation (with at least 3 people from every division of the General Conference). From published reports it appears that there were on average 450 people in attendance during the presentations. The Conference was the second major Bible Conference held by Adventists during the twentieth century, and the next major meeting of its kind after the 1919 Bible Conference. According to the then General Conference president, W. H. Branson, these meetings were regarded as "one of the most important meetings in our history."

== Reasons for the Conference ==
In 1943, Seventh-day Adventist college bible teachers formed the Bible Research Fellowship. According to Raymond Cottrell, secretary for the fellowship, a misunderstanding of the group's relationship to the church led to its discontinuation and to the "official" 1952 Bible Conference.

In the July 1952 issue of Ministry magazine, W. H. Branson, President of the General Conference, listed three reasons for the bible conference:

1. Since the last conference (1919) a new generation of administrators and bible teachers had come on the scene. The conference was to increase the preaching efficiency of the minister by giving a "new lift to our hearts and minds and spirits."
2. The political, social, economic and religious world had changed over the past decades. "The question that should ever concern us is not whether we have a great and true message but whether we are presenting that message in its true greatness." He spoke against theological conferences where every man sets forth that which is right in his own eyes, and where the distinguishing symbol of the meeting is a question mark. "We have great verities to preach." He said. "The purpose of this Bible conference is to help us all to see how we can present those timeless truths most effectively in these changing times."
3. As the church uses a searchlight to intensely explore and promote the truths it already has, it sees further areas of truth. "That is why we believe that the safe and Scriptural way to advance the message of this movement is by giving first and major attention at this conference to the great truths that have made us a people, and by keeping the searchlight of those truths ever focused forward toward the New Jerusalem. Those who address us will tell us what the searchlight reveals to them of greater depth and distance to the message we have been proclaiming for well over a century."

== Conference Structure ==
There were 82 presentations with a devotional lecture each day at noon; Sabbath (Saturday) programs were open to the public. The meeting commenced with a communion service on Friday afternoon and a "revival" church service on Sabbath led by the former General Conference (GC) president, J. L. McElhany. The sessions were chaired by the General Conference president, W. H. Branson, and fellow GC Vice-presidents.

== Planning Committee ==
A planning committee of 23 members asked participants to present. Potential speakers were asked to write up their presentations and submit them to the committee. They were then "preached" (as opposed to reading them). In only a "few" cases were individuals asked to leave things out of their prepared presentations, and most of the suggestions were given to help avoid repetition among presenters. The planning committee consisted of W. H. Branson, L. K. Dickson, E. D. Dick, H. L. Rudy, A. V. Olson, R. R. Figuhr, W. B. Ochs, R. A. Anderson, C. L. Torrey, D. E. Rebok, L. E. Froom, W. A. Spicer, Glenn Calkins, E. E. Cossentine, J. E. Weaver, M. V. Campbell, L. L. Moffitt, T. H. Jemison, W. E. Read, F. D. Nichol, M. L. Rice, F. H. Yost, and C. L. Bauer.

Seventh-day Adventist leaders set a goal to double church membership from 1950 to 1953. Therefore, revival was needed among church leaders to help further this evangelistic goal. It was furthermore believed that because a whole new generation of leaders had "come on the scene of action" that they would benefit by a series of revival meetings centered on Bible study. Furthermore, a re-examination of doctrinal positions would help "make sure that they are setting forth the truth in a way that most fully explains the meaning of the times."." In addition, events surrounding World War II caused Adventist prophetic expositors to re-examine some points of prophetic exposition.

== Highlights and Analysis ==
Siegfried H. Horn spoke several times at the conference. The year before, he had received a Ph.D. in Egyptology from the Oriental Institute of the University of Chicago. He studied briefly under William F. Albright. Two of Horn's presentations have been preserved as audio recordings. He provided a review of archaeological discoveries relevant to the biblical record and reported recent discoveries in both archaeology and palaeography, a few of which he gave eye-witness accounts. In the first of the two published volumes of the conference, fifty-five pages cover his report.

Another significant lecture was given by W. E. Read on the topic of Armageddon. His lecture represented a dramatic shift in Adventist eschatology. During and prior to World War II Adventists had interpreted Armageddon as a battle between the Oriental and Western nations. Read argued that the battle of Armageddon was instead a battle between the forces of good and evil. This position has since become an accepted stance in the denomination.

Several presentations focused on attacks by Bible critics. According to Francis D. Nichol, one of the leaders of the conference, Adventists needed to take "these very missiles that are so confidently hurled at them . . . [and] even more confidently hurled [them] back at the Bible critic." In this light, several presentations focused on recent archaeological discoveries as "evidence for Bible inspiration."." Study was also given to the relation of "science to Adventist faith."

Edward Heppenstall's presentations on the Two Covenants became the normative interpretation on the topic in the denomination to the present day. Heppenstall emphasized the importance of the heart in obeying the Ten Commandments a view taught by Ellen G. White. Early Adventists had tended to emphasize legalism (i.e. "obey and live") and during the early twentieth-century had felt the influence of the dispensationalist view of the covenants (that the old covenant belonged to the Old Testament). Heppenstall re-emphasized the church belief, that the old and new covenants are part of an everlasting covenant.

== Legacy ==
Shortly after the Bible Conference, the Biblical Research Committee was founded by the General Conference. This new organization was created to encourage biblical research and to provide guidance to those who have new biblical ideas. The committee was chaired by W. E. Read until 1956 and became the Biblical Research Institute in 1975.

The 1952 Bible Conference opened the way for new scholarly projects like the Seventh-day Adventist Bible Commentary (published 1953–1957) and Problems in Bible Translation (1954). Some contend that it also showcased new biblical and archaeological research that affirmed traditional Adventist beliefs.

== Research ==
The edited transcripts of the 1952 Conference were published as Our Firm Foundation. In addition, the recordings of the Bible Conference have recently been conserved and digitized at the Loma Linda University Archives & Special Collections. They are also available at Adventist Archives.

== See also ==
- History of the Seventh-day Adventist church
- 1888 Minneapolis General Conference
- 1919 Bible Conference
- Seventh-day Adventist Church
- Seventh-day Adventist theology
