= Vladimir Shelkov =

Ukrainian Seventh-day Adventist leader

Vladimir Andreevich Shelkov Владимир Андреевич Шелков (December 20, 1895 – January 27, 1980) was a Christian preacher and Seventh Day Adventist Reform Movement leader in the former Soviet Union. He was third leader of the All-Russian Union of Adventist Reformers and headed the Church of True and Free Seventh-day Adventists, which rejected any government interference in the activities.

Shelkov was born in Velyka Vyska village of Kherson Governorate, today in Ukraine.

In 1931 Shelkov was imprisoned for the first time by the Soviet regime and spent almost all his life in prisons and camps. In 1946 Shelkov had been sentenced to capital punishment, which later was changed to 10 years imprisonment. His last confinement began in 1979 when a Soviet court in Tashkent sentenced him (then a delicate eighty-three-year-old man) to five years of hard labor camps.

Shelkov died in a labor camp Tabaga near Yakutsk in 1980.
