= Francis D. Nichol =

Seventh-day Adventist apologist

- Born: February 14, 1897; Thirlmere, New South Wales, Australia
- Died: June 6, 1966 (aged 69)
- Occupations: Author, and Editor of the Adventist Review, and Supervising Editor of the Seventh-day Adventist Bible Commentary of the Seventh-day Adventist Church

Francis David Nichol (February 14, 1897 – June 6, 1966) was a Seventh-day Adventist editor, of the church's main newsmagazine, and supervising editor of the Seventh-day Adventist Bible Commentary, author, and also chairman of the Ellen G. White Estate board of trustees, and considered the leading twentieth-century apologist for the prophetic ministry of Ellen G. White. In 1965, Walter Martin described him as "the most able Adventist apologist."

== Biography ==
F. D. Nichol was born 14 February 1897 in Thirlmere, New South Wales, Australia to John and Mary Nichol who became Adventists after reading a discarded copy of the Review and Herald (now the Adventist Review). In 1905 when Francis was eight years old his family emigrated to Loma Linda, California, and in 1920 he graduated from Pacific Union College in the Napa Valley with a Bachelor of Theology degree. In 1921 he joined the editorial staff of Signs of the Times and in 1927 became associate editor of the Review and Herald. He became editor in 1945 upon the retirement of Francis M. Wilcox and held this post until his death in June 1966. Nichol was a prolific author and wrote several works including Answers to Objections (1932/1952) and The Midnight Cry (1944). He was also chairman of the Ellen G. White Estate board of trustees and the supervising editor of the Seventh-day Adventist Bible Commentary. He wrote two apologetic works supporting the prophetic ministry of Ellen G. White: Ellen G. White and Her Critics: An Answer to the Major Charges that Critics Have Brought Against Mrs. Ellen G. White (1951; available online), and Why I Believe in Mrs. E. G. White (1964).

The standard biography of Nichol is: Miriam G. Wood and Kenneth H. Wood, His Initials Were F.D.N.: A Life Story of Elder F. D. Nichol, for Twenty-one Years Editor of the Review and Herald (1967). A commemorative issue of the Review and Herald, dated 10 June 1966, that contains a life sketch of F. D. Nichol by Raymond F. Cottrell and other tributes can be read online.

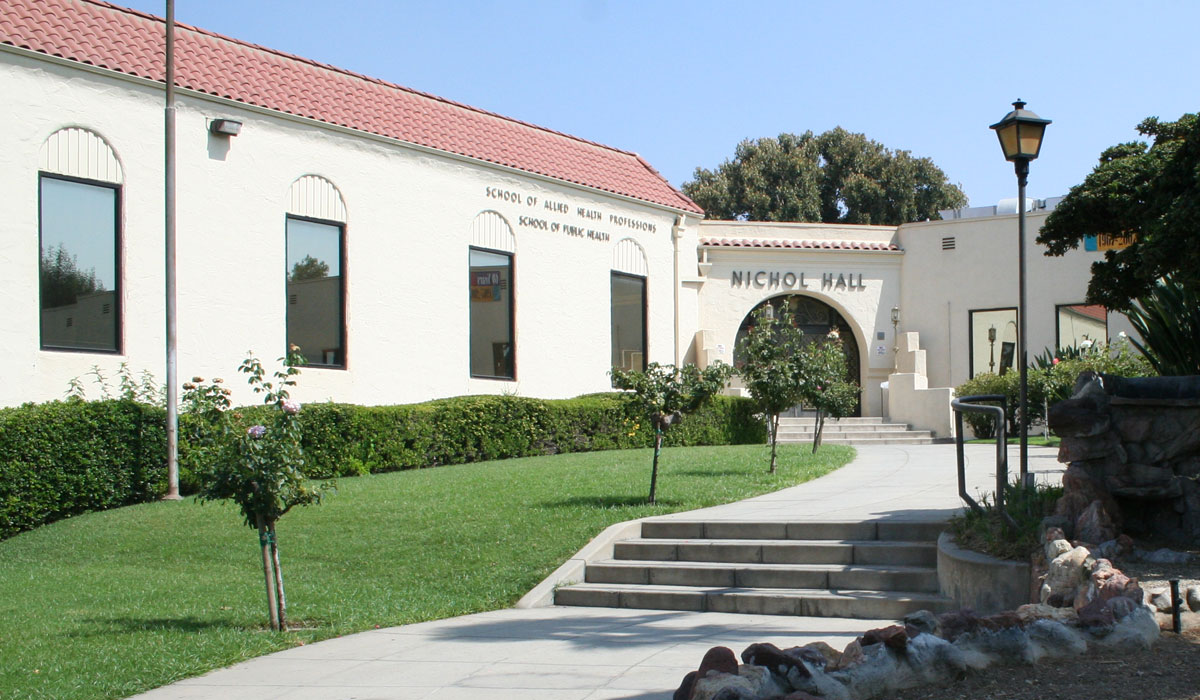
Nichol Hall at Loma Linda University

Loma Linda University in Loma Linda, California and Pacific Union College have both named buildings in his honor. Nichol Hall at Loma Linda University currently serves as classroom, office, and laboratory space for the Schools of Allied Health Professions and Public Health while Nichol Hall at Pacific Union College serves as a men's dormitory.

== See also ==
- Adventist Review
- 1952 Bible Conference
- Seventh-day Adventist Commentary Reference Series

Preceded by Francis M. Wilcox	Editor of the Adventist Review; 1945 – 1966	Succeeded by Kenneth H. Wood
Preceded by Albert Victor Olson	Chairperson of the Ellen G. White Estate; 1963 – 1966	Succeeded by William Paul Bradley
