= John Luis Shaw =

American Seventh-day Adventist leader

Chairperson of the Ellen G. White Estate
- In office 1936–1937
- Preceded by: John Edwin Fulton
- Succeeded by: Francis M. Wilcox

John Luis Shaw (1870–1952) was a Seventh-day Adventist missionary, educator, and treasurer. He was born September 5, 1870, in Central City, Gilpin, Colorado. He graduated from the scientific course at Battle Creek College (now Andrews University) in 1893 and became dean of men at Union College. In 1897 he became principal of Claremont Union College in South Africa. In 1901 he was ordained and sent to India, where he oversaw the establishment of the Watchman Press in 1903 and was in charge of the field from 1901 to 1912. He returned to the United States because of poor health in 1912 and was appointed principal of the Washington Foreign Mission Seminary. From 1913 to 1915 he was secretary of the General Conference Department of Education. From 1922 to 1936 he was treasurer of the General Conference. During his retirement he served for a time as board chair of Loma Linda University. He died July 22, 1952 at age 81.88, in Loma Linda, California.

== See also ==
- History of the Seventh-day Adventist Church
- Seventh-day Adventist Church
- Seventh-day Adventist theology
- Seventh-day Adventist eschatology
- Teachings of Ellen White
- Inspiration of Ellen White
- Prophecy in the Seventh-day Adventist Church
- Investigative judgment
- The Pillars of Adventism
- Second Advent
- Baptism by Immersion
- Conditional Immortality
- Historicism
- Three Angels' Messages
- End times
- Sabbath in Seventh-day Adventism
- Ellen G. White
- Adventist
- Seventh-day Adventist Church Pioneers
- Seventh-day Adventist worship

| Preceded by John Edwin Fulton | Chairperson of the Ellen G. White Estate; 1936–1937 | Succeeded by Francis M. Wilcox |
