= 1919 Bible Conference =

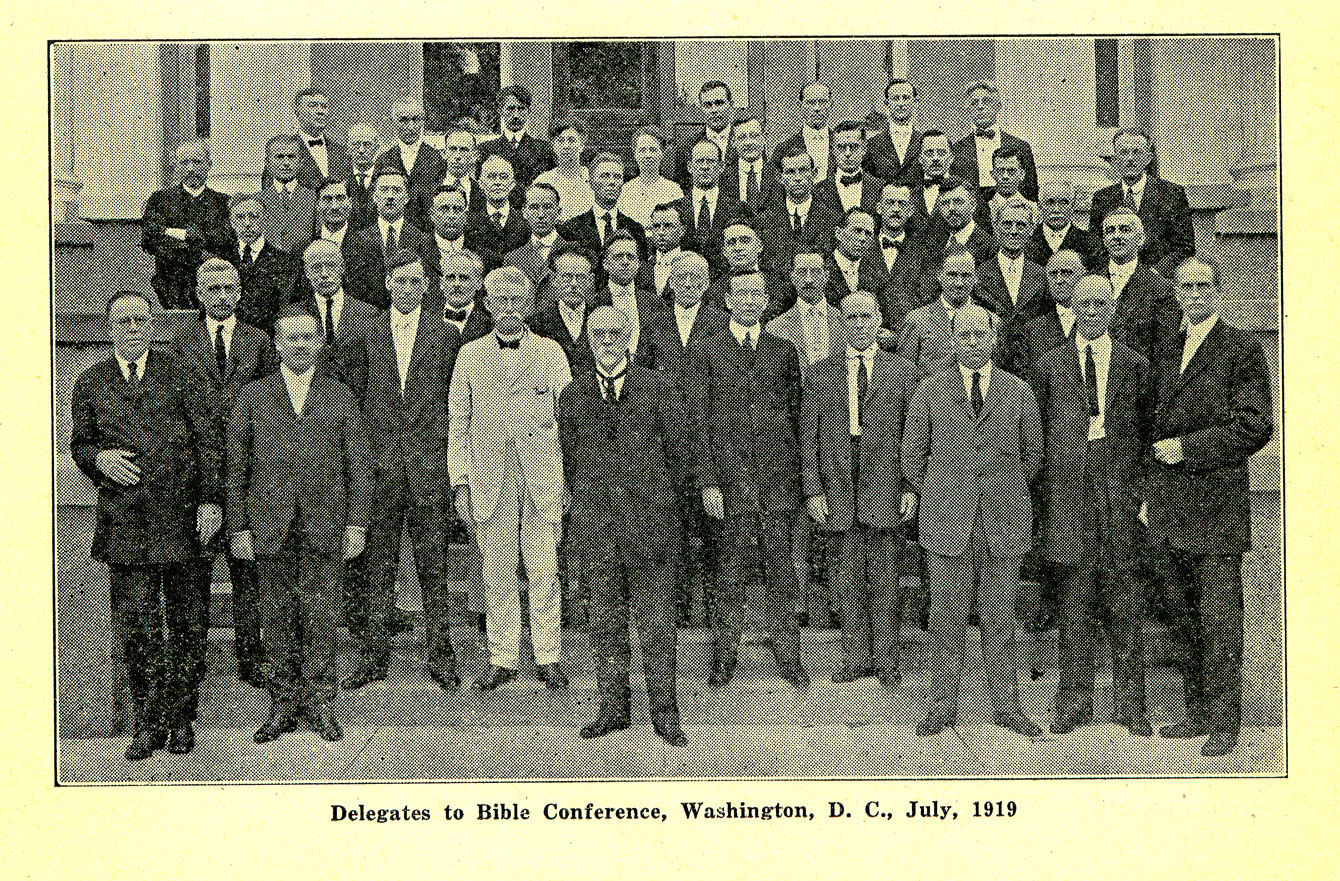

The 1919 Bible Conference was a Seventh-day Adventist Church conference or council held from July 1 to August 9, 1919, for denominational leaders, educators, and editors to discuss theological and pedagogical issues. The council was convened by the General Conference Executive Committee led by A. G. Daniells, the president of the General Conference. The meetings included the first major discussion of the inspiration of Ellen G. White's writings after her death in 1915, and the far-reaching theological scope of the discussions would generate considerable controversy.

== Historical setting ==
The first decades of the 20th century were traumatic for American Protestantism because for half a century the churches had gradually divided into conservative (fundamentalist) and liberal (modernist) wings. The liberal churches accepted Darwinian evolution and integrated it into their belief system as "God's way of doing things." They envisioned religion as evolving from the primitive to the complex, with Christianity being the most evolved religion. The Bible was viewed not as a supernatural production, but as a collection of myths and primitive understandings. At the very center of presuppositions behind modernism was the authority of reason and the findings of science. What was not reasonable or scientific was discarded, such as the virgin birth, resurrection and Second Advent of Jesus, miracles, and substitutionary atonement. Jesus was an example of what human being could become. They promoted the essential goodness of human nature, that sin is not rebellion but ignorance correctable by education and social reform, and that the kingdom of God was brought through the ceaseless process of evolution.

This "new theology" did not enthrall all Protestants. The conservative reaction to liberalism became known as fundamentalism. The fundamentalists emphasized the doctrines and issues denied by the modernists, centering on inerrancy and verbal inspiration of the Bible, The virgin birth, substitutionary atonement, the bodily resurrection and authenticity of miracles, the Second Advent and the importance of creation over evolution. The one point that determined all others was religious authority, the concept of the Bible as being completely trustworthy.

At this point in time, Adventism had no temptation toward liberalism. From their inception Adventists had held to all of the beliefs of the fundamentalists except the views on inspiration and the seventh-day Sabbath.

The Seventh-day Adventist 1919 Bible Conference occurred during the height of the Bible Conference Movement among Fundamentalist evangelicals in the United States. Despite their different beliefs, at the outset of the 1919 Bible Conference Adventist leaders would cite the example of these other conferences as an inspiration for their own meeting.

According to W. C. White, W. W. Prescott brought the idea of inerrancy and "verbal inspiration" of the Bible into Adventism during the late 1880s "The acceptance of that view," White wrote, "by the students in the Battle Creek College and many others, including Elder S. N. Haskell, has resulted in bringing into our work questions and perplexities without end, and always increasing." Knight says that verbalism was held by some Adventists from the beginning of the movement, but it became problematic by the late 1920s. By that time, many Adventists applied their beliefs in inerrancy and verbalism of the Bible also to the writings of Ellen White.

But Ellen White did not believe in verbal inspiration. She wrote in 1886, "The Bible is written by inspired men, but it is not God's mode of thought and expression. It is that of humanity. God, as a writer, is not represented. ... The writers of the Bible were God's penmen, not his pen. ... It is not the words of the Bible that are inspired, but the men that were inspired. Inspiration acts not on the man's words or his expressions but on the man himself, who, under the influence of the Holy Ghost, is imbued with thoughts. But the words receive the impress of the individual mind. The divine mind is diffused. The divine mind and will is combined with the human mind and will; thus the utterances of the man are the word of God." Not only did Ellen White reject verbal inspiration but she also denied inerrancy of the Bible. This position on thought versus verbal inspiration was the one officially adopted by the denomination three years earlier at the 1883 General Conference session.

Ellen not only rejected verbal inspiration but also denied inerrancy. Thus she was glad to have factual errors corrected in her book The Great Controversy during the 1911 revision. But this played havoc with verbalists in the Adventist camp. After all, how can one "correct" or "revise' a verbally inspired writing? W. C. White wrote "there is a danger of our injuring Mother's work by claiming for it more than she claimed for it." By 1919, General Conference president Daniells and Prescott viewed inspiration in the same light as the Whites and the 1883 GC resolution. Daniells said his view on verbal inspiration changed when he saw that Ellen White had rewritten some chapters in The Desire of Ages "over and over and over again." He said "it is no ... use for anybody" to talk about verbal inspiration of the Testimonies, "because everybody who has ever seen the work done knows better." It is no accident that those closest to Ellen White denied inerrancy and verbalism for the Bible and her writings.

== Introduction ==
All together there were 65 individuals in attendance accompanied by between seven and nine stenographers. The 1919 Bible Conference was academic, the first of its kind having a significant number of participants with advanced training in theology, history, and biblical languages. The meeting was by invitation only so that those present could "exercise care and good judgment" while discussing varying viewpoints.

== Debate concerning Ellen White ==
While not on the original agenda, other historical and theological issues would be incorporated into the conference—-most significantly, the inspiration and role of Ellen White and how Adventist viewed her. George B. Thompson, field secretary of the General Conference, noted: "If we had always taught the truth [regarding Ellen White] we would not have any trouble or shock in the denomination now". Thompson's statement represents a growing rift between participants over the nature and role of inspiration. Much of the debate revolved around problems in prophetic interpretation. Many of those present at this conference were personally acquainted with Ellen White and tried to correct the view that her writings were inerrant (that inspired writings contain no mistakes) as advocated by Fundamentalists (see Biblical inerrancy). A. G. Daniells, W. W. Prescott, and H. C. Lacey would publicly denounce the concept of inerrancy in relationship to Ellen White's writings, differentiating her writings from those of the Bible which they argued were inerrant.

The suggestion that Ellen White's writings might not be inerrant appears to have met with hostility, especially by Benjamin G. Wilkinson. Some of these younger leaders bucked against older church leaders. Much of the debate on inspiration revolved around historical revisions in the 1911 edition of Great Controversy. Whereas Daniells and Prescott had been intimately involved in these revisions, some of the younger delegates were not, and there was the far more important question of how the denomination should go about making revisions now that she was dead. D. E. Robinson, who had been Ellen White's secretary for 13 years, and who had also assisted on the 1911 revision, referred to some "slight inaccuracies in the historical work [Great Controversy]" and stated that Ellen White desired "to make everything accurate." He said:

"I know that Sister White appreciated the work of Brother Prescott and others in calling attention to some of these slight inaccuracies in the historical work; and when the plates were worn out and a new edition became necessary, she did instruct us as her workers to do everything we could to make everything accurate. I think that Brother [C. C.] Crisler and myself spent nearly six months in the study of Great Controversy. There were many points raised. I will say this, that not all the suggestions that were sent in by our brethren were followed. And as a personal testimony, I want to say that in all my experience with Sister White I had nothing that more distinctly confirmed my faith in the divine guidance than the work we did in the revision of Great Controversy. As Bible and history teachers, you know how hard it is to write history and how even the best historians err" (cf. Robert W. Olson, "Historical Discrepancies in the Spirit of Prophecy".

It is not clear what the consensus of the delegates was toward the inspiration of Ellen White. Some were concerned that church members would become "terribly upset if they should discover that Ellen White was fallible". No decision was officially made as to what to do, and eventually it was decided not to publish the conference transcripts. One delegate, John Isaac, remarked: "The study was a wonderful help to me. I always believed the testimonies, but quite often when I was asked questions I had to say I don't know, I don't understand, but . . . [now] I have received wonderful help from these meetings". Even Daniells remarked afterward, "I think I can truly say that at the close of this important meeting, we stand together more unitedly and firmly for all the Fundamentals than when we began the meeting". Yet the suspicions of J. S. Washburn and Claude Holmes, among others, were aroused, and they saw "this Bible Institute" as one of "the most terrible thing[s] that has ever happened in the history of this denomination". Together Holmes and Washburn would work to secure Daniells' dismissal at the 1922 General Conference Session, as well as remove other key participants of the 1919 Bible Conference.

The conference was then nearly forgotten until 1975 when the Conference transcripts were discovered in the General Conference Archives. Transcripts excerpts were first published in 1979 by Spectrum, and are now available in their entirety from an official church website (see below).

== See also ==
- 1888 Minneapolis General Conference
- 1952 Bible Conference
- History of the Seventh-day Adventist Church
- Inspiration of Ellen G. White
