= Denton E. Rebok =

American Seventh-day Adventist leader (1897–1983)

Denton Edward Rebok
- Born: Denton Edward Rebok; January 1, 1897; Pennsylvania
- Died: January 1, 1983 (aged 86); United States

Denton Edward Rebok (1897–1983) was a Seventh-day Adventist educator and administrator. Born in Pennsylvania, he served the denomination for 44 years. He spent 23 years as a missionary in China. While there he founded the China Training Institute, a junior college located in the town of Qiaotou in northern Jiangsu province, about 160 miles from Shanghai and 30 miles from Nanjing, in 1925. He taught at Washington Missionary College, La Sierra College, was president of Southern Missionary College also Dean of the Seventh-day Adventist Theological Seminary. He served briefly as chair of the Ellen G. White Estate board of trustees in 1952, and gave two presentations about Ellen G. White at the 1952 Bible Conference. He authored Believe His Prophets, an apologetic for the prophetic gift of Ellen White.

== Legacy ==
After his death, the Rebok estate provided a gift to the Seventh-day Adventist Church; 70% of which helped establish a library at the church's world headquarters and 30% to Adventist World Radio - Asia, for an endowment fund.

The General Conference of Seventh-day Adventists' Rebok Memorial Library holds approximately 9,700 books, primarily from the 20th century although there are some earlier books. The Library has most Seventh-day Adventist publications in English from the United States and abroad as well as some Spanish-language publications.

== Bibliography ==
Denton E. Rebok, "Divine Guidance in the Remnant of God's Church" (The Oriental Watchman Publishing House, 1955). Herbert Ford, "For the Love of China: The Life Story of Denton E. Rebok" (Pacific Press, 1971).

== See also ==
- Seventh-day Adventist Church
- Seventh-day Adventist theology
- Seventh-day Adventist eschatology
- History of the Seventh-day Adventist Church
- Teachings of Ellen White
- Inspiration of Ellen White
- Prophecy in the Seventh-day Adventist Church
- Investigative judgment
- The Pillars of Adventism
- Second Advent
- Baptism by Immersion
- Conditional Immortality
- Historicism
- Three Angels' Messages
- End times
- Sabbath in Seventh-day Adventism
- Ellen G. White
- Adventist
- Seventh-day Adventist Church Pioneers
- Seventh-day Adventist worship

Preceded by Milton E. Kern	Chairperson of the Ellen G. White Estate; 1952	Succeeded by Albert Victor Olson
Preceded by Milton E. Kern	Dean of the Seventh-day Adventist Theological Seminary; 1943 – 1951	Succeeded by Vernon Edwards Hendershot
