= George A. Irwin =

American Seventh-day Adventist minister (1844–1913)

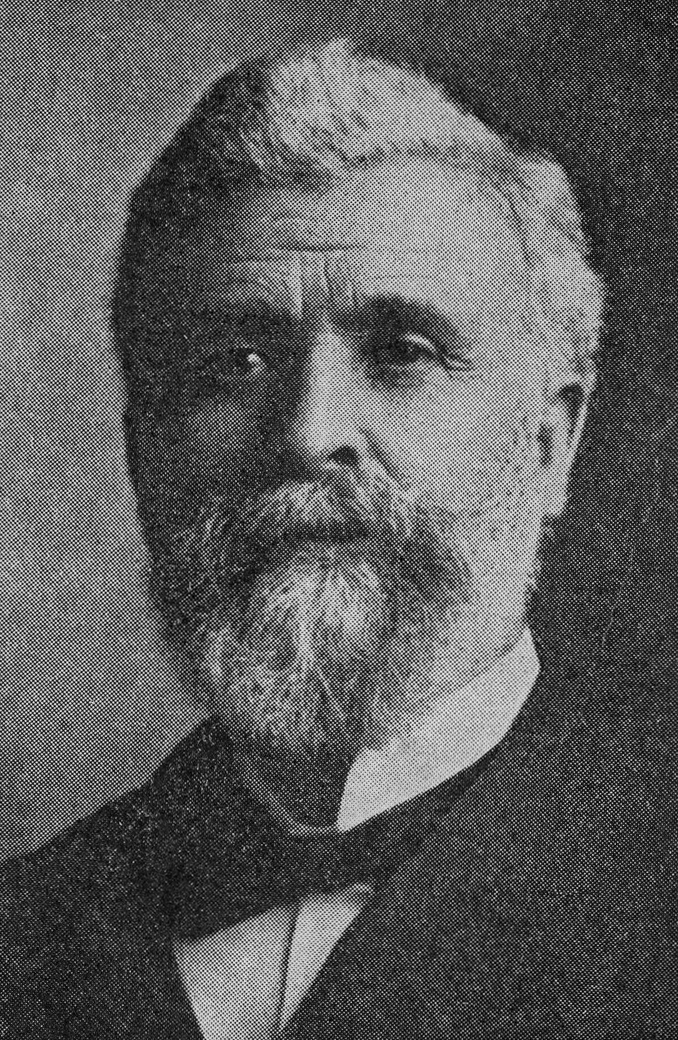
- George A. Irwin
- Born: November 17, 1844 c. Mt. Vernon, Ohio
- Died: May 23, 1913
- Known for: President of the General Conference of Seventh-day Adventists

George A. Irwin (November 17, 1844 – May 23, 1913) was an American Seventh-day Adventist administrator who served as President of the General Conference from 1897 to 1901.

== Biography ==
Irwin was born close to Mt. Vernon, Ohio on November 17, 1844. At age 17, he volunteered for the Union Army during the American Civil War, where he was placed with the 20th Regiment of the Ohio Volunteer Infantry. He was captured near Atlanta and spent time at Andersonville Prison.

In 1867, Irwin married a schoolteacher named Nettie Johnson. The George Irwin family were converted to the Seventh-Day Adventist faith in 1885 by a series of meetings held by D. E. Lindsay and W. H. Saxby. He became president of the Ohio Conference of Seventh-Day Adventists in 1889. In March 1897, he was elected President of the General Conference at the General Conference session held in Lincoln, Nebraska. As president, he sought to re-organize the duties of the ministry, and made a tour of Australia.

A. G. Daniells was elected General Conference President in 1901, and Irwin was asked to replace him as head of the Australian Union. He became disheartened about his time as General Conference president, viewing it as an "utter failure." He returned to the United States in 1905 and served as vice-president of the General Conference. He was installed as president of the Pacific Union Conference of Seventh-Day Adventists in 1910. He left this position two years later to become president of the Board of Directors of what is now Loma Linda University. The likely reason for this change was his failing health. He endured health problems until his death on May 23, 1913.

| Preceded by Ole Andres Olsen | President of the General Conference of Seventh-day Adventists; 1897–1901 | Succeeded by A. G. Daniells |
