= Seventh-day Adventist Commentary Reference Series =

- Abbreviation: SDA
- Type: Religious
- Location: USA
- Region served: Worldwide
- Parent organization: General Conference of Seventh-day Adventists

The Seventh-day Adventist Commentary Reference Series is a set of volumes produced primarily by Seventh-day Adventist scholars, and designed for both scholarly and popular level use. It includes the seven-volume Seventh-day Adventist Bible Commentary, the two-volume Seventh-day Adventist Encyclopedia, as well as the single volumes Seventh-day Adventist Bible Dictionary, Seventh-day Adventist Bible Students' Source Book and Handbook of Seventh-day Adventist Theology. The series is published by the church-owned Review and Herald Publishing Association.

The project began with the Bible Commentary, which was first published from 1953 to 1957. Francis D. Nichol served as the editor-in-chief, and oversaw 37 contributors which included associate editors Raymond Cottrell and Don Neufeld, and assistant editor Julia Neuffer. It was revised in 1980. The seventh (last) volume also contains various indexes. The Bible Dictionary was published in 1960 and revised in 1979. The Bible Students' Source Book was published in 1962. The Encyclopedia was published in 1966, with a "Revised Edition" in 1976 and a "Second Revised Edition" in 1996. The Handbook was published in 2000.

It was the first systematic expository of the entire Bible made by the Adventist church, the first such to consider the original, biblical languages behind the English text of the King James Version, and the first to consistently incorporate contemporary archaeological research to provide a historical context for interpretation.

== Volumes ==
The volumes include commentary (1–7) and other materials:

1. Genesis to Deuteronomy
2. Joshua to 2 Kings
3. 1 Chronicles to Song of Solomon
4. Isaiah to Malachi
5. Matthew to John
6. Acts to Ephesians
7. Philippians to Revelation
8. Bible Dictionary
9. Bible Students' Source Book
10. Encyclopedia: A–L
11. Encyclopedia: M–Z
12. Handbook of Seventh-day Adventist Theology

== Point of view ==
In his instructions to the contributors, Nichol explained the commentary was not "to crystallize once and for all a dogmatic interpretation". Where there were several notable interpretations, each major view was presented in a fair manner, but a consensus opinion of the editors was also given. It did not attempt to finalize doctrinal positions nor take stands on debatable points, but to assist readers in making their own conclusions. Cottrell said,

In instances where our collective judgment could not conscientiously support a particular traditionally held interpretation, we sought in an inoffensive way to present the evidence and give the reader an opportunity to make up his or her own mind. At times the expression 'Seventh-day Adventists have taught that...' or its equivalent was our ironic way of expressing collective editorial judgment that the interpretation so characterized is not exegetically valid. Accurate exegesis was our primary concern.

However, Nichol also required that no statement in the commentary should contradict the writings of Ellen White. So, the editors, who discovered that White sometimes interprets Scripture differently from what the original language or context implies, tried to justify such interpretations as homiletical (preaching, and/or to convince or persuade) rather than exegetical (strict interpretation).

== History ==
The idea for the commentary originated with J. D. Snider, book department manager of the Review and Herald Publishing Association, in response to a demand for an Adventist commentary like the classical commentaries of Jamieson-Fausset-Brown, Albert Barnes, or Adam Clarke. Snider and the Review and Herald board nominated Francis D. Nichol, who was editor-in-chief of the church's flagship publication, the Review and Herald (now the Adventist Review). After consulting with lecturers at the Seventh-day Adventist Theological Seminary and others, Nichol assembled a team to work on the commentary.

Nichol stated that the commentary would not have been possible without the theologically open climate in the church during the 1950s and 60s.

== Contributors ==
The full-time members of the team included editor-in-chief Francis Nichol, associate editors Don F. Neufeld and Raymond F. Cottrell, and assistant editor Julia Neuffer. In addition there were six part-time editors – Leona Running and Earle Hilgert, who were professors at the Seventh-day Adventist Theological Seminary; and Alger Johns, Herbert Douglass, Bernard Seton and James Cox, who were graduate students recommended by the Adventist Seminary. Although not officially a member of the commentary editorial team, archaeologist Siegfried Horn contributed throughout the project and submitted the most manuscript pages.

According to Cottrell,

Each writer received a formal contract that promised the munificent sum of one dollar per manuscript page—scarcely enough to pay for typing the manuscript! The privilege of participating in the project was, presumably, to be a writer's principal reward."

Most of the contributors were professors at Adventist colleges.

Each commentary volume contained a list of authors without identifying their contributions. Nichol adopted this approach to protect contributor privacy and because many submissions required substantial revision by the editors. Years later, Cottrell published a full list of contributors and their articles.

Nichol estimated that the editorial process required more than 77,000 hours.

== See also ==
- Seventh-day Adventist Church
- Francis D. Nichol
- Raymond Cottrell
- 1952 Bible Conference

== Bibliography ==
- Cottrell, Raymond (August 1985), "The Untold Story of the Bible Commentary" (PDF), Spectrum, 16 (3), Roseville, CA: Adventist Forums: 35–51, ISSN 0890-0264, archived from the original (PDF) on 28 July 2011.
