= International Missionary Society =

The International Missionary Society, Seventh-day Adventist Church, Reform Movement General Conference (IMSSDARM) is an independent Protestant denomination within Seventh Day Adventist Reform Movement that headquartered in Cedartown, Georgia, United States.

== History ==
Adventist doctrine had historically condemned war and told its followers not to serve as soldiers.

“The denomination of Christians calling themselves Seventh-day Adventist, taking the Bible as their rule of faith and practice are unanimous in their views that its teachings are contrary to the spirit and practice of war, hence they have ever been conscientiously opposed to bearing arms.” –Letter to Austin Blair, Governor of Michigan, August 3, 1864, (Signed) John Byington, J.N. Loughborough, Geo. W. Amadon, General Conference Committee.

However, in 1914, the warring governments in Europe pressured the Adventist leadership to allow military service for their young men. This was the official statement issued by the church leadership in Germany:

"Most honorable Lord General and Minister of War, August 4, 1914:

"…While we stand on the fundamentals of the Holy Scriptures, and seek to fulfill the precepts of Christendom, keeping the Rest Day (Saturday) that God established in the beginning, by endeavoring to put aside all work on that day, still in these times of stress, we have bound ourselves together in defense of the 'Fatherland,' and under these circum-stances we will also bear arms on Saturday (Sabbath)….” (Signed) “H.F. Schubert, President”

During the I world war, approximately two percent of Seventh-day Adventist members in more than 16 European countries were disfellowshipped from the church for their open opposition to war and their support of pacifism. In some countries, entire congregations and their elders, within just one week, found themselves deprived of church membership because of their stand on the war question and the Sabbath. Later in 1919, these became the International Missionary Society of the Seventh day Adventist organization in Germany.

=== Beginning of the Movement ===
After World War I, disfellowshipped Adventists in Europe decided to temporarily organize so as to legally hold representation before the SDA General Conference and hold their collective resources and support their ministers and workers.

Since some disfellowshipped Adventists in Germany had working with the International Missionary and Tract Society of the Seventh-day Adventist Church, they organized in 1919 in Germany as "Internationale Missionnsgesellshaft der Siebententags Adventisten Alte seit 1844 stehengebliebene Richtung Deutsche Union" (International Missionary Society of Seventh-day Adventists, old movement standing firm since 1844).

Sending at least 16 representatives of these new organizations, unsuccessfully attempted in 1920 and 1922 to reconcile their differences with the Seventh-day Adventist Church. At this point, the organization decided to continue independently from the Adventist Church. This move was facilitated by the discovery that an Adventist reform movement had been prophesied. These advent believers continue to used the name they registered in 1919, and in addition to that, they include Reform Movement in their name. Thus, the name International Missionary Society of the Seventh Day Adventist Reform Movement continued as the official name of the movement.

In November 18, 1921 representatives from different countries meet in Wurzburg, Germany, discussed their Principles of Faith, in harmony with the three angel’s messages based on the Bible and Testimony. At that same time, Bro O. Welp was elected as the leader of the General Conference of the IMSSDARM.

On 1925, the General Conference again convened, in Gotha, Thuringen. During this meeting they adopted their Principles of Faith that was discussed on 1921, and they approved as well to published the adopted principles under the publication title, “The Principles of Faith of the Seventh Day Adventist Reform Movement and Constitution. During this meeting, there was no discussion of any change of the name used by the Movement, which was International Missionary Society of the Seventh day Adventist Reform Movement.

On June 24-30 1928, a General Conference meeting was held in Isernhagen, Germany. On this meeting, the delegates approved to register the General Conference legally, and on 1929, the General Conference finally got registered. The name of the General Conference is : International Missionary Society of the Seventh Day Adventist Reform Movement, General Conference.

In April 1936, the Nazi government confiscated all IMSSDARM property in Germany. Many German IMSSDARM leaders and followers died in concentration camps. Some of them were allegedly denounced by members and leaders of the Seventh-day Adventist Church.

=== Post war schism ===
In 1945, the government wrote a letter to the leaders of the IMSDARM expressing their approval on the resumption of the normal religious activities of the International Missionary Society of the Seventh Day Adventist Reform Movement.

In 1948, the General Conference of the IMSSDARM convened again after a long time, to have a General Conference session. In this meeting, the delegates found out the two brethren, namely: Dumitru Nicolici and Brother Reich, rebelled against the leadership of the General Conference. These two brothers admitted of their wrongdoing and made a public confession before the delegates and was exonerated during the meeting. (Dumitru Nicolici then became the leader of the 51 Movement, named SDARM, after he again did rebellion against the leadership of the General Conference on May 1951 Session which form the SDARM group whose current headquarter is in Roanoke, VA)

Also on 1948 there were other leaders who were found out to be making rebellious act towards the General Conference that were discharged and disfellowshiped from the church and were no longer allowed to use the name of the church, International Missionary Society of the Seventh Adventist Reform Movement. American Union. But on 1952, these leaders who were discharged and disfellowshiped confessed that it was Dumitru Nicolici’s action that pushed them to rebelled against the GC because they thought that the GC was corrupt, but when the things were explained to them, they again placed their official and international connection to the leadership of the original Reform Movement IMSSDARM.

During the GC session as well in 1948, delegates decided to transfer the headquarter of the General Conference to America, and Dumitru Nicolici was tasked to find a suitable location for the headquarter. Unfortunately, he registered the church in America without the approval of the delegates but by some member of the Executive Committee and his wife and other who was not a member of the church. The name he registered was Seventh Day Adventist Reform Movement, General Conference. The submission for registration in the State of California was accepted by the government but without approval from the delegates of the church who is considered as the voice of God in the church.

In 1951, another General Conference session was held in Zeist, Holland on May. There were 25 official delegates on that meeting and translators. During the session on May 13, 1951, the delegates found out that Dumitru Nicolici and Lavrick, did not remit the money which belongs to the church, that they received from Fields, instead, they open an account in a bank without any approval from the delegates of the church, and they invested that money they collected into that secret account. On the 14th day of May 1951, both Nicolici and Lavrick signed a declaration letter that they will transfer that money into the account of the treasurer of the church, unfortunately, they were not faithful to their promises and kept the money of the church in their possession.

Also during this session, Nicolici and 10 other delegates withdraw their support to the leadership of the church by doing rebellion on the Morning of May 20, 1951. They organized themselves separately and call themselves “a new beginning in the reform movement”. They seized many properties and also monies of the church by claiming that they were at the time the new leaders of the church and thus many were deceived by them. They approved and used the name registered by Nicolici unlawfully in Sacramento, California and this was the beginning of the separate organization of the 51 Movement, SDARM. They accused Bro Carlos Kozel of defending two ministers whom they said having issues with seventh commandment, but during their separate meetings which they held in the hut, it was confirmed that Korpman was innocent of their accusations. After they left the meeting, Bro Kozel and the 14 delegates sent them a letter asking them to go back to the meeting but they refused to do, instead they replied by saying, “they are now in the new beginning of a new beginning in the reform movement”.

Within a few weeks, Bro Kozel went to the court to asked Nicolici to return the money he and Lavrick unlawfully withheld from the church. On may 7, 1952, an agreement was achieved in court, that Nicolici shall withdraw the money from the bank and give it to Bro Kozel immediately, and because Nicolici agreed to do it, the charged against him was dropped in the court.

Nicolici after, continued to function separately from the main church (IMSSDARM). They changed many things in the minutes of the previous sessions of the general conference. While Bro Kozel and the brethren continued as well to work for the church and slowly recovered the monies and properties that Nicolici and his group took from the church.

However, 15 years after, the group of Nicolici, namely, SDARM, wrote a letter to the International Missionary Society Seventh Day Adventist Reform Movement, expressing their desire to reunite to the IMSSDARM. They confessed on 1967 that the separation was tragic, unwarranted, and wrong. Some of them who were part of the 1951 rebellion admitted that they were deceived on 1951, even Nicolici himself in a signed document admitted that he was wrong in his action on 1951 and asked forgiveness to Bro Carlos Kozel. Unfortunately, the desired unification did not took place because the SDARM has a lot of demands to the IMSSDARM before they will finally reunite, which our church found out to be unfair. The last attempt for Unification happened on 1993, but still it was unsuccessful due to the same demand of position in the church that the SDARM asked to the IMSSDARM.

Until now, the 51 Movement (SDARM) continue their movement that was founded on the rebellion of Nicolici and ten other delegates on 1951 GC Session. But the International Missionary Society Seventh Day Adventist Church Reform Movement stand strong until today, having the same principles they have since the beginning of the Movement during the World War 1.

For more details and documents regarding these history. You can contact the International Missionary Society Seventh Day Adventist Church Reform Movement, General Conference thru its website: www.sda1888.org.

== Current structure ==
The organizational structure of IMSSDARM follows the original pattern of the Seventh-day Adventist Church. The denomination has churches, mission fields, districts, fields, unions, and the General Conference.

The highest governing body of the denomination, the General Conference Assembly, is composed of delegates from around the globe. It meets in full session every five years to elect a 13-member governing Board. The Board studies doctrinal issues and establishes missionary priorities. The 2017 Assembly was held in Tortoreto, Italy.

The new international headquarters facility in Cedartown, Georgia, U.S.A., was purchased in 2007 and is staffed by ministers, doctors, teachers, and missionaries. The Sabbath Watchman is the official publication.

IMSSDARM is represented in more than 100 countries. It has approximately 35,000 members with more than 73,000 congregants attending weekly church services.

== Doctrine ==
IMSSDARM adherents worship on the seventh-day Sabbath (Saturday) and profess belief in Jesus Christ as Lord and Saviour. The organization holds the Bible to be inerrant and acknowledges the writings of Ellen G. White to be part of the Spirit of prophecy (inspired writings) for the last days.

IMSSDARM attaches much importance to their name, historical roots, and Adventist doctrines. Points of difference with the Seventh-day Adventist Church, besides conscientious objection to war, include the view that abortion and homosexuality violate God's will, a refusal to participate in political activity, the upholding of the marriage institution as sacred before God, a refusal to participate in ecumenism and labor unions, and advocacy of health principles, such as vegetarianism and natural healing, while abstaining from alcohol, tobacco, and drugs.

The IMSSDARM states that it does not divide into different churches on the basis of language, ethnic, or racial differences.
