= Francis M. Wilcox =

American seventh-day Adventist leader

Francis McLellan Wilcox (1865–1951) was a Seventh-day Adventist minister, administrator and editor of the Review and Herald (now the Adventist Review) for 33 years.

== Biography ==
He was an early student of South Lancaster Academy (today Atlantic Union College). After graduation he spent four years in evangelism in New York (1886–1890). On July 16, 1889, he was ordained at the Rome, New York, camp meeting presided over by Ellen G. White. During the 1890s he served in a variety of editorial posts. From 1897 to 1909 he served as chaplain at the Colorado Sanitarium located in Boulder, Colorado. In 1909 he became associate editor of the Review and Herald, and two years later became editor (a post he would hold until his retirement in 1944). During his tenure as editor he served for a time as president of the Review and Herald Publishing Association. He was one of the original members of the Ellen G. White Estate board of trustees appointed by Ellen G. White and later served as chairman of their board. Wilcox was also one of the participants of the 1919 Bible Conference.

== Books published ==
- Facing the Crisis (1920)
- The Fall of Jerusalem (1920?)
- The Coming Crisis (1933)
- What the Bible Teaches (1926)
- The Testimony of Jesus (1934)
- The Gospel of Health (1935)
- Seventh-day Adventists in Time of War (1936)
- Day by Day: a compilation of Bible texts and topics (1937)
- The Early and Latter Rain (1938)
- The More Abundant Life (1939)
- Quit Yourselves Like Men: an open letter to our young men in camp and field (1940)
- Heart-to-Heart Talks (1948)
- Divine Revelation (194-?)

== See also ==
- History of the Seventh-day Adventist Church

Preceded by John Luis Shaw	Chairperson of the Ellen G. White Estate; 1938 – 1944	Succeeded by Milton E. Kern
Preceded by W. A. Spicer	Editor of the Adventist Review; 1911 – 1944	Succeeded by W. A. Spicer
