= Milton E. Kern =

American Seventh-day Adventist

Milton Earl Kern (1875–1961) was an American Seventh-day Adventist educator and youth leader. Over the course of his career, he served as head of the bible and history departments at Union College, president of the Foreign Mission Seminary, and dean of the Advanced Bible School. He was also the field secretary of the Seventh-day Adventist General Conference from 1943 until his retirement in 1951.

== Early life and education ==
Kern attended Union College in Lincoln, Nebraska, where he met his wife Floy Pierce, who was also a student. The pair married in 1900.

== Career ==
From 1900 to 1904, Kern was head of the Bible and history departments at Union College. His success in working for Adventist young people led to a position as secretary of the young people's department of the Central Union Conference.

At the General Conference Council held in 1907, at which the General Conference organized a "Young People's Department", he became the first chair of the department, with Matilda Erickson as the first secretary. Later in the year, the new department was re-named the "Young People's Missionary Volunteer Department."

From 1910 to 1914, Kern was president of the Foreign Mission Seminary (now Washington Adventist University). During the 1920s, he spent most of his time overseas building Missionary Volunteer Societies. In 1933, he became dean of the Advanced Bible School, which in 1936 became the Seventh-day Adventist Theological Seminary.

In 1943, he became field secretary of the General Conference and chair of the Ellen G. White Estate board of trustees. Kern retired in 1951 and moved to California.

== Personal life and death ==
Kern died on Friday 22 December 1961. He had been predeceased by his wife. Kern was survived by their only daughter.

== See also ==
Preceded by Francis M. Wilcox	Chairperson of the Ellen G. White Estate; 1944 – 1951	Succeeded by Denton E. Rebok
Preceded by (founding)	Dean of the Seventh-day Adventist Theological Seminary; 1934 – 1943	Succeeded by Denton E. Rebok
