= SDARM General Conference =

Governing body for the Seventh Day Adventist Reform Movement

SDARM General Conference is the governing authority for the Seventh Day Adventist Reform Movement denomination. Officers of the General Conference are elected at a delegation session composed of delegates from the various international units and serve for a four-year term. The last delegation session was held August 25 to September 8, 2015 in Roanoke, Virginia, United States.

== Officers ==
President

Term	President	Nationality
1925–1934	Otto Welp	Germany
1934–1942	Wilhelm Maas	Germany
1942–1948	Albert Mueller	Germany
1948–1951	Carlos Kozel	Germany
1951–1959	Dumitru Nicolici	Romania
1959–1963	Andre Lavrik	Romania
1963–1967	Clyde T. Stewart	Australia
1967–1979	Francisco Devai	Brazil
1979–1983	Wilhelm Volpp	Germany
1983–1991	João Moreno	Brazil
1991–1995	Neville S. Brittain	Australia
1995–2003	Alfredo Carlos Sas	Brazil
2003–2011	Duraisamy Sureshkumar	India
2011–2019	Davi Paes Silva	Brazil
2019–Present	Eli Tenorio	Brazil

1st Vice-President

Term	Vice-President	Nationality
1928–1931	Wilhelm Maas	Germany
1931–1948	vacant	
1948–1951	Albert Mueller	Germany
1951–1959	Andre Lavrik	Romania
1959–1963	Dumitru Nicolici	Romania
1963–1967	Emmerich Kanyo Benedek	Austria
1967–1971	Ivan W. Smith	Australia
1971–1979	Wilhelm Volpp	Germany
1979–1987	Francisco Devai Lucacin	Brazil
1987–1995	Daniel Dumitru	Argentina
1995–1997	Neville S. Brittain	Australia
1997–1999	vacant	
1999–2003	Duraisamy Sureshkumar	India
2003–2011	Davi Paes Silva	Brazil
2011–2015	Duraisamy Sureshkumar	India
2015–2019	Peter Lausevic	Australia
2019–2024	Rolly Dumaguit	Philippines
2024-Present	David Zic	Canadá

Secretary

Term	Secretary	Nationality
1925–1934	Wilhelm Maas	Germany
1934–1948	Alfred Rieck	Germany
1948–1951	Dumitru Nicolici	Romania
1951–1955	Clyde T. Stewart	Australia
1955–1963	Ivan W. Smith	Australia
1963–1967	Alfons Balbach	Lituania
1967–1971	Alex Norman Macdonald	United States
1971–1980	Alfons Balbach	Lituania
1980–1987	Alex Norman Macdonald	United States
1987–1995	Alfredo Carlos Sas	Brazil
1995–1999	Davi Paes Silva	Brazil
1999–2001	John Garbi	United States
2001–2003	Benjamin Burec	United States
2003–2007	David Zic	Canada
2007–2011	Paul Balbach	Brazil
2011–2019	Eli Tenorio	Brazil
2019–Present	Liviu Tudoroiu	Romania

Treasurer

Term	Treasurer	Nationality
1925–1928	Albert Krahe	Germany
1928–1934	Wilhelm Maas	Germany
1934–1948	Otto Welp	Germany
1948–1951	Carlos Kozel	Argentina
1951–1955	LaVeta Ehrlich	United States
1955–1959	Ivan W. Smith	Australia
1959–1963	Helen Rogel	United States
1963–1967	Edith Lavrik	United States
1967–1971	Alex Norman Macdonald	United States
1971–1975	John Baer	Canada
1975–1979	Benjamin Burec	United States
1979–1991	John Garbi	United States
1991–1999	Ruffo Lopez Trivino	Ecuador
1999–2011	Roberto Martins Duarte	Brazil
2011–2025	Rudolfo Gessner	Brazil
2025-Present	Wagner Guidini	Brazil

== See also ==
- Seventh Day Adventist Reform Movement
