= Ludwig R. Conradi =

German evangelist and missionary

Ludwig Richard Conradi
- Born: 20 March 1856; Karlsruhe, German Confederation
- Died: September 16, 1939; Hamburg, Germany

Ludwig R. Conradi (or Louis R. Conradi; 20 March 1856 – 16 September 1939) was one of the leaders of European Adventism known for the controversy causing schism in the church, a Seventh-day Adventist evangelist and missionary, and in his last years a Seventh Day Baptist minister.

== Biography ==
Born in Karlsruhe, as a young man he migrated to America. He was converted in 1878 to the Seventh-day Adventist faith. In 1879, he met Ellen G. White, attended the Battle Creek College, and then worked in Middle West for the German-speaking people. In 1882, he was ordained to the ministry.

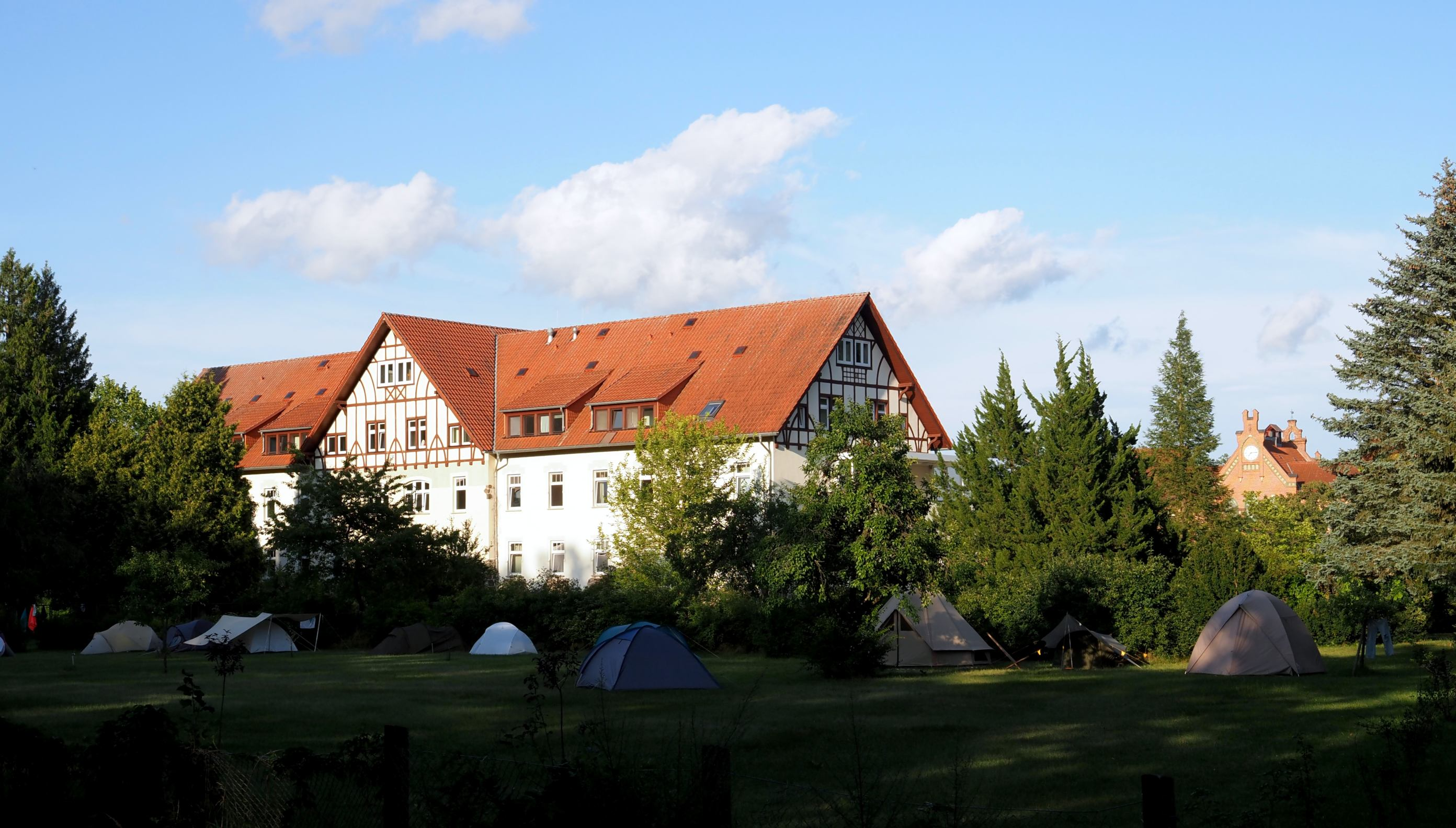
Ludwig R. Conradi initiated founding of Friedensau Adventist University. The retirement home from 1907, now students' home, is named after him.

In 1886, the General Conference of the Adventist Church sent him to work in Europe. He traveled widely throughout Germany, Switzerland, Russia, Turkey, Romania and Hungary. He was often pursued by the police.

In 1889, he established the headquarters of the German Seventh-day Adventist Church in Hamburg. In 1901, he became the first chairman of the General European Conference, then later a president of the European Division and the vice-president of the General Conference. He remained head of the work in Europe until 1922.

In 1909 and 1914, he traveled extensively in South America, where new conferences were being organized. He also made missionary journeys into Africa and the Middle and Far East. During the war he tried to have the church members support the German war effort and persecute those who resisted and caused a split in the Adventist church and the formation of the Seventh Day Adventist Reform Movement who resisted his decisions.

In 1932, he left the Adventist Church and became a member and minister at the Seventh Day Baptists.

His written works include a revision and enlargement of J. N. Andrews' History of the Sabbath and his own expositions of the books of Daniel and the Revelation were translated into several languages.
