= Raymond Cottrell =

American theologian and missionary (1911–2003)

- Born: April 21, 1911; Los Angeles, California
- Died: January 12, 2003 (aged 91); Calimesa, California
- Occupations: Theologian, missionary, teacher, writer and editor
- Theological work
- Tradition or movement: Adventist

Raymond Forrest Cottrell (April 21, 1911, Los Angeles, California – January 12, 2003, Calimesa, California) was an Adventist theologian, missionary, teacher, writer and editor. He was an associate editor of both the Adventist Review (the church's official news magazine) and the Seventh-day Adventist Bible Commentary. Raymond Cottrell, is seen by some as a "progressive Adventist", as he disagreed with certain traditional positions of the church, including the investigative judgment, and served in an editorial role for the independently owned and operated magazine Adventist Today. He was a consulting editor to Spectrum magazine, another independent Adventist paper, both which leaned to progressive Adventist viewpoints. He was the first Adventist to become a member of a scholarly theological society, and was instrumental in the founding of the Biblical Research Institute.

== Personal life ==
Raymond Cottrell was born on April 21, 1911, in Los Angeles, into a family which already had a long history within the Adventist church. His great-grandfather Roswell F. Cottrell was a Seventh Day Baptist who first listened to William Miller before 1844 and the Great Disappointment, yet did not become a follower. He became a Seventh-day Adventist in 1851.

Cottrell was married to Elizabeth (who was born May 20, 1912, in Phoenix, Arizona).

== Career ==
From 1930 to 1934 Cottrell worked as a church pastor in the Pacific Union Conference. From 1934 to 1941 he served in the China Division (which dissolved in 1952, now the Chinese Union Mission ) of the church as an administrator and educator, assisted in missionary work by his wife. They left early because of the hostilities with Japan during World War II, returning to America.

Cottrell taught biblical exegesis at Pacific Union College for 10 or 11 years, while Elizabeth worked in the business office for several years.

Following this appointment, Francis D. Nichol called him to the Review and Herald Publishing Association to commence work on the new Seventh-day Adventist Bible Commentary. The pair arrived in Takoma Park, Maryland, in late September 1952, and Cottrell began work on the Commentary on October 1. (Elizabeth worked in the Review Book Billing Department until her retirement in 1977.) During the next five years, Cottrell reported he spent over 15,000 hours studying the Bible, covering every verse. As well as holding the position of associate editor, Cottrell also contributed 2,000 pages to the series, the third largest number of manuscript pages of any author. Yet including his editorial work he probably had more input than any other writer into the Commentary.

Articles written by Cottrell for the commentary included "The Role of Israel in Old Testament Prophecy" and others. In this article he wrote that the original subject of the Old Testament predictive prophecies was the nation of Israel, their fulfillment being conditional on the response of the Jewish people to the covenant and on accepting the Messiah. However, due to the "overriding pastoral concern" of Nichol, the editor-in-chief overruled the consensus of the other editors – one of only two or three occasions when he did so. He also wrote numerous articles for the Seventh-day Adventist Bible Dictionary and Encyclopedia on topics in Bible and theology.

Cottrell's critiques of the manuscript of Questions on Doctrine (published in 1957), were "mostly unheeded" by its authors and "might have prevented much of the upheaval that followed the publication of the book", according to Julius Nam.

In 1957 Nichol invited him to be an associate editor of the Adventist Review, a position he held for 7 years. He worked for another 7 years as a book editor. Cottrell also served as a member of the Biblical Research Committee (now the Biblical Research Institute).

He retired in 1977, to Calimesa, California. There he served at Loma Linda University as an adjunct faculty member of the religion department. He also worked for the General Conference and for the Southeastern California Conference on various commissions and projects.

Then Cottrell founded Adventist Today, an independent progressive Adventist magazine first published in 1993. He and others at Loma Linda had conceived of the idea for a new magazine in the autumn of the previous year. As well as contributing articles, he was editor and had the title of editor emeritus for the remainder of his life.

On February 6, 2002, Cottrell's paper "The 'Sanctuary Doctrine' – Asset or Liability?" was presented by Larry Christoffel at the San Diego, California Adventist Forum in the Tierrasanta Adventist church. His paper deals with the history of the Adventist sanctuary doctrine and argues against William Miller's Biblical interpretation of the "2,300 evenings and mornings" of Daniel 8:14. Miller believed these were literal years, ending in 1844. The Adventist church adopted Miller's view and today forms part of its official beliefs. Cottrell's exegesis of Daniel contends that the historical Adventist sanctuary doctrine can not be sustained using any part of the book of Daniel; specifically Daniel 8:14. As such, this paper is as significant as the one presented by Dr. Desmond Ford at Glacier View; a paper which cost Dr. Ford his ministerial credentials. Christoffel responded in his own paper.

His wife Elizabeth died on August 2, 2002, in Calimesa. Raymond died the following year on January 12, 2003, also in Calimesa. He was survived by three adopted children – Ric W. Cottrell, Richard E Cottrell and Peggy J Tomat, his brother Leland Horton Cottrell, four grandsons, sixteen great-grandchildren.

== Theology ==
Cottrell described the theological climate of the church as open, favourable and honest during the 1950s when the Seventh-day Adventist Encyclopedia was published. Nearly all of Cottrell's papers in his Manuscript Collection were unpublished. He said of his "significant work" Eschatology of Daniel which was never formally published, "the manuscript awaits a climate of openness and objectivity in the church, which is essential to a fair examination of the facts." Cottrell has been said to have taken a few progressive positions. It has been argued that Cottrell's began to take more progressive viewpoints after retirement.
