= William A. Spicer =

American Seventh-day Adventist minister (1865–1952)

William Ambrose Spicer
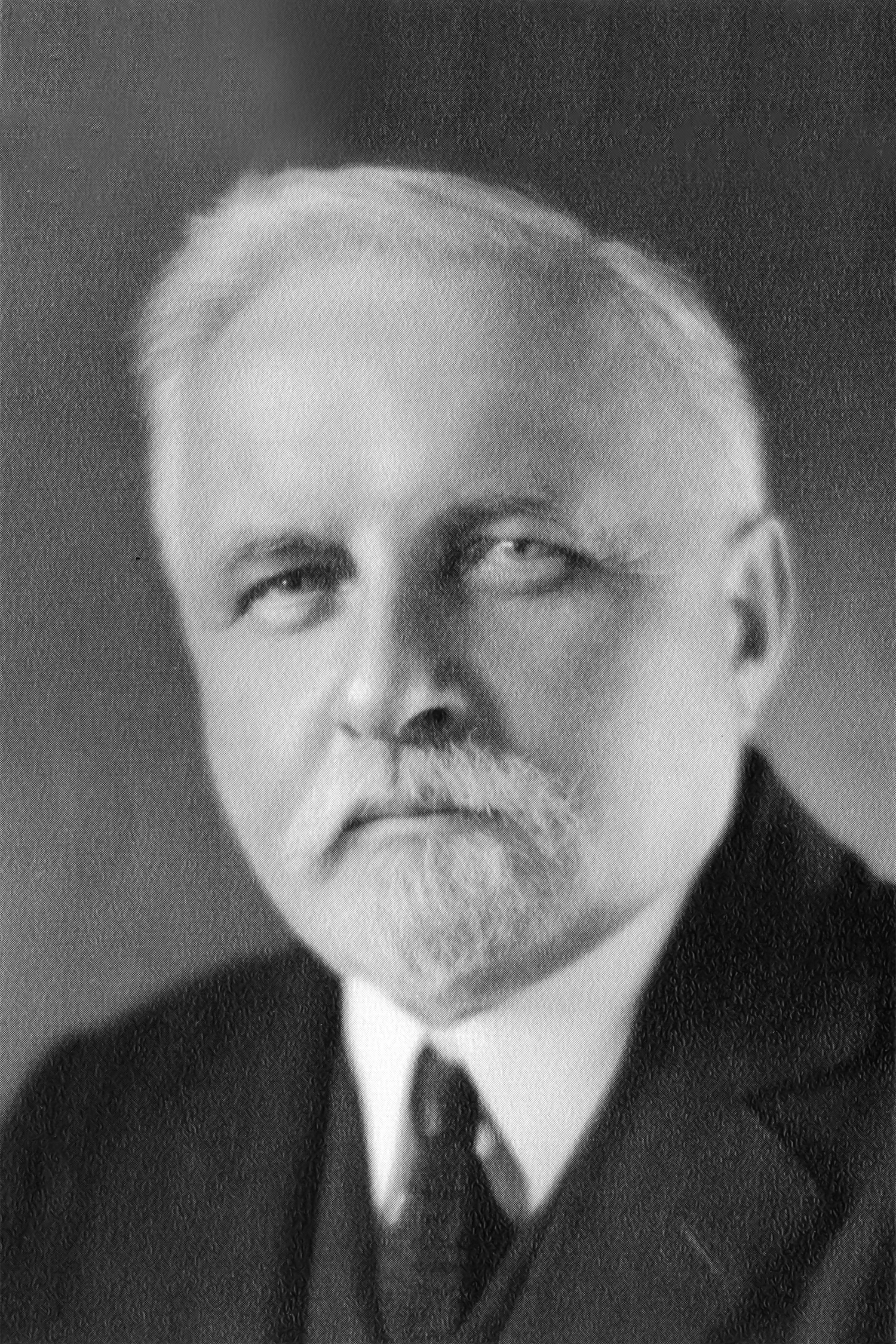
- Born: December 19, 1865; Freeborn, Minnesota
- Died: October 17, 1952 (aged 86); Takoma Park, Maryland
- Occupations: Protestant, Seventh-day Adventist president
- Years active: 70 years
- Known for: Writing, travels, leadership
- Notable work: Our Day in the Light of Prophecy, Miracles of Modern Missions, Certainties of the Advent Movement
- Parent(s): Ambrose Coates Spicer and Susanne Coon (Seventh Day Baptists)

William Ambrose Spicer (December 19, 1865 – October 17, 1952) was a Seventh-day Adventist minister and president of the General Conference of Seventh-day Adventists. He was born December 19, 1865, in Freeborn, Minnesota, in the United States in a Seventh Day Baptist home. Spicer worked for the church in the United States, England and India, where Spicer College is named after him. He served as Secretary of the General Conference during the presidency of A. G. Daniells and Daniells served as the Secretary during Spicer's years as president. The two men led the Adventist Church for the first 30 years of the 20th century.

== 1887–1903 ==
Spicer's responsibilities with the church during this time included assisting Stephen Haskell as his secretary. This led 22-year-old Spicer to England. There he gained experience as an editor of The Present Truth and in assisting with evangelistic campaigns. In 1892, he returned to the United States and served as Secretary of the recently established (1889) Foreign Missions Board. This began decades of Spicer's leadership in the SDA Church's mission development.

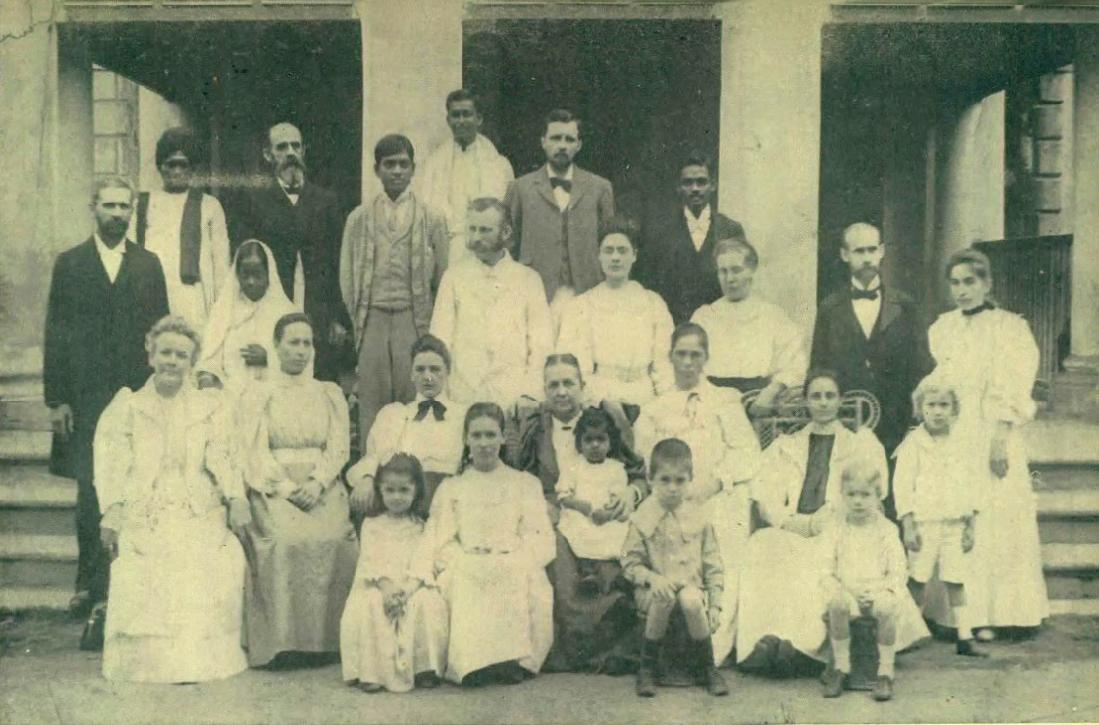
W. A. Spicer: 1898 in India. (Second from the right in back row.)

In 1898, Spicer worked in India as editor of the Oriental Watchman.

== Secretary of the General Conference, 1903–1922 ==
As Secretary to the General Conference, Spicer assisted President Daniells in shaping the church's response to issues. Daniell's crises were met often in collaboration with Spicer: the reorganization of the church accomplished at the 1901 and 1903 General Conference sessions; the denominational dispute between Daniells and Kellogg; racial issues arising; etc.

Spicer and Daniells led the church in a strong mission emphasis. New opportunities brought about the reorganization of existing institutions and the creation of new ones. Spicer viewed these opportunities to spread the Adventist "message" as a sign of fulfilled prophecy. In 1914, he reported to the SDA world church, "... And the same living God who launched the definite advent movement on its way at the exact time of the prophecy (1844), began at the same time in a special way to open the doors of access to 'every nation, and kindred, and tongue, and people.' We have seen the way open again and again immediately before our own feet as the heralds of the third angel's message have entered the various lands."

Spicer reported on the conflict between Kellogg and the General Conference leadership. He met with Kellogg to discuss what was considered pantheistic ideas.

The Seventh Day Adventist Reform Movement had come about as a result of the actions of L. R. Conradi and certain European church leaders during the war, who decided that it was acceptable for Adventists to take part in war, which was in clear opposition to the historical position of the church that had always upheld the non-combative position. Since the American Civil War, Adventists were known as non-combatants, and had done work in hospitals or given medical care rather than taken combat roles. The General Conference of Seventh-day Adventists sent Spicer to investigate the changes. He was unable to resolve the schism.

== President of the General Conference, 1922–1930 ==
With the experience acquired as General Conference Secretary, Spicer was elected as president of the General Conference during the 1922 General Conference session. He continued with the church's mission commitment which led to a further expansion of the Adventist message throughout the world. He was known in the church as an enthusiastic editor and successful author an influential preacher, proficient organizer and a passionate missionary.

== See also ==
- History of the Seventh-day Adventist Church

Preceded by A. G. Daniells	President of the General Conference of Seventh-day Adventists; 1922–1930	Succeeded by Charles H. Watson
Preceded by W. W. Prescott	Editor of the Adventist Review; 1909–1911	Succeeded by F. M. Wilcox
Preceded by F. M. Wilcox	Editor of the Adventist Review; 1945 (for six months)	Succeeded by Francis D. Nichol
