= Davi Paes Silva =

Davi Paes Silva was the President of the Seventh Day Adventist Reform Movement (SDARM), a post to which he was elected in September 2011. He also holds the position of Editorial Committee Director. As a minister, Davi Paes Silva helps as pastor for the Roanoke SDARM Church in Virginia, USA.

Born 24 February 1945, in Brazil, he was baptised as a member of the SDARM on 11 November 1961 and entered the missionary training institution of the Brazilian Union of that denomination located in the city of São Paulo that year. He married his wife, Alexandrina Bertelli, five years later on 27 February 1966. He has two children, Julio Cesar Bertelli Silva (born 21 April 1969) and Sandra Valquiria Bertelli Silva (born 16 August 1970).

Ordained to the ministry February 27, 1977, Silva rose through the denominational structure serving as a colporteur leader, then youth leader of the São Paulo Field, then youth leader of the Brazilian Union and eventually Corporate Secretary for the Brazilian Union. During the General Conference delegation session held in Bushkill, Pensilvannia, in 1979, he was recognized for his service by being elected to the position of worldwide youth director for the denomination. From 1987 to 1995 he served as regional secretary for South America.

In 1995, at the General Conference delegation session held in Romania, he was elected as Corporate Secretary for the denomination and at this time moved his residence to Roanoke, Virginia, USA, a short distance from the headquarters of the denomination in Roanoke. In 1999, he was elected as Regional Secretary for North America, a position he held until being elected 1st Vice-President in 2003. He also held a number of additional positions within the same organization, including Welfare Department Director and Secretary of the Doctrinal Working Committee. He was the organization President, a post to which he was elected in September 2011.

He is the author of the book Saved By Grace, published in 2003 in three main languages: English, Portuguese, and Spanish. Later the same book was translated into Korean, Romanian, Ukrainian, Chinese and Shilube, a local language in the Democratic Republic of Congo. In the beginning of 2012 two other books by the same author were published in Portuguese language: A Ciencia da Salvacao (The Science of Salvation) and Conflito e Vitoria (Conflict and Victory).
