= Hal Taussig =

American academic

Hal Taussig is a retired professor and a progressive United Methodist pastor, and author focusing on early Christianity.

== Biography ==
Taussig received a B.A from Antioch College, and M.Div. from Methodist Theological School in Ohio and a Ph.D. from Union Institute & University. He taught at Union Theological Seminary for 17 years; as well as Reconstructionist Rabbinical College and Chestnut Hill College; and was co-pastor at Chestnut Hill United Church in Philadelphia; as well as a fellow of the Jesus Seminar. He is a supporter of grassroots liberal or progressive Christianity.

Taussig was chair of the 19-member council of scholars and religious leaders which compiled the book A New New Testament, which added 10 newly discovered texts from early Christianity such as the Gospel of Thomas, the Gospel of Mary, and the Acts of Paul and Thecla to the standard New Testament canon. Although Taussig doesn't believe the New Testament is incomplete, he believes new material "elucidates it and expands it." Some of the choices for books to include have been controversial, with some authors saying they shouldn't have included new texts at all, and others saying even more should be added.

Taussig has also authored and co-authored multiple books including After Jesus Before Christianity, Jesus Before God, Re-imagining Life Together in America and Jesus and Wisdom's Feast. After Jesus Before Christianity, which was co-authored with Erin Vearncombe and Brandon Scott, explores early Christianity in line with Walter Bauer's Orthodoxy and Heresy in Earliest Christianity which argues that the early Christian movement was much more diverse than previously believed; as well as exploring concepts of family, identity, and gender in the early church.
