= Andrews University Seminary Studies =

Academic journal

- Discipline: Christian theology
- Language: English, French, German
- Edited by: Oliver Glanz and Martin F. Hanna

Publication details
- History: 1963–present
- Publisher: Seventh-day Adventist Theological Seminary (United States)
- Frequency: Biannually

Standard abbreviations
- ISO 4: Andrews Univ. Semin. Stud.

Indexing
- ISSN: 0003-2980
- LCCN: 74645601
- OCLC no.: 470176965

Links
- Journal homepage

Andrews University Seminary Studies is a biannual peer-reviewed academic journal published by the Seventh-day Adventist Theological Seminary at Andrews University. It was established in 1963 and publishes research articles and brief notes on biblical archaeology and history of antiquity, the Hebrew Bible, New Testament, church history of all periods, historical, biblical, and systematic theology, ethics, history of religion and mission, and Christian ministry and education. The journal is abstracted and indexed in the ATLA Religion Database.

== Editors-in-chief ==
The following persons are or have been editors-in-chief of the journal:

- Siegfried H. Horn (1963–1974)
- Kenneth A. Strand (1974–1988)
- George R. Knight and Kenneth A. Strand (1988–1991)
- Nancy J. Vyhmeister and Kenneth A. Strand (1991–1994)
- Nancy J. Vyhmeister (1994–2000)
- Jerry Moon (2000–2005)
- Jerry Moon and John Reeve (2005–2010)
- John Reeve (2010–2014)
- John Reeve and Martin Hanna (2014–2021)
- Oliver Glanz and Martin F. Hanna (2021–present)

== See also ==
- Seventh-day Adventist Church
