= Seventh-day Adventist Theological Seminary =

Coordinates: 41°57′42.7″N 86°21′28.8″W

The Seventh-day Adventist Theological Seminary (SDATS) is the seminary located at Andrews University in Michigan, the Seventh-day Adventist Church's flagship university. Since 1970 the SDATS has been accredited by the Association of Theological Schools in the United States and Canada. It is a part of the Seventh-day Adventist education system, the world's second largest Christian school system.

== History ==
The earliest ministerial education in the Seventh-day Adventist Church was simple conversion of ministers from other denominations and an apprentice-type of arrangement where aspiring ministers worked along those of more experience. Later, ministerial institutes were incorporated into the Battle Creek College curriculum. By the 1910s Arthur G. Daniells began to make calls for more ministerial education. These attempts were not realized until the beginning of the "Advanced Bible Training School" on the campus of Pacific Union College in 1934. The fledgling Seminary moved to the campus of Washington Missionary College in 1937 and renamed the Seventh-day Adventist Theological Seminary.

== Organization ==
The Seminary consists of seven departments: Practical and Applied Theology, Church History, Discipleship and Lifespan Education, New Testament, Old Testament, Theology and Christian Philosophy, and World Mission. A number of study centers and institutes are also attached to the Seminary: Center for Youth Evangelism (CYE), North American Division Evangelism Institute (NADEI), Center for Community Change, Institute for Jewish-Christian Study, Institute of Archaeology, the Institute of World Mission, Christian Leadership Center, and the Greek Manuscript Research Center.

== Enrollment ==
In 1961 the Seminary had an enrollment of 129. By 2007 the Seminary's enrollment had increased to 768 students. The Seminary offers professional and academic programs. Professional programs include the Master of Divinity, the MA in Pastoral Ministry, the MA in Youth and Young Adult Ministry, the Doctor of Ministry (D.Min.), and the Doctor of Missiology. Academic programs include the MA (Religion), the MA (Religious Education), the Doctor of Philosophy (Religion), the Doctor of Philosophy (Ph.D.) (Religious Education), the Doctor of Philosophy (Biblical and Ancient Near Eastern Archaeology), and the Doctor of Theology (Th.D.). Three of these programs are offered at various sites in the U.S. and overseas (MA (Religion), MA in Pastoral Ministry, and the DMin). As of 2010, its total enrollment is over 1200 students.

== Horn Archeological Museum ==
In 1970 the Seminary opened up an archeological museum. The core collection of several hundred items came from Siegfried H. Horn and other donors. The museum was named in honor of Dr. Horn in 1979.

== Presidents and Deans ==
The Advanced Bible School (1934-1937) was the forerunner of the Seventh-day Adventist Theological Seminary. In addition, the SDA Theological Seminary became part of Potomac University from 1957-1960, which in 1960 merged with Emmanuel Missionary College, in Berrien Springs, Michigan, to become Andrews University.

Presidents

- Milton E. Kern (1934-1943)
- Denton E. Rebok (1943-1951)
- Vernon Edwards Hendershot (1951-1952)
- Ernest D. Dick (1952-1959)

Deans

- Charles E. Weniger (1959)
- William Gordon Campbell Murdoch (1959-1973)
- Siegfried H. Horn (1973-1976)
- Thomas H. Blincoe (1976-1981)
- Gerhard F. Hasel (1981-1988)
- Raoul Dederen (1988, Acting; 1989-1991)
- Werner K. Vyhmeister (1991-2000)
- John K. McVay (2000-2006)
- Denis Fortin (2006-2013)
- Jiří Moskala (2013–present)

== See also ==
- Andrews University
- Andrews University Seminary Studies
- Seventh-day Adventist Church
- List of Seventh-day Adventist hospitals
- List of Seventh-day Adventist medical schools
- List of Seventh-day Adventist secondary schools
- List of Seventh-day Adventist colleges and universities
