= A. G. Daniells =

American Seventh-day Adventist minister (1858–1935)

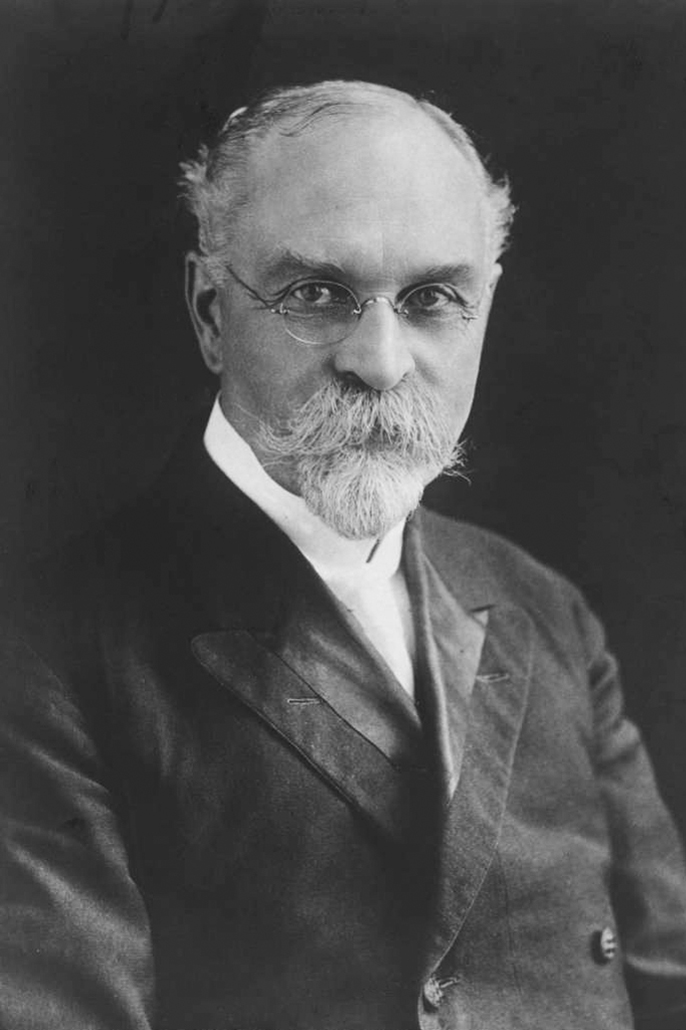
- A. G. Daniells

10th President of the General Conference of Seventh day Adventists
- In office 1901–1922
- Preceded by: George A. Irwin
- Succeeded by: William Ambrose Spicer

Personal details
- Born: September 28, 1858 West Union, Iowa
- Died: March 22, 1935 (aged 76) Glendale Sanitarium, Glendale, CA
- Spouse: Mary Ellen (Hoyt) (m. 1876)
- Occupation: Author, minister, missionary and church leader
- Known for: President of the General Conference of Seventh-day Adventists

Arthur Grosvenor Daniells (September 28, 1858 – April 18, 1935) was an American Seventh-day Adventist minister and administrator, most notably the longest serving president of the General Conference. He began to work for the church in Texas in 1878 with Robert M. Kilgore and also served as secretary to James and Ellen White for one year, and later worked as an evangelist. In 1886, he was called to New Zealand, and was one of the pioneers of the Seventh-day Adventist Church in the South Pacific. Daniells had astounding success through his dynamic preaching and on October 15, 1887, he opened the first Seventh-day Adventist church in New Zealand at Ponsonby. While there he served as president of the New Zealand Conference (1889 to 1891), and of the Australia Conference (1892 to 1895). Later, he became the president of the Australasia Union Conference before becoming president of the General Conference in 1901. Daniells continued his term as General Conference president until 1922.

== Biography ==
Born in Iowa, he was the son of a Union Army surgeon who died in the American Civil War. At the age of 10 he was converted to the Seventh-day Adventist faith being baptized by pastor George Butler, and in 1875 entered Battle Creek College (now Andrews University), remaining only one year because of ill health. After he and his wife taught in public schools for one year, he received a call to the ministry. Feeling timid and unprepared, he hesitated, but after praying earnestly, he came under conviction. He began his ministry in 1878 with Robert M. Kilgore in Texas. He was then secretary to James and Ellen White for one year, and later an evangelist in Iowa.

In 1886, he was called as pioneer missionary to New Zealand, and remained in the South Pacific for 14 years. From 1889 to 1891 he was president of the New Zealand Conference and from 1892 to 1895 of the Australian Conference. When Ellen White went to Australia in 1891, he became closely associated with her. On the formation of the Central Australian Conference in 1895, he became its first president. In 1897, the Australasian Union Conference was organized. This was the first of a new level of church government. Daniells served as its first president. This allowed all the organizations of the church in the South Pacific to have regional oversight. Up to this point, the General Conference at Battle Creek had such oversight. When Daniells returned to North America, he led the church in developing this new level of church government as a matter of policy.

He assumed the presidency of the General Conference in 1901 at a difficult period in the history of the church, but he met with ability financial and organizational problems and the task of moving the headquarters of the denomination to Washington, D.C. He traveled extensively on all continents, convinced of the necessity of getting his information firsthand. The reforms and reorganization that took place during his period of office led to great expansion of the church throughout the world. In 1922 he was not reelected as General Conference president and replaced by William A. Spicer. In his retirement Daniells formed the Seventh-day Adventist Ministerial Association and Ministry magazine.

== Books ==
- The Worldwide Progress of the Advent Message (1904)
- The World War: Its Relation to the Eastern Question and Armageddon (1917)
- A World in Perplexity. Review and Herald Publishing Association. 1918. OL 23660937M.
- Christ Our Righteousness. Review and Herald Publishing Association. 1926. ISBN 978-0-8280-0482-4.
- The Abiding Gift of Prophecy (1936) (online at the Ellen G. White Estate website (Adventist Archives version DjVu))

Preceded by George A. Irwin	President of the General Conference of Seventh-day Adventists; 1901 – 1922	Succeeded by William Ambrose Spicer
Preceded by (first chairperson)	Chairperson of the Ellen G. White Estate; 1915 – 1935	Succeeded by John Edwin Fulton
