= List of Pacific Union College alumni =

This is a list of notable alumni of Pacific Union College, a private liberal arts college in Napa Valley, California.

The college has been described as a "training ground for an inordinately large number of outstanding physicians, dentists, nurses, teachers and theologians." A large majority of students who graduate from the college do so with degrees in the health sciences. Most of PUC's notable alumni include individuals in academic administration or political offices, though some have been recognized in other fields.

== Alumni ==
| Name | Class year | Notability | References |
|---|---|---|---|
| Arna Bontemps | 1923 | Harlem Renaissance poet | |
| Marnie Breckenridge | 1993 | Soprano opera soloist | |
| John Burden | 1889 | Founder of the Loma Linda University Medical Center and Glendale Adventist Medical Center; also assisted in the founding of Sydney Adventist Hospital | |
| Harold W. Clark | | Creationist in the mid-20th century | |
| Jon Dybdahl | 1965 | President of Walla Walla University 2002–2006 | |
| Neville Eden Gallimore | 1961 | Former cabinet minister and member of the Parliament as a member of the Jamaica Labour Party | |
| Larry Geraty | 1962 | Second president of La Sierra University, and former president of the American Schools of Oriental Research | |
| James G. Haughton | 1948 | Physician and public health administrator | |
| Philip Guthrie Hoffman | 1938 | Fifth president of the University of Houston, and the first chancellor of the University of Houston System | |
| Harold W. Hopp | 1983 | California Superior Court judge for the State of California in Riverside County | |
| George R. Knight | 1965 | Adventist church historian, professor emeritus of church history at Andrews University | |
| Graham Maxwell | 1942 | Theologian and New Testament Studies professor at Loma Linda University | |
| Malcolm Maxwell | 1956 | 19th president of Pacific Union College, 1983–2001 | |
| James Lamar McElhany | 1890s | Former president of the General Conference of Seventh-day Adventists | |
| Alan Nakanishi | 1961 | Former member of the California State Assembly | |
| Francis D. Nichol | 1920 | Apologist and editor of the Adventist Review | |
| Gary Okihiro | 1967 | Professor at Cornell University, Columbia University, and Yale University historian | |
| Stanley G. Payne | 1955 | Professor emeritus at the University of Wisconsin–Madison and historian of modern Spain and European fascism | |
| Jerry Pettis | 1938 | Former member of the United States House of Representatives | |
| Wesley Pomeroy | | Former assistant U.S. attorney general and coordinator for the Law Enforcement Assistance Administration | |
| Ariel A. Roth | 1948 | Chairman of Biology at Andrews University and Loma Linda University and editor of the journal Origins | |
| Derek Sloan | 2007 | Member of Parliament for Hastings—Lennox and Addington, first Seventh-day Adventist to be elected to the Canadian House of Commons | |
| Loree K. Sutton | 1981 | Former U.S. Army brigadier general; founding director of Defense Centers of Excellence for Psychological Health and Traumatic Brain Injury (DCoE); former special assistant to the Assistant Secretary of Defense for Health Affairs | |
| Paul Nobuo Tatsuguchi | 1929 | Surgeon in the Imperial Japanese Army during World War II | |
| Neal C. Wilson | | Former president of the General Conference of Seventh-day Adventists and the North American Division of Seventh-day Adventists | |
| Kenneth H. Wood | 1938 | Former president of the Ellen G. White Estate and member of the General Conference Executive Committee | |
| Justin Wright | 2002 | Animator and storyboard artist at Pixar Animation Studios | |

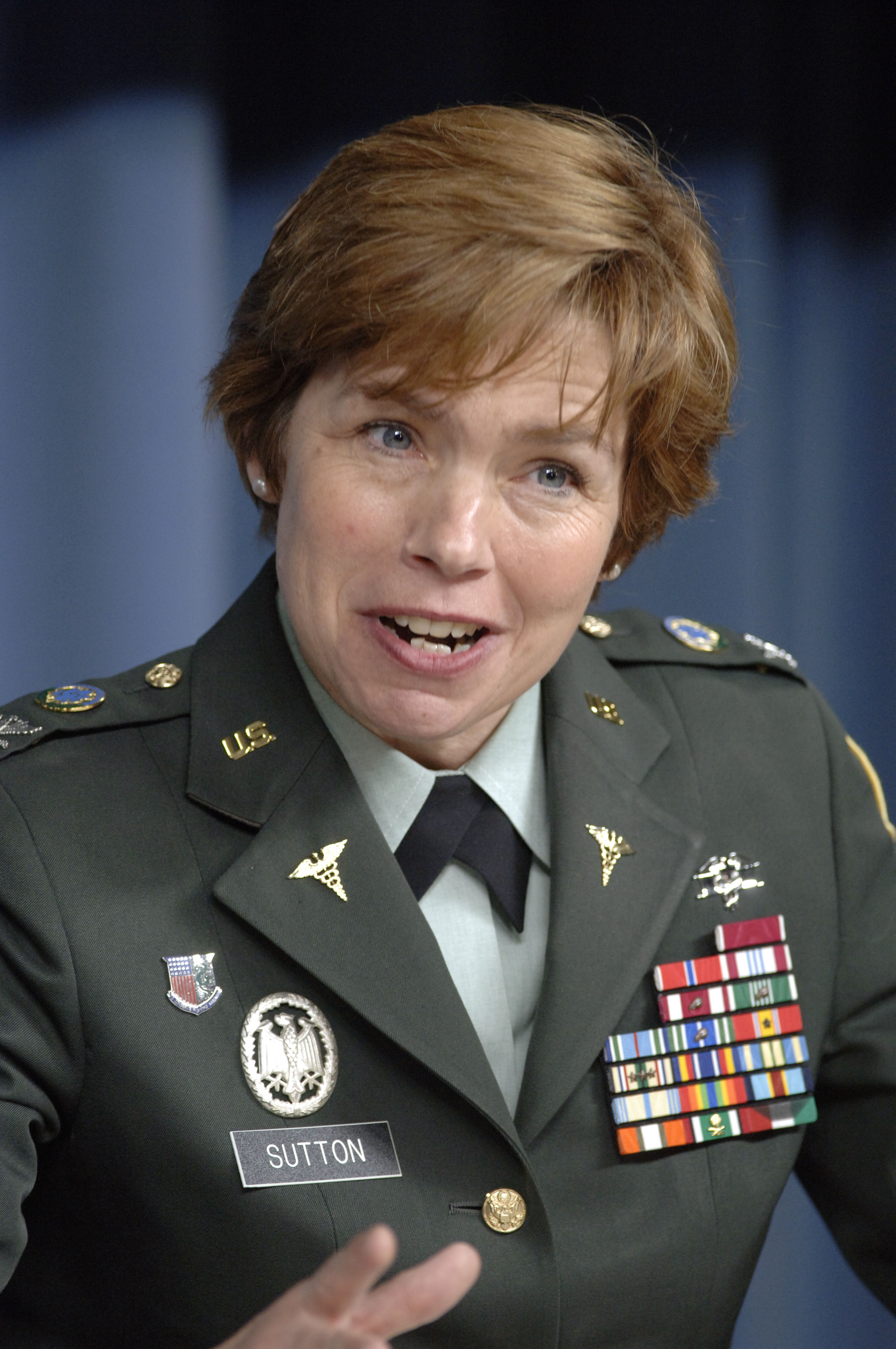
Loree Sutton

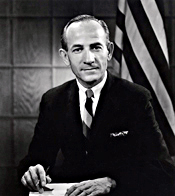
Jerry Pettis

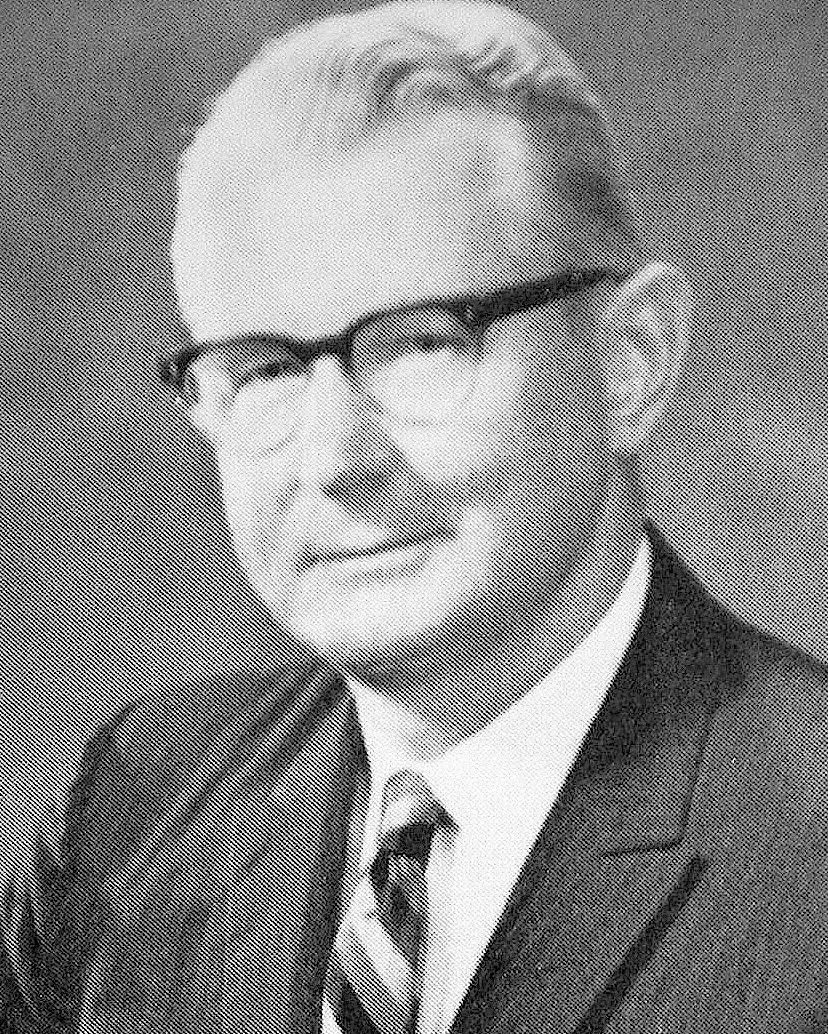
Philip Guthrie Hoffman

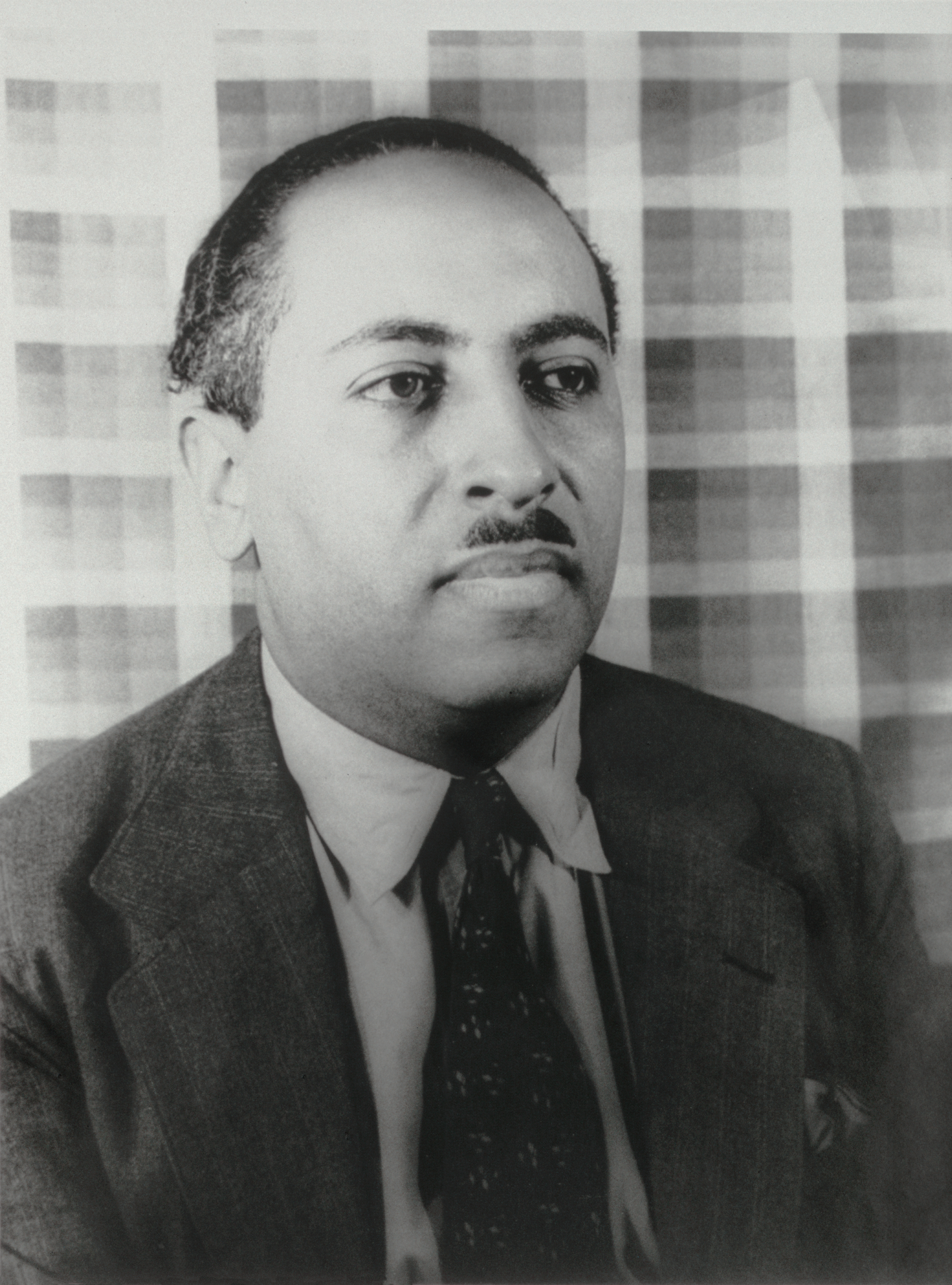
Arna Bontemps

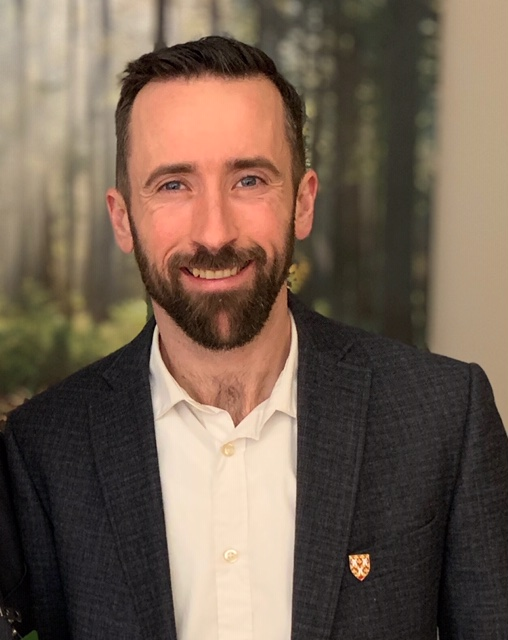
Derek Sloan
