= List of Pi Kappa Lambda chapters =

Pi Kappa Lambda is an international honor society for music that was established at Northwestern University in 1918. It has chartered more than 270 chapters. Following is a list of its chapters, with active chapters indicated in bold and inactive chapters and institutions are in italics.

Chapter	Charter date and range	Institution	Location	Status	Ref.
**Alpha**	1918	Northwestern University	Evanston, Illinois	Active	
**Beta**	1920	University of Nebraska–Lincoln	Lincoln, Nebraska	Active	
Gamma	1921–1994	Knox College	Galesburg, Illinois	Inactive	
**Delta**	1921	University of the Pacific	Stockton, California	Active	
**Epsilon**	1923	Ohio Wesleyan University	Delaware, Ohio	Active	
Zeta	1923–2007	University of Illinois Urbana-Champaign	Urbana, Illinois	Inactive	
**Eta**	1923	University of Southern California	Los Angeles, California	Active	
**Theta**	1926	Oberlin College	Oberlin, Ohio	Active	
**Iota**	1927	New England Conservatory of Music	Boston, Massachusetts	Active	
**Kappa**	1927	University of Kansas	Lawrence, Kansas	Active	
**Lambda**	1927	University of Louisville	Louisville, Kentucky	Active	
**Mu**	1928	Drake University	Des Moines, Iowa	Active	
Nu	1929–1970	Grinnell College	Grinnell, Iowa	Inactive	
**XI**	1935	Rollins College	Winter Park, Florida	Active	
**Omicron**	1936	DePauw University	Greencastle, Indiana	Active	
Pi	1936–1994	University of Cincinnati	Cincinnati, Ohio	Inactive	
**Rho**	1938	Converse University	Spartanburg, South Carolina	Active	
**Sigma**	1938	University of Redlands	Redlands, California	Active	
**Tau**	1940	University of North Carolina at Greensboro	Greensboro, North Carolina	Active	
**Upsilon**	1941	College of Wooster	Wooster, Ohio	Active	
**Phi**	1943	Florida State University	Tallahassee, Florida	Active	
Chi	1945–c. 2024	University of Michigan	Ann Arbor, Michigan	Inactive	
Psi	1948–2007	University of Montevallo	Montevallo, Alabama	Inactive	
Omega	1948–1998	University of Texas at Austin	Austin, Texas	Inactive	
**Alpha Alpha**	1948	University of North Texas	Denton, Texas	Active	
Alpha Beta	1948–2001	Indiana University Bloomington	Bloomington, Indiana	Inactive	
**Alpha Gamma**	1948	Cornell College	Mount Vernon, Iowa	Active	
Alpha Delta	1948–2001	Howard University	Washington, D.C.	Inactive	
Alpha Epsilon	1948–c. 2024	Rhodes College	Memphis, Tennessee	Inactive	
Alpha Zeta	1949–2009	University of Southern Mississippi	Hattiesburg, Mississippi	Inactive	
**Alpha Eta**	1950	Southern Methodist University	Dallas, Texas	Active	
**Alpha Theta**	1951	Lawrence University	Appleton, Wisconsin	Active	
**Alpha Iota**	1955	Ball State University	Muncie, Indiana	Active	
**Alpha Kappa**	1955	Boston University	Boston, Massachusetts	Active	
Alpha Lambda	1955–2008	University of Oklahoma	Norman, Oklahoma	Inactive	
**Alpha Mu**	1956	University of Central Missouri	Warrensburg, Missouri	Active	
**Alpha Nu**	1956	Ithaca College	Ithaca, New York	Active	
Alpha Xi	1957–2006	Willamette University	Salem, Oregon	Inactive	
**Alpha Omicron**	1957	Millikin University	Decatur, Illinois	Active	
**Alpha Pi**	1957	University of Alabama	Tuscaloosa, Alabama	Active	
**Alpha Rho**	1957	Ohio State University	Columbus, Ohio	Active	
Alpha Sigma	1958–2001	University of Minnesota	Minneapolis, Minnesota	Inactive	
Alpha Tau	1958–c. 2024	University of Colorado Boulder	Boulder, Colorado	Inactive	
**Alpha Upsilon**	1960	Oklahoma City University	Oklahoma City, Oklahoma	Active	
**Alpha Phi**	1960	University of Iowa	Iowa City, Iowa	Active	
Alpha Chi	1961–1973	University of New Mexico	Albuquerque, New Mexico	Inactive	
Alpha Psi	1962–2008	University of Missouri–Kansas City	Kansas City, Missouri	Inactive	
**Alpha Omega**	1963	University of Montana	Missoula, Montana	Active	
Beta Alpha	1963–2008	Michigan State University	East Lansing, Michigan	Inactive	
**Beta Beta**	1963	University of Miami	Coral Gables, Florida	Active	
**Beta Gamma**	1963	Stetson University	DeLand, Florida	Active	
**Beta Delta**	1964	St. Olaf College	Northfield, Minnesota	Active	
**Beta Epsilon**	964	University of Idaho	Moscow, Idaho	Active	
**Beta Zeta**	1964	East Carolina University	Greenville, North Carolina	Active	
Beta Eta	1964–1986	University of California, Santa Barbara	Santa Barbara, California	Inactive	
Beta Theta	1964–1999	University of Oregon	Eugene, Oregon	Inactive	
**Beta Iota**	1964	Syracuse University	Syracuse, New York	Active	
Beta Kappa	1965–2004	Walla Walla College	College Place, Washington	Inactive	
**Beta Lambda**	1965	Louisiana State University	Baton Rouge, Louisiana	Active	
Beta Mu	1965–2007	Southern Illinois University Carbondale	Carbondale, Illinois	Inactive	
Beta Nu	1965–1994	University of Tulsa	Tulsa, Oklahoma	Inactive	
Beta Xi	1965–1998	Cleveland Institute of Music	Cleveland, Ohio	Inactive	
**Beta Omicron**	1966	University of Wyoming	Laramie, Wyoming	Active	
**Beta Pi**	1966–1999, 2013	Eastman School of Music	Rochester, New York	Active	
**Beta Rho**	1968	Catholic University of America	Washington, D.C.	Active	
**Beta Sigma**	1968	Western Michigan University	Kalamazoo, Michigan	Active	
**Beta Tau**	1968	University of Georgia	Athens, Georgia	Active	
**Beta Upsilon**	1968	Sam Houston State University	Huntsville, Texas	Active	
**Beta Phi**	1969	Ohio University	Athens, Ohio	Active	
Beta Chi	1969–1999	Brigham Young University	Provo, Utah	Inactive	
**Beta Psi**	1969	University of Tennessee	Knoxville, Tennessee	Active	
**Beta Omega**	1969	California State University, Fullerton	Fullerton, California	Active	
**Gamma Alpha**	1970	Carson–Newman University	Jefferson City, Tennessee	Active	
**Gamma Beta**	1970	Furman University	Greenville, South Carolina	Active	
**Gamma Gamma**	1970	University of Missouri	Columbia, Missouri	Active	
Gamma Delta	1970–1998	University of Kentucky	Lexington, Kentucky	Inactive	
**Gamma Epsilon**	1970	Texas Christian University	Fort Worth, Texas	Active	
Gamma Zeta	1970–2003	University of Florida	Gainesville, Florida	Inactive	
**Gamma Eta**	1970	Appalachian State University	Boone, North Carolina	Active	
**Gamma Theta**	1971	University of South Carolina	Columbia, South Carolina	Active	
Gamma Iota	1970–2008	University of Memphis	Memphis, Tennessee	Inactive	
**Gamma Kappa**	1971	California State University, Northridge	Northridge, Los Angeles, California	Active	
**Gamma Lambda**	1972	Northern State University	Aberdeen, South Dakota	Active	
**Gamma Mu**	1973	Meredith College	Raleigh, North Carolina	Active	
**Gamma Nu**	1973	Iowa State University	Ames, Iowa	Active	
**Gamma Xi**	1973	University of Northern Colorado	Greeley, Colorado	Active	
**Gamma Omicron**	1974	Samford University	Birmingham, Alabama	Active	
**Gamma Pi**	1974	Spelman College	Atlanta, Georgia	Active	
**Gamma Rho**	1974	Miami University	Oxford, Ohio	Active	
**Gamma Sigma**	1974	University of Northern Iowa	Cedar Falls, Iowa	Active	
**Gamma Tau**	1974	Baylor University	Waco, Texas	Active	
**Gamma Upsilon**	1974	Illinois Wesleyan University	Bloomington, Illinois	Active	
**Gamma Phi**	1974	University of Wisconsin–Stevens Point	Stevens Point, Wisconsin	Active	
**Gamma Chi**	1974	Hofstra University	Hempstead, New York	Active	
**Gamma Psi**	1975	Boston Conservatory at Berklee	Boston, Massachusetts	Active	
**Gamma Omega**	1975	Anderson University	Anderson, Indiana	Active	
Delta Alpha	1975–2001	Queens College, City University of New York	Flushing, Queens, New York City, New York	Inactive	
**Delta Beta**	1976	Southern Illinois University Edwardsville	Edwardsville, Illinois	Active	
**Delta Gamma**	1976	Morehead State University	Morehead, Kentucky	Active	
**Delta Delta**	1976	University of Louisiana at Lafayette	Lafayette, Louisiana	Active	
**Delta Epsilon**	1976	Virginia Commonwealth University	Richmond, Virginia	Active	
**Delta Zeta**	1976	Butler University	Indianapolis, Indiana	Active	
Delta Eta	1977–2003	Westminster Choir College	Princeton, New Jersey	Inactive	
**Delta Theta**	1977	University of Wisconsin–Eau Claire	Eau Claire, Wisconsin	Active	
**Delta Iota**	1977	Stephen F. Austin State University	Nacogdoches, Texas	Active	
**Delta Kappa**	1977	Midwestern State University	Wichita Falls, Texas	Active	
**Delta Lambda**	1977	Kansas State University	Manhattan, Kansas	Active	
**Delta Mu**	1977	Indiana State University	Terre Haute, Indiana	Active	
Delta Nu	1977–2001	Eastern New Mexico University	Portales, New Mexico	Inactive	
**Delta Xi**	1977	California State University, Sacramento	Sacramento, California	Active	
**Delta Omicron**	1977	Bowling Green State University	Bowling Green, Ohio	Active	
**Delta Pi**	1978	University of Maryland, College Park	College Park, Maryland	Active	
**Delta Rho**	1978	Rowan University	Glassboro, New Jersey	Active	
**Delta Sigma**	1978	West Chester University	West Chester, Pennsylvania	Active	
**Delta Tau**	1978	Cleveland State University	Cleveland, Ohio	Active	
**Delta Upsilon**	1979	University of Evansville	Evansville, Indiana	Active	
**Delta Phi**	1979–1991, c. 2024	Washington State University	Pullman, Washington	Active	
Delta Chi	1980–2012	Kent State University	Kent, Ohio	Inactive	
**Delta Psi**	1980	Immaculata University	Immaculata, Pennsylvania	Active	
**Delta Omega**	1980	State University of New York at Fredonia	Fredonia, New York	Active	
Epsilon Alpha	1981–May 2024	Birmingham–Southern College	Birmingham, Alabama	Inactive	(Note: The chapter went inactive when the college closed May 2024.)
**Epsilon Beta**	April 25, 1981	Shorter University	Rome, Georgia	Active	
**Epsilon Gamma**	1981	University of Hartford	West Hartford, Connecticut	Active	
**Epsilon Delta**	1981	Ouachita Baptist University	Arkadelphia, Arkansas	Active	
**Epsilon Epsilon**	1981	Augustana College	Rock Island, Illinois	Active	
Epsilon Zeta	1982–1998	Alabama State University	Montgomery, Alabama	Inactive	
**Epsilon Eta**	1982	Belmont University	Nashville, Tennessee	Active	
Epsilon Theta	1982–1990	West Virginia University	Morgantown, West Virginia	Inactive	
**Epsilon Iota**	1982	Minnesota State University Moorhead	Moorhead, Minnesota	Active	
Epsilon Kappa	1982–2001	Andrews University	Berrien Springs, Michigan	Inactive	
**Epsilon Lambda**	1983	Wayne State University	Detroit, Michigan	Active	
**Epsilon Mu**	1983	Albion College	Albion, Michigan	Active	
Epsilon Nu	1983–2003	University of Wisconsin–Madison	Madison, Wisconsin	Inactive	
**Epsilon Xi**	1983	California State University, Long Beach	Long Beach, California	Active	
**Epsilon Omicron**	1983	Peabody Institute	Baltimore, Maryland	Active	
**Epsilon Pi**	1984	Hardin–Simmons University	Abilene, Texas	Active	
**Epsilon Rho**	1984	Jacksonville University	Jacksonville, Florida	Active	
**Epsilon Sigma**	1984	University of Arkansas	Fayetteville, Arkansas	Active	
**Epsilon Tau**	1984	Texas State University	San Marcos, Texas	Active	
Epsilon Upsilon	1984–2009	University of Hawaiʻi at Mānoa	Honolulu, Hawaii	Inactive	
Epsilon Phi	1984–2003	New York University	New York City, New York	Inactive	
**Epsilon Chi**	1985–2003, 2024	Illinois State University	Normal, Illinois	Active	
**Epsilon Psi**	1985	Evangel University	Springfield, Missouri	Active	
**Epsilon Omega**	1985	Luther College	Decorah, Iowa	Active	
**Zeta Alpha**	1986	University of Texas at El Paso	El Paso, Texas	Active	
**Zeta Beta**	1986	Missouri State University	Springfield, Missouri	Active	
Zeta Gamma	1986–2012	Northern Illinois University	DeKalb, Illinois	Inactive	
Zeta Delta	1987–c. 2024	Hope College	Holland, Michigan	Inactive	
**Zeta Epsilon**	1987	Marywood University	Scranton, Pennsylvania	Active	
**Zeta Zeta**	1987	Southwest Baptist University	Bolivar, Missouri	Active	
Zeta Eta	1987–1999	DePaul University	Chicago, Illinois	Inactive	
**Zeta Theta**	1988	Duquesne University	Pittsburgh, Pennsylvania	Active	
**Zeta Iota**	1988	Pennsylvania State University	University Park, Pennsylvania	Active	
Zeta Kappa	1988–2003	Arkansas State University	State University, Arkansas	Inactive	
**Zeta Lambda**	1988	Capital University	Bexley, Ohio	Active	
**Zeta Mu**	1988	State University of New York at Potsdam	Potsdam, New York	Active	
**Zeta Nu**	1988	Colorado State University	Fort Collins, Colorado	Active	
**Zeta Xi**	1988	Tennessee Tech	Cookeville, Tennessee	Active	
**Zeta Omicron**	1988	Houghton University	Houghton, New York	Active	
**Zeta Pi**	1989	Oklahoma Baptist University	Shawnee, Oklahoma	Active	
**Zeta Rho**	1989	Delta State University	Cleveland, Mississippi	Active	
**Zeta Sigma**	1989	University of Maine	Orono, Maine	Active	
**Zeta Tau**	1989	University of Houston	Houston, Texas	Active	
**Zeta Upsilon**	1989	University of Rhode Island	Kingston, Rhode Island	Active	
Zeta Phi	1989–2007	University of Connecticut	Storrs, Connecticut	Inactive	
**Zeta Chi**	1990	Gustavus Adolphus College	St. Peter, Minnesota	Active	
Zeta Psi	1989–2003	University at Buffalo	Buffalo, New York	Inactive	
Zeta Omega	1990–2003	Arizona State University	Tempe, Arizona	Inactive	
**Eta Alpha**	1990	West Texas A&M University	Canyon, Texas	Active	
Eta Beta	1990–2007	Rutgers University–New Brunswick	New Brunswick, New Jersey	Inactive	
**Eta Gamma**	1990	Auburn University	Auburn, Alabama	Active	
**Eta Delta**	1990	Valparaiso University	Valparaiso, Indiana	Active	
Eta Epsilon	1991–2001	Georgia State University	Atlanta, Georgia	Inactive	
**Eta Zeta**	1991	University of Central Florida	Orlando, Florida	Active	
**Eta Eta**	1991	Temple University	Philadelphia, Pennsylvania	Active	
**Eta Theta**	1991	San Diego State University	San Diego, California	Active	
**Eta Iota**	1992	Vanderbilt University	Nashville, Tennessee	Active	
Eta Kappa	1992–c. 2024	Columbus State University	Columbus, Georgia	Inactive	
**Eta Lambda**	1992	University of South Florida	Tampa, Florida	Active	
**Eta Mu**	1992	Missouri Western State University	St. Joseph, Missouri	Active	
**Eta Nu**	1992	University of Mississippi	University, Mississippi	Active	
Eta Xi	1992–2023	Central Washington University	Ellensburg, Washington	Inactive	
**Eta Omicron**	1993	Winthrop University	Rock Hill, South Carolina	Active	
**Eta Pi**	1993	Trinity University	San Antonio, Texas	Active	
**Eta Rho**	1993	Hartwick College	Oneonta, New York	Active	
**Eta Sigma**	1994	Truman State University	Kirksville, Missouri	Active	
**Eta Tau**	1994	Southwestern University	Georgetown, Texas	Active	
**Eta Upsilon**	1994	Old Dominion University	Norfolk, Virginia	Active	
Eta Phi	1994–2010	Northern Kentucky University	Highland Heights, Kentucky	Inactive	
**Eta Chi**	1994	University of Delaware	Newark, Delaware	Active	
**Eta Psi**	1994	University of Denver	Denver, Colorado	Active	
Eta Omega	1995–2010	South Carolina State University	Orangeburg, South Carolina	Inactive	
**Theta Alpha**	1995	East Tennessee State University	Johnson City, Tennessee	Active	
**Theta Beta**	1995	Austin Peay State University	Clarksville, Tennessee	Active	
**Theta Gamma**	1995	Pittsburg State University	Pittsburg, Kansas	Active	
**Theta Delta**	1995	University of Texas at San Antonio	San Antonio, Texas	Active	
Theta Epsilon	1995–2004	Minnesota State University, Mankato	Mankato, Minnesota	Inactive	
**Theta Zeta**	1995	Pacific Union College	Angwin, California	Active	
**Theta Eta**	1996	Western Kentucky University	Bowling Green, Kentucky	Active	
**Theta Theta**	1996	University of North Alabama	Florence, Alabama	Active	
**Theta Iota**	1996	Union University	Jackson, Tennessee	Active	
**Theta Kappa**	1997	Texas Tech University	Lubbock, Texas	Active	
**Theta Lambda**	1997	Nazareth University	Rochester, New York	Active	
**Theta Mu**	1997	Radford University	Radford, Virginia	Active	
**Theta Nu**	1997	Adams State University	Alamosa, Colorado	Active	
**Theta Xi**	1997	Carnegie Mellon University	Pittsburgh, Pennsylvania	Active	
**Theta Omicron**	1997	University of Mount Union	Alliance, Ohio	Active	
Theta Pi	1997–c. 2024	Wichita State University	Wichita, Kansas	Inactive	
Theta Rho	1998–2010	Roberts Wesleyan University	Rochester, New York	Inactive	
**Theta Sigma**	1998	Cameron University	Lawton, Oklahoma	Active	
**Theta Tau**	1998	Kennesaw State University	Kennesaw, Georgia	Active	
**Theta Upsilon**	1999	University of South Dakota	Vermillion, South Dakota	Active	
**Theta Phi**	1999	Coe College	Cedar Rapids, Iowa	Active	
**Theta Chi**	2000	University of Akron	Akron, Ohio	Active	
Theta Psi	2000–c. 2024	Angelo State University	San Angelo, Texas	Inactive	
Theta Omega	2000–2010	University of Massachusetts Lowell	Lowell, Massachusetts	Inactive	
**Iota Alpha**	2000	University of Arkansas at Monticello	Monticello, Arkansas	Active	
Iota Beta	2000–2004	George Mason University	Fairfax, Virginia	Inactive	
**Iota Gamma**	2000	State University of New York at Oswego	Oswego, New York	Active	
Iota Delta	2000–2007	Southeast Missouri State University	Cape Girardeau, Missouri	Inactive	
**Iota Epsilon**	2001	Lee University	Cleveland, Tennessee	Active	
Iota Zeta	2001–c. 2024	University of Texas at Arlington	Arlington, Texas	Inactive	
**Iota Eta**	2001	James Madison University	Harrisonburg, Virginia	Active	
**Iota Theta**	2002	The College of New Jersey	Ewing Township, New Jersey	Active	
**Iota Iota**	2002–2012, c. 2023	Berry College	Mount Berry, Georgia	Active	
**Iota Kappa**	2003	University of North Dakota	Grand Forks, North Dakota	Active	
**Iota Lambda**	2003	Valdosta State University	Valdosta, Georgia	Active	
**Iota Mu**	2004	Christopher Newport University	Newport News, Virginia	Active	
**Iota Nu**	2004	Concordia University Nebraska	Seward, Nebraska	Active	
**Iota Xi**	2005	Lamar University	Beaumont, Texas	Active	
**Iota Omicron**	2005	Pepperdine University	Malibu, California	Active	
**Iota Pi**	2005	Georgia Southern University	Statesboro, Georgia	Active	
**Iota Rho**	2005	Central Michigan University	Mount Pleasant, Michigan	Active	
**Iota Sigma**	2005	Campbellsville University	Campbellsville, Kentucky	Active	
**Iota Tau**	2005	University of Central Oklahoma	Edmond, Oklahoma	Active	
Iota Upsilon	2006–2011	Indiana University–Purdue University Fort Wayne	Fort Wayne, Indiana	Inactive	
**Iota Phi**	2006	Middle Tennessee State University	Murfreesboro, Tennessee	Active	
Iota Chi	2007–c. 2024	Jacksonville State University	Jacksonville, Alabama	Inactive	
**Iota Psi**	2007	Salem College	Winston-Salem, North Carolina	Active	
**Iota Omega**	2007	Morehouse College	Atlanta, Georgia	Active	
Kappa Alpha	2008–c. 2024	University of South Alabama	Mobile, Alabama	Inactive	
**Kappa Beta**	2008	Western Carolina University	Cullowhee, North Carolina	Active	
**Kappa Gamma**	2008	Brevard College	Brevard, North Carolina	Active	
**Kappa Delta**	2010	Colorado Christian University	Lakewood, Colorado	Active	
**Kappa Epsilon**	2009	Pennsylvania Western University, Edinboro	Edinboro, Pennsylvania	Active	
**Kappa Zeta**	2009	Reinhardt University	Waleska, Georgia	Active	
**Kappa Eta**	2009	North Greenville University	Tigerville, South Carolina	Active	
**Kappa Theta**	2011	Metropolitan State University of Denver	Denver, Colorado	Active	
**Kappa Iota**	2011	Claflin University	Orangeburg, South Carolina	Active	
**Kappa Kappa**	2012	St. Norbert College	De Pere, Wisconsin	Active	
**Kappa Lambda**	2012	Glenville State University	Glenville, West Virginia	Active	
**Kappa Mu**	2012	Olivet Nazarene University	Bourbonnais, Illinois	Active	
**Kappa Nu**	2013	Molloy University	Rockville Centre, New York	Active	
**Kappa Xi**	2013	Nelson University	Waxahachie, Texas	Active	(Note: Chapter was established at Southwestern Assemblies of God University, which became Nelson University in 2024.)
**Kappa Omicron**	2013	Texas Woman's University	Denton, Texas	Active	
**Kappa Pi**	2014	Keene State College	Keene, New Hampshire	Active	
**Kappa Rho**	2014	Charleston Southern University	North Charleston, South Carolina	Active	
**Kappa Sigma**	2014	Concordia College	Moorhead, Minnesota	Active	
**Kappa Tau**	2015	Palm Beach Atlantic University	West Palm Beach, Florida	Active	
**Kappa Upsilon**	2016	Gardner–Webb University	Boiling Springs, North Carolina	Active	
**Kappa Phi**	2016	Westmont College	Montecito, California	Active	
**Kappa Chi**	2016	Florida Southern College	Lakeland, Florida	Active	
**Kappa Psi**	2017	North Carolina Central University	Durham, North Carolina	Active	
**Kappa Omega**	2017	Trevecca Nazarene University	Nashville, Tennessee	Active	
**Lambda Alpha**	2017	Dallas Baptist University	Dallas, Texas	Active	
**Lambda Beta**	2018	University of Texas Permian Basin	Odessa, Texas	Active	
**Lambda Gamma**	2019	Bethune–Cookman University	Daytona Beach, Florida	Active	
**Lambda Delta**	2019	Tennessee State University	Nashville, Tennessee	Active	
**Lambda Epsilon**	2021	Washington & Jefferson College	Washington, Pennsylvania	Active	
**Lambda Zeta**	2022	Louisiana Tech University	Ruston, Louisiana	Active	
**Lambda Eta**	2023	Chowan University	Murfreesboro, North Carolina	Active	
**Lambda Theta**	2023	Alcorn State University	Lorman, Mississippi		
