= Pacific Union College Church =

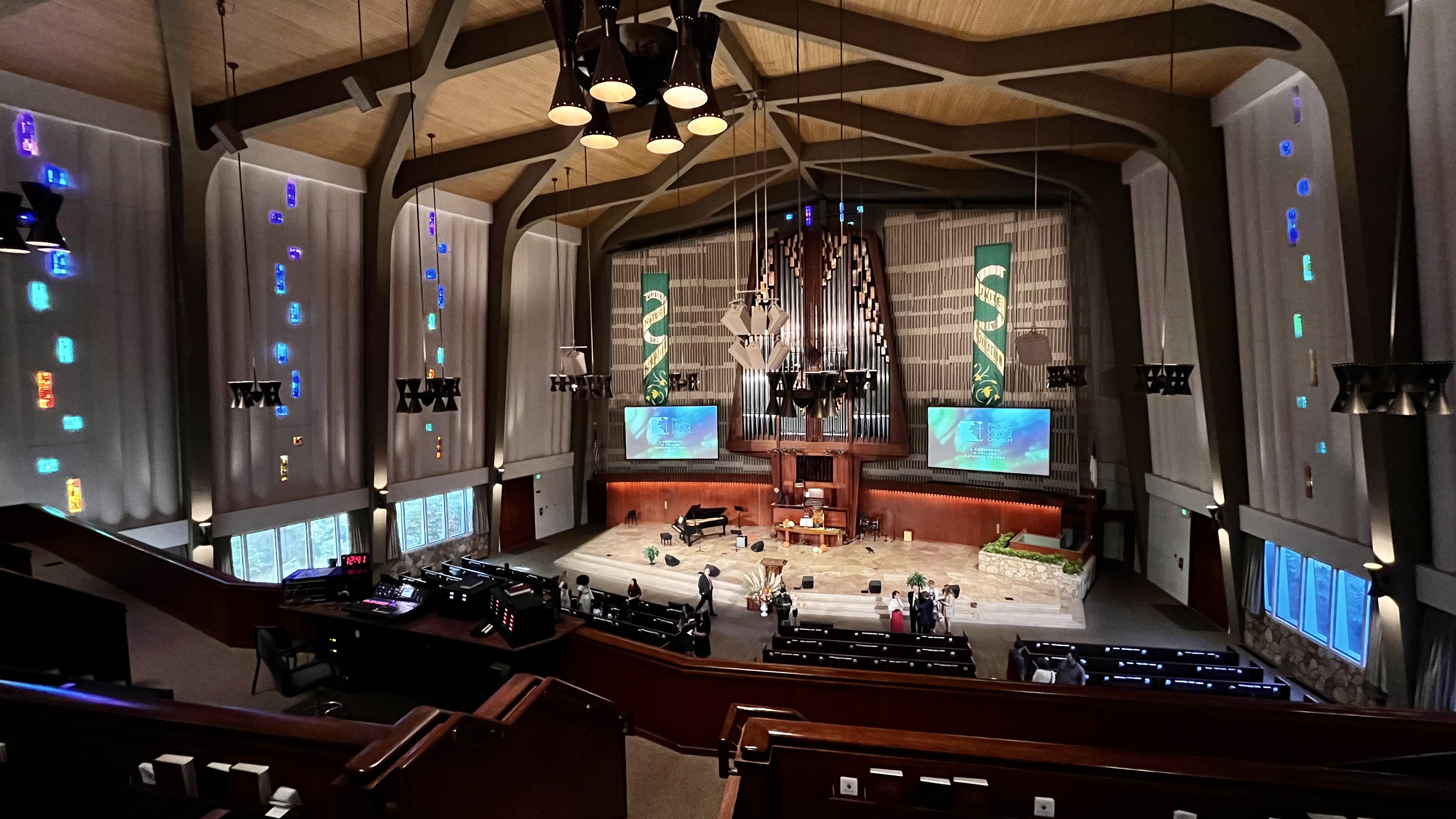
- Pacific Union College Church
- 38.57024°N 122.44164°W
- Location: Pacific Union College; Angwin, California
- Country: United States
- Denomination: Seventh-day Adventist Church
- Website: www.pucchurch.org

History
- Founded: December 31, 1909

Clergy
- Pastor(s): Ernest Furness, Jim Wibberding, John Hughson

The Pacific Union College Church (PUC Church) is the campus church of Pacific Union College in Angwin, Napa Valley, California. It is a part of the worldwide Seventh-day Adventist Church.

== History ==
The congregation first met in 1909 in a former dance hall shortly after the college moved from Healdsburg to Angwin. It records having 42 charter members at that time. In 1919, the congregation met in the chapel of the new college building, and by 1921 it counted 290 members. Until 1947, the pastor was the head of the college's theology department. The congregation moved into its own new building in 1968. Like most churches of the time, its practices were traditional in form with weekly performances by its church choir. By 1984, the church plant was worth an estimated $7.7 million due to inflation; it had cost less than a third of that amount to construct in 1968. While the college originally funded all levels of its education, starting in 1901, it took over the financial responsibility for the elementary school. They raised a church-school fund. All the children of the church were free to attend the school.

In 2000, PUC Church was noted for being the only church in the Northern California Conference of Seventh-day Adventists to have a female pastor. Pastors from the church have been featured at various events hosted by Adventist Churches. The church is active in philanthropy, as well. In 2010 the church raised over $25,000 to aid in relief efforts after the 2010 Haiti earthquake. The church has 1,620 members as of October 2022, and is regularly frequented by students attending the college as well.

== Rieger Pipe Organ ==
The PUC Church contains a pipe organ designed by Austrian organ builder Rieger Orgelbau. The organ rises 50 feet (15 m) above the front stage of the sanctuary, and its 4,000 pipes range in size from two inches to 20 feet. During planning, designers were concerned about the tendency of the organ to make the balcony shake, leading them to place it at the front of the church. The organ is distinguished by its significant French influences, departing from Rieger's previous work based on Germanic sympathies; it was influenced by organs built by Frenchmen Dom Bédos de Celles, Aristide Cavaillé-Coll, François-Henri Clicquot and Robert Clicquot. When installation was completed in 1981, it was the largest organ that Rieger's company had constructed. In 1996, a group of German organists listed the organ as one of the top 35 most important organs in the United States.

== Notable members ==
- Desmond Ford
- Richard Osborn
- Heather Knight
- Morris Venden

== See also ==
- Adventist beliefs
- Adventist theology
