= Richard Osborn =

American academic administrator

Richard Charles Osborn
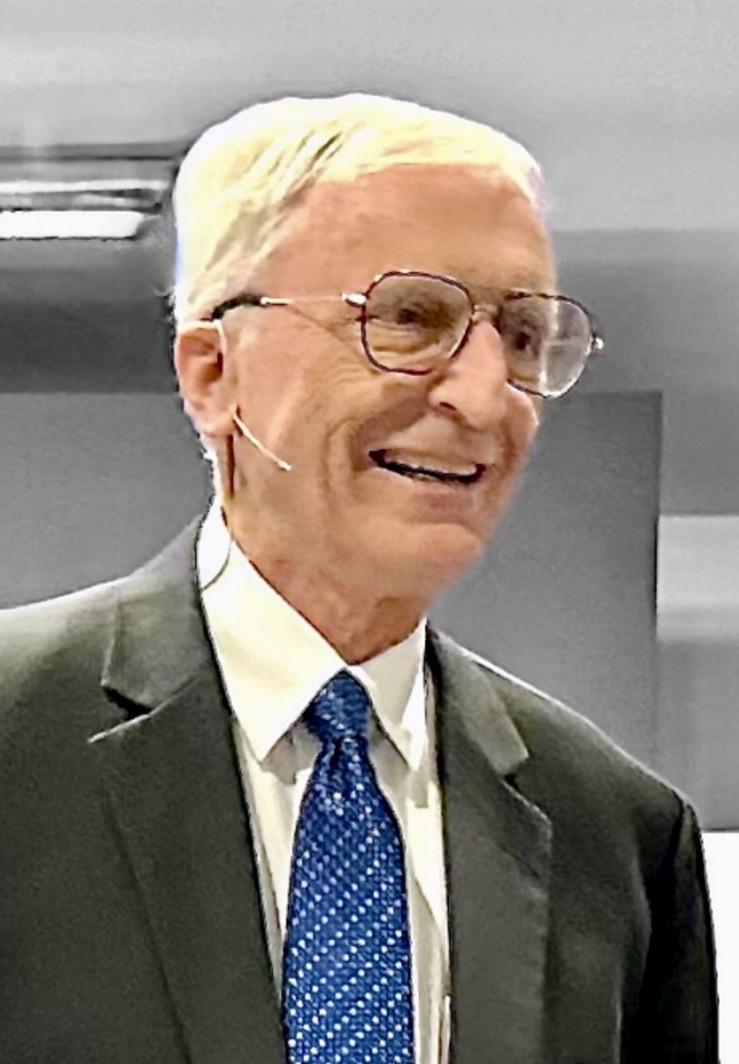

20th President of Pacific Union College
- In office 2001–2009
- Preceded by: Malcolm Maxwell
- Succeeded by: Heather Knight

Personal details
- Born: March 19, 1947 (age 79) Loma Linda, CA
- Spouse: Norma Keough
- Children: 2
- Parent(s): Robert Osborn and Evelyn Lawson
- Education: Washington Adventist University (BA); University of Maryland (MA, PhD)
- Profession: College administrator Educator

Richard Charles Osborn is a retired administrator of American higher education, who served as vice-president of WSCUC at the time of his retirement in 2019.

== Life and Education ==
Richard Osborn was born 19 Mar 1947 in Loma Linda, CA, as the first of two children to Robert Osborn and Evelyn Lawson. He is married to the former Norma Keough, a retired pastor and former elementary school teacher. They have 2 children, a daughter and a son, and 5 grandchildren.

He received a BA degree in history from Columbia Union College (now Washington Adventist University) in 1969, and an MA (1975) and PhD (1990) in the colonial history of Virginia from the University of Maryland. His dissertation was titled: "William Preston of Virginia, 1727-1783: The Making of a Frontier Elite."

== Professional career ==
Osborn's career consisted of 50 years in K-12 and higher education. He served as principal of Takoma Academy (1980–1987), a Seventh-day Adventist secondary school in Takoma Park, MD, as vice-president for education for the Columbia Union Conference (1988–1995), an Adventist regional administration entity, and as vice-president for education of the North American Division of Seventh-day Adventists (1996–2001).

He was the 20th president of Pacific Union College (2001–2009), an Adventist post-secondary school in Angwin, CA. At the time of his retirement in 2019, Osborn was vice-president of the WASC Senior College and University Commission (WSCUC). In 2023, he left retirement to accept a one-year appointment as interim president of La Sierra University.

He continues to serve as a trustee of several institutions, including Loma Linda University Health, Loma Linda, CA.

During his career, Osborn served in various roles related to higher education, including:

- Chair, Association of Independent California Colleges & Universities (AICCU).
- Member of the Secretariat, National Association of Independent Colleges and Universities (NAICU).
- President, treasurer, and board chair, Council for American Private Education (CAPE).
- Founding president, Association of Adventist Colleges and Universities (AACU).
- Commissioner, Commission on Osteopathic College Accreditation (COCA).

Among his many publications are the following scholarly articles:

- "Taking a Systems Approach to Adventist Education," The Journal of Adventist Education (Summer 2000).
- "William Preston: Origins of a Backcountry Political Career," Journal of Backcountry Studies (UNCG) 2.2 (Fall 2007).
- "William Preston and the American Revolution," Journal of Backcountry Studies (UNCG) 3.1 (Spring 2008).
- "William Preston and the Revolutionary Settlement," Journal of Backcountry Studies (UNCG) 3.2 (Fall 2008).
- "William Preston—Revolutionary (1779-1781)," The Smithfield Review (2008 & 2009).
