= Heather Knight (educator) =

American educator

Heather Joy Knight

21st President of Pacific Union College
- Incumbent
- Assumed office September 15, 2009
- Preceded by: Richard Osborn

1st Provost of Andrews University
- In office 2006–2009
- Succeeded by: Andrea Luxton

Personal details
- Born: Jamaica
- Spouse: Norman Knight
- Education: Oakwood University; Loma Linda University; Stanford University; Harvard University
- Profession: Professor; College administrator

Heather Joy Knight is an American educator and former President of Pacific Union College. She is the first woman to serve in that role and the only African-American woman to lead a college affiliated with the Adventist Church in North America. Born in Jamaica, her family moved to the United States when she was nine. After completing her undergraduate degree at Oakwood College, she did her graduate work at Loma Linda University. She received her doctorate at Stanford University and pursued postdoctoral research at Harvard University.

She began her career on the faculty of the University of the Pacific, becoming an award-winning associate provost until she was asked to take over as provost at Andrews University. In 2009, she became the 21st President of Pacific Union College.

== Early life and education ==
Heather Joy Knight was born in Jamaica and lived there for the first nine years of her life. She immigrated to the United States, settling in the Bronx, New York, with her parents Austin and Herolin Evelyn. Knight is married to professor and outreach chaplain, Norman Knight. They have five sons and three daughters.

Knight began her formal education while in Jamaica under the British system. After her family moved to the Bronx, New York, she attended the Fiorello H. LaGuardia High School, featured in the 1980 Academy Award winning movie Fame and the 1982 TV series, majoring in vocal performance.

Knight began her undergraduate education at Howard University in Washington, DC but transferred a year later to Oakwood University, then known as Oakwood College, in Huntsville, Alabama where she graduated in 1982 with a bachelor's degree in English. Two years later, she got her master's degree in English from Loma Linda University in Loma Linda, California. In 1991, she received her doctorate, also in English, from Stanford University in Palo Alto, California. She completed postdoctoral studies in management and leadership in education at Harvard University in Cambridge, Massachusetts.

== Career ==
=== University of the Pacific ===
Knight began her career at the University of the Pacific in Stockton, California as a professor of English in 1988. She later became the assistant provost and then in 1997, the associate provost for Faculty Development, Diversity and Special Programs. During her time at the University of the Pacific, she is credited with leading the school's first Diversity Committee as well as spearheading a major initiative that is credited with nearly doubling the number of minority faculty at the University of the Pacific. In 1997, Knight became the youngest faculty member to receive the University of the Pacific's distinguished Eberhardt Teacher/Scholar Award for exemplary teaching and scholarship.

=== Andrews University ===
In 2006, Knight was appointed provost of Andrews University in Berrien Springs, Michigan. Her work there involved oversight of Andrews various operations and academic enterprises. Knight was responsible for overseeing over 150 academic programs, 227 full-time faculty, 3,400 students studying on the Berrien Springs campus, as well as another 4,000 students studying in Affiliation and Extension programs around the world, and a $75 million budget.

=== Pacific Union College ===
Knight was selected as President of Pacific Union College in July 2009 and took office in September 2009. She was officially inaugurated on April 15, 2010, in a ceremony at the Pacific Union College Church. Her selection was historical, in that she is both the first black president and first female president in Pacific Union College history. Furthermore, she is the first (and currently only) black woman to lead a North American Adventist college. When Knight took over, Pacific Union College had experienced two consecutive years of decline in enrollment, however, in her first year as president enrollment increased by 11%. After taking over at Pacific Union College, Knight has been noted for her wide experience at both Christian and secular schools and her ability to build consensus between various constituent parties. In December 2010, Knight received an award from the local Chamber of Commerce recognizing her attentiveness to and willingness to work with the community. Knight completed her presidency at PUC on January 8, 2017.

== Educational philosophy ==
=== The Adventist Advantage ===
In the second all-school colloquy of the 2009–2010 school year at Pacific Union College, Knight spoke on "Integrating Faith and Learning: A Higher Education Imperative" and her Adventist Advantage platform. She reported that institutions of higher learning are taking a fresh look at religion and spirituality and argued that it provides Adventist Education "with multiple opportunities to showcase what we have been doing so very well for so many years." She introduced her theoretical framework to meet these opportunities, titled the Adventist Advantage.

=== From Good to Great ===
Heather Knight studied Stanford colleague Jim Collins' concepts outlined in his book Good to Great. Knight uses the 'good to great' idea as a theoretical framework for institutional improvement. Knight asserts that, "We are called to a really high level of excellence based on the exceeding excellence of God Himself. Therefore, we have an important role to play as pacesetters and models of best practices in higher education." The January, 2011 edition of the Pacific Union Recorder reports on renovations to the campus accomplished under Knight's leadership. Pacific Union College's dining commons and campus center, a major hub of student life, had not been updated in 30 years. The Recorder quotes Knight, "When I think about our campus going from good to great, I'm including every area of campus, including our facilities. My vision is that within the next several years the entire campus will be transformed."

=== Statement on Faith and Reason ===
In late 2010, a biology professor at Pacific Union College was falsely accused of promoting theistic evolution, contrary to official church belief. This followed the controversy over the teaching of origins at La Sierra University over similar accusations. As president, Knight was quoted in a statement affirming Pacific Union College's commitment to church beliefs while emphasizing the school's dedication "to understanding contemporary issues surrounding science that sometimes conflict with specific theology."
