= List of presidents of Pacific Union College =

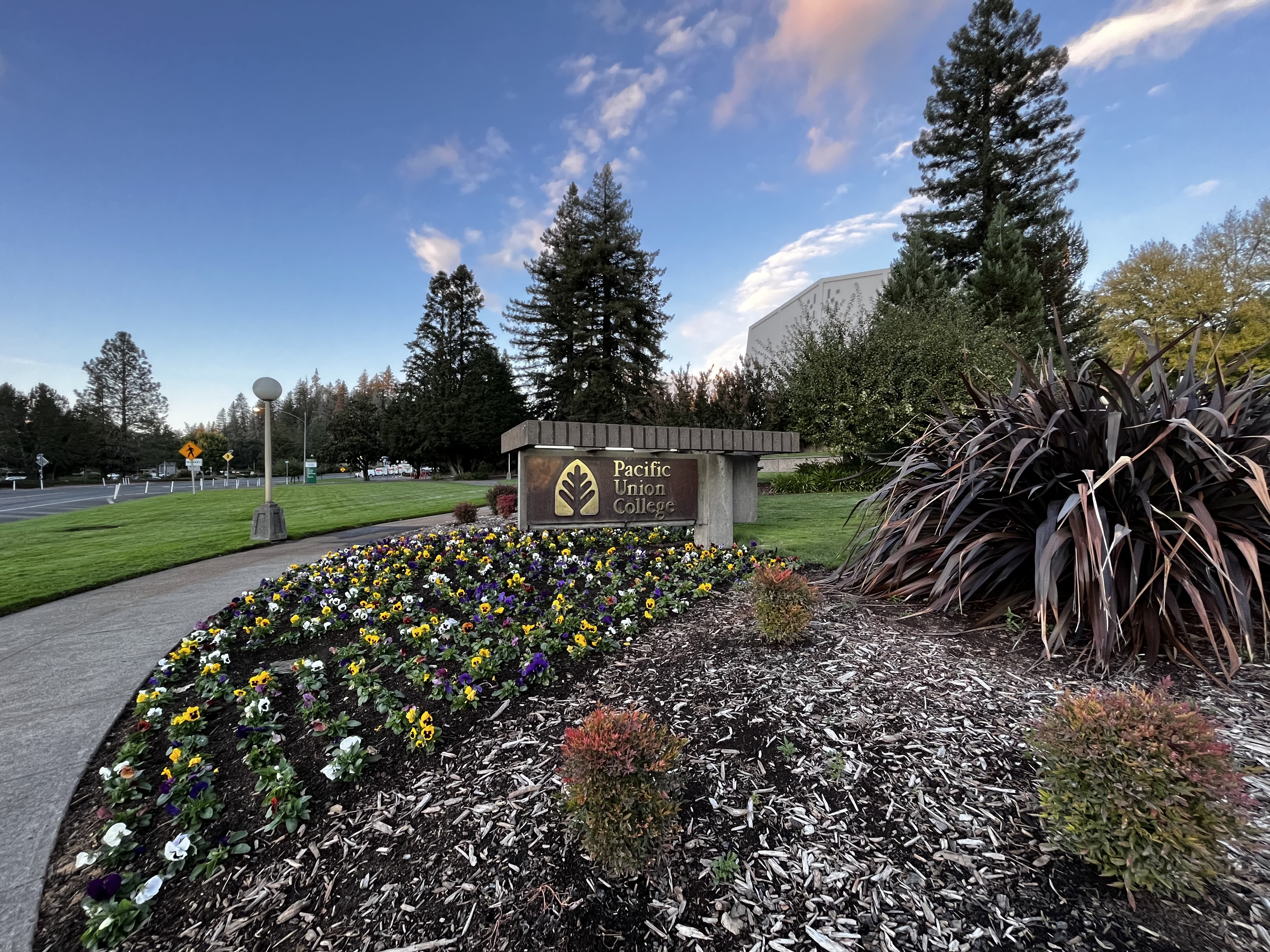
Sign near the entrance to Pacific Union College

This is a list of people who have served as the president of Pacific Union College (PUC), a private liberal arts college in California's Napa Valley. Twenty-four individuals have done so since the college's its founding in 1882 as Healdsburg Academy.

The first eight presidents led the school while it was still located in Healdsburg. The last of these was Lucas Reed, whose tenure ended in 1908, one year before the school moved to Angwin.

Charles Walter Irwin became the first person to be selected as president of Pacific Union College on its Angwin campus, where the college moved in 1909. Irwin led the school at its new location for thirteen years.

The president who has served the longest tenure to date is Malcolm Maxwell, who served eighteen years. He was also the first alumnus of Pacific Union College to be selected as its president, and the fourth president to have come to PUC from Walla Walla University.

== List of presidents ==
Term	President	Biographical and background information
I; 1882–1886	Sidney Brownsberger	Sidney Brownsberger was the first president of Pacific Union College, then on its former campus in Healdsburg, California and known as Healdsburg Academy. Prior to founding Healdsburg Academy, he was the president of Battle Creek Adventist College from 1875 to 1881, after finding his faith in the church in Battle Creek, Michigan. While he attended the University of Michigan, the school had a policy that students were expected to worship at any local church on Saturday. Brownsberger found himself at a Methodist church which left him feeling that the particular church was "very formal and uninviting to a soul hungering for truth and spiritual enlightenment". As he expressed these feelings to his roommate, he was told that there was a church in Battle Creek that "Lived some Christian people" and kept the "Bible Sabbath". Brownsberger found a fulfilling truth at the Battle Creek church which inspired him to start the first Seventh-Day Adventist College. While teaching at Healdsburg Academy, he was known for his emphasis on practical education and Christian service.
II; 1886–1894	William Grainger	William C. Grainger, the second president of Pacific Union College, still known then as Healdsburg College, was a transplant from Missouri to California. When he took over Healdsburg in 1886, the school had 223 students and thirteen teachers. His twelve-year presidency was noted for the close relationship he cultivated with the school's constituency and between students and teachers. He resigned the presidency of Healdsburg College in 1884 in order to move to Japan.
III; 1894–1897	Frank Howe	Frank Howe was the third president of Pacific Union College, still Healdsburg College. A graduate of the University of Michigan, he was sent to the school by Adventist leadership along with two associates in order to bring Healdsburg closer to denominational ideals. During his presidency, enrollment at Heraldsburg dropped from the earlier high of 223 to 130. Howe limited access to the president while implementing arcane rules, bringing opposition from both within the school and community. At the end of the 1897 school year, the faculty scattered and a bitter Howe resigned.
IV; 1897–1899		Rodrick Sterling Owen was the fourth president of Healdsburg College, as Pacific Union College was known at the time. A lawyer, before assuming the presidency he served as a "highly respected" faculty member in the school's theology department. During his short tenure, he built up faculty morale that had been lowered during Howe's presidency. In 1899, Owen left Healdsburg College to assume new responsibilities at the College of Medical Evangelists, now known as Loma Linda University.
V; 1899–1903		Marion E. Cady became the school's fifth president in 1899, leading to what the school refers to as its "second 'great' period." During his presidency, the school's enrollment increased to a record 298 students and had 29 faculty members. Cady implemented a quarter-based calendar for the school, organized the school by departments, and started the Timberland Academy off the main campus, leading to his reputation as an likable, aggressive and eloquent leader.
VI; 1903–1904		Elton D. Sharpe was asked to assume the presidency of Healdsburg College for one year after Marion Cady's departure. He had previously served as vice president of the school. His short administration is remembered for its attention to the school's most pressing needs, many financial. After a year he left to take a position with another institution. In 1906, he returned to Healdsburg College, then renamed Pacific Union College, as a faculty member in the theology department.
VII; 1904–1906		Warren E. Howell came to Healdsburg from Emmanuel Missionary College, now Andrews University, in Michigan. At the time of his appointment, his foremost task was to restore the school to sound financial footing. While president, he simultaneously worked as the business manager and dean of men at the school. His efforts notwithstanding, he was unable to stabilize the school's financial situation while enrollment declined. After being dismissed from the presidency in 1906, he was named the first president of the Loma Linda College of Evangelists, now Loma Linda University.
VIII; 1906–1908		Lucas A. Reed was the eighth and last president of Healdsburg College. During his first year leading the school, 1906, the name was changed to Pacific Union College. Before assuming the presidency, Reed had served as the dean of men while teaching. He was able to bring a brief period of financial correction during the 1906–07 school year, but that did not continue the next year. In 1907, the school sold a part of its campus to raise funds. The next year, Pacific Union College announced plans to move, making that the last year of Pacific Union College in Healdsburg, as well as the last year of Reed's presidency.
IX; 1908–1921	Charles Walter Irwin	Charles Walter Irwin became the first president of Pacific Union College after its move to Angwin, California in 1909. He continued in that position for twelve years, until 1921. Before taking the position at Pacific College, as it was known his first year, he had served as principal of the school now known as Avondale College on Lake Macquarie in Cooranbong, New South Wales, Australia. His stated goal was that PUC would "educate the whole man", which he set out to accomplish by bringing in a group of highly qualified faculty. He is honored by a plaque on the campus of Pacific Union College which declares that "With faith in his heart and a pickax in his hand, he carved a college out of a hillside." His presidency is credited with setting in place standards that have continued throughout the history of the school.
X; 1921–1934	William Edward Nelson	William Edward Nelson completed his graduate work at the University of Nebraska; had been a department head at Walla Walla College, now Walla Walla University, in College Place, Washington; and had served for six years successfully as president of Southwestern Junior College, now Southwestern Adventist University, in Keene, Texas. He led the school as it successfully sought accreditation, becoming the first Adventist college to achieve such standing. He served simultaneously as president and business manager of PUC, and is best remembered for his abilities in institutional finance. His successful thirteen-year tenure at the helm of PUC came to a close in 1934 when he was elected director of education for the General Conference of Seventh-day Adventists.
XI; 1934–1943		Walter I. Smith, who received his doctorate in educational administration, was selected as president of Pacific Union College following a tenure as the director of education for the World Seventh-day Adventist Church. During his nine-year tenure, PUC started the Seventh-day Adventist Theological Seminary, now at Andrews University, a graduate education program, and began construction of multiple buildings. The first president to take over following PUC's gaining accreditation, Smith led PUC as it moved from a fledgling but innovative campus to an accredited educational institute with a solid foundation.
XII; 1943–1945		Henry J. Klooster came to Pacific Union College after serving as president of Emmanuel Missionary College, now Andrews University. During his two years leading the school, he focused on encouraging teachers to achieve terminal degrees. He also implemented an affiliation with a school in Hawaii and began planning for constructing a new Library and other structures on campus. In 1945, to the campus' dismay, he abruptly resigned the presidency.
XIII; 1945–1950		Percy W. Christian was the fifth president of PUC to serve in the new Angwin campus. He continued the loosening of standards in social practices at the school. During his presidency, the school had record enrollment. In 1950, he took a new position as president of Andrews University.
XIV; 1950–1954		John E. Weaver, previously president of Walla Walla College, worldwide director of Adventist Education and a medical doctor, became the 14th president of Pacific Union College. His presidency was charged, dealing with changes in student demographics due to World War II and untenable demands from faculty. In 1954, Weaver left PUC to take the lead of Washington Missionary College, now Washington Adventist University.
XV; 1954–1955		Henry L. Sonnenberg, also from Walla Walla College, began his presidency in July 1954. During the few months he led PUC, he emphasized its graduate programs and was able to increase enrollment during his administration. He died of a heart attack in September of 1955.
XVI; 1955–1963		Ray W. Fowler was elected president following President Sonnerbert's death in 1955. He was known for his approachable demeanor and being open to a wide variety of viewpoints. During his presidency, enrollment reached 1,000 students for the first time, and continued to rise. By the time his presidency ended, there were students from 22 countries at PUC. A new library opened, named after the tenth president, William E. Nelson. PUC also opened new research facilities, including a nuclear science lab. In 1963, Fowler resigned and left to lead his alma mater, Union College.
XVII; 1963–1972		Floyd O. Rittenhouse came to PUC after serving as a leader at Andrews University in Michigan. His presidency was marked by raising the college's profile through relationships in the community. During his administration, seven major buildings were built on campus.
XVIII; 1972–1983		John W. Cassell was the academic dean until he became president in 1972. He led the school during the 1975–76 school year as it reached its highest enrollment of 2,300. During Cassell's administration, Dr. Desmond Ford was appointed as a faculty exchange professor, coming from Avondale College in Australia. During the controversy that followed some of Ford's statements, enrollment declined as the school faced a crisis of constituency confidence. Casell resigned as a result of these concerns in 1983.
XIX; 1983–2001		Malcolm Maxwell, the first alumnus to lead PUC, also held the longest presidential tenure to date. Before taking over at PUC, he had been a vice president at Walla Walla University, then known as Walla Walla College. Within his first four years, he had completely removed the school's crisis of confidence from within its constituency. During his presidency, the college added buildings to house the chemistry, biology and other science departments. Work was also done to bring the school's theology department closer in line to views within the school's denomination. After serving for eighteen years, Maxwell became the only president of PUC to date to be honored as President Emeritus by the college's board of trustees.
XX; 2001–2009		Richard Osborn was selected as the 20th president of Pacific Union College, and the 13th on the Angwin campus in 2001. Before taking over at PUC, he was the vice president for education of the Adventist Church in North America. During his presidency, PUC hired its second female vice president and first two Asian vice presidents. Also during his tenure, PUC created a Teaching and Learning Center to focus on student retention.
XXI; 2009–2016		Heather Joy Knight's selection as president of Pacific Union College in 2009 represented a number of milestones. She was the first African American and woman to serve as president of PUC. She was also the first African American woman to lead an Adventist college in North America. Prior to accepting the position as Pacific Union College's president, Knight served as provost at Andrews College. There, her duties consisted of educational development, curriculum planning, academic and research planning, strategic planning, financial goals and research and other various administrative duties. Knight had outstanding first years at Pacific Union College, as the school had its highest enrollment rate in 24 years, and the largest freshman-to-sophomore year retention rate of 85%, in 2013. PUC also received its largest single cash gift in its 134-year history, of $2.6 million. Upon the chief financial officer's resignation in January 2016 and the resignation of psychology and social work professors the same year, the PUC board had a thorough evaluation of Knight's presidency. It was found that there was extended discounting to keep enrollment levels, a breach in academic freedom, and increased spending throughout her presidency. Knight resigned as president in December 2016.
XXII (interim); 2016–2017		Eric Anderson filled in for six months as interim president after Knight's departure. He had a rich history of Adventist leadership, having been the president of Southwestern Adventist University in Texas from 2005 to 2014. He is the fourth generation of teachers at Pacific Union College in his family, and holds PhD in history from the University of Chicago. He was a widely successful interim president, and promoted the collaboration between the college and the wider Napa Valley community. The six-month interim of January–June 2017 was a time of adversity and conflict of political and social polarities within the entire country, including the college. on 21 February, Anderson issued a message stating that "Nothing has happened to change PUC's rock-solid commitment to our students, whatever their birthplace or ethnicity". Anderson's background in writing on historical topics, including the Reconstruction of North Carolina, philanthropic support of black education, and Progressive Era vice reform, well equipped him to unite PUC in a time when the school and country were going through a major transition.
XXIII; 2017–2021		Bob A. Cushman was inaugurated on April 20, 2018 and served as Pacific Union College's president until July 2021. He has a background in geology and obtained his Ph.D from the Colorado School of Mines. He has a history as a researcher, author, professor, academic dean, senior vice president, and chief financial officer. Cushman's eclectic background of administrative positions gave him a clear perspective on what needs to be attended to and addressed as president of a college. He is described by the previous president, Eric Anderson, as "unpretentious, thoughtful, and a good listener".
XXIV; 2021–		Ralph Trecartin was inaugurated on April 16, 2022, and has served as Pacific Union College's president since July 2021.
