= Malcolm Maxwell =

President Pacific Union College

D. Malcolm Maxwell

19th President of Pacific Union College
- In office 1983–2001
- Preceded by: John Cassell
- Succeeded by: Richard Osborn

Vice President for Academic Administration at Walla Walla University
- In office 1978–1981

Personal details
- Born: 1934 Watford, England
- Died: 2007 (aged 72–73) Scottsdale, Arizona
- Spouse: Eileen Maxwell
- Education: Pacific Union College; Andrews University; Drew University
- Profession: Professor; College administrator

Donald Malcolm Maxwell (1934 in Watford, England – 2007 in Scottsdale, Arizona) was the 19th President of Pacific Union College.

== Education ==
Maxwell graduated from Pacific Union College in 1956 with degrees in theology and biblical languages. He went on to pursue a Master of Arts degree at Andrews University in systematic theology. After completing his Master of Arts, he pursued a doctorate in biblical studies specializing in the New Testament at New Jersey's Drew University. While there, he was named a Rockefeller Fellow and Drew University Scholar.

== Personal life ==
The youngest of four sons of Arthur S. Maxwell, of Uncle Arthur fame, Maxwell met his wife, Eileen, in 1955 while still a student at Pacific Union College. They were married for 52 years until her death in April 2007.

== Educator ==
Maxwell taught in the theology departments of Union College and then Walla Walla College before being selected chair of the department, and later, dean in Walla Walla's School of Theology. In 1978 he became the Vice President for Academic Administration at Walla Walla until 1981 when he returned to teach in the theology department, where he taught until accepting an opportunity to serve as President of Pacific Union College.

== President of Pacific Union College ==
In June 1983, Malcolm Maxwell became president of Pacific Union College. He was the first alumnus of the school to serve as president. At the time, the school was facing a crisis of confidence due to controversies which erupted under the previous administration. As president, Maxwell immediately addressed the controversy and set out on a mission to rebuild confidence in the school. A prodigious fundraiser, he focussed much of his efforts in that area. Within two years of his arrival on campus, the school completed construction of the science complex and Chan Shun Hall, a previously stalled building project. As president, he was noted for his "ready smile, down-to-earth advice, and folksy family" speeches. Upon retirement from an 18-year tenure as president in 2001, Maxwell became the first president to be designated president emeritus by the Pacific Union College Board.

== Retirement and death ==
Following his retirement from the Presidency in 2001, Maxwell continued as a Professor in the Religion Department at Pacific Union College until 2006. Following his full retirement in April 2007, Maxwell and his wife, Eileen, were in the process of moving to Scottsdale, Arizona when his wife Eileen died. He soon came down with Lou Gehrig disease which moved with dismaying speed until his death at the age of 73 in October of the same year.
