= Sidney Brownsberger =

American educator (1845–1930)

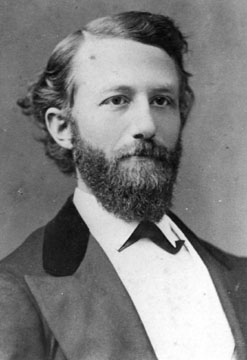

1st President of Pacific Union College
- In office 1882–1886
- Preceded by: Office created
- Succeeded by: William C. Grainger

Personal details
- Born: 1845 Perrysburg, Ohio
- Died: 1930 (aged 84–85) Fletcher, North Carolina
- Education: University of Michigan
- Profession: College administrator Educator

Sidney Brownsberger (born September 20, 1845, Perrysburg, Ohio; died August 13, 1930, Fletcher, North Carolina) was an American Seventh-day Adventist educator and administrator. He helped to develop Battle Creek College (now Andrews University) and later Healdsburg College (now Pacific Union College).

== Early years ==
Sidney Brownsberger was the youngest of eight children born to the family of John and Barbara Brownsberger. Twelve years before Sidney was born, the family moved from southern Pennsylvania to Perrysburg, Ohio.

In 1865, he completed preparatory studies at Baldwin University. In 1869, he enrolled in the University of Michigan to pursue a classical degree. graduating with an A.B. At the University of Michigan, Brownsberger served on the academic senate.

While a student at Ann Arbor, he first heard of Seventh-day Adventists. He sent for all the literature printed by the church at the time. As a student he spent much of his spare time studying the Bible and the Adventist books he had acquired. Agreeing with what he read, without ever having seen a Seventh-day Adventist, he began keeping the Sabbath alone during his junior year in college in 1868.

Brownsberger's early commitment to his newfound faith faltered. Looking back at those early years of struggling faith, he described the Holy Spirit striving with him telling him to stop trifling and be a man. After his graduation he became superintendent of schools in Maumee, Ohio, and then superintendent of schools in Delta, Ohio. It was here that he resumed his observance of the Sabbath. The following year (1873), Adventist church leaders invited him to head the fledgling school that had been established in Battle Creek, Michigan.

== Battle Creek College ==
Adventist interest in education began in the 1850s. James White wrote out reasons for the development of Church schools in the Review and Herald. The first school on record is one started at Buck's Bridge. Goodloe Bell began a school at Battle Creek with the Kellogg and White children. When plans developed for a formal College, the organizers turned to Brownsberger. Goodloe Bell did not have the decree standing of Brownsberger.

In 1872, Ellen White had published her views on "Proper Education". She presented these to the board of the new school. Afterwards, people turned to Brownsberger for his reaction. He said he knew nothing about managing such a school; manual labor combined with education based on the Bible.

The board decided to start an ordinary school rather than one meeting Ellen White's recommendation.

Brownsberger would later observe that Ellen White's educational principles were so far advanced that no one understood how to implement them.

== Disrupted marital life ==
While at Healdsburg College, Brownsberger's marriage broke down. His wife divorced him; he didn't contest the divorce. Sometime later he married his secretary. Willie White, Ellen G. White's son and assistant, commented about the difficult relationship Brownsberger had with his first wife. While in Australia, Ellen White wrote a letter to Haskell discussing Brownsberger's situation. She reported that he had confessed his wrong and that she believed that God had forgiven him. However, she expressed concern that his record would follow him. Otherwise, she would have invited him to come to Australia and work for the church there.

== See also ==
- Seventh-day Adventist Church
- Seventh-day Adventist theology
- Seventh-day Adventist eschatology
- History of the Seventh-day Adventist Church
- Teachings of Ellen White
- Inspiration of Ellen White
- Prophecy in the Seventh-day Adventist Church
- Investigative judgment
- The Pillars of Adventism
- Second Advent
- Baptism by Immersion
- Conditional Immortality
- Historicism
- Three Angels' Messages
- End times
- Sabbath in Seventh-day Adventism
- Ellen G. White
- Adventist
- Seventh-day Adventist Church Pioneers
- Seventh-day Adventist worship

== Bibliography ==
- Burton, Larry D. (2010). "Seventh-day Adventist Schools". In Hunt, Thomas C. (ed.). Encyclopedia of Educational Reform and Dissent. Vol. 2. Thousand Oaks, California: Sage. pp. 818–820. ISBN 9781412956642.
- Johnsen, Leigh (Winter 1976), "Brownsberger and Battle Creek: The Beginning of Adventist Higher Education.", Adventist Heritage Magazine, 3: 30–41
- Land, Gary (2005), Historical Dictionary of Seventh-day Adventists, Lanham, Maryland: Scarecrow Press, p. 47, ISBN 0-8108-5345-0
- McCumber, Harold Oliver (1946), Pioneering the Message in the Golden West (PDF), Mountain View, California: Pacific Press Publishing Association, archived from the original (PDF) on 2011-08-25
- Michigan Department of Public Instruction (1875), Thirty-eighth Annual Report of the Superintendent of Public Instruction of the State of Michigan, with Accompanying Documents, for the year 1874., Lansing, Michigan: W.S. George & Co., p. 214
- McKeighan, John E. (1866). "Freshmen". The University Castalia. 1 (1). Ann Arbor: The Independents: 20.
- Shuler, J. L. (October 2, 1930), "Prof. Sidney Brownsberger" (PDF), Review and Herald, 107 (51): 29
- White, Ellen G. (1987) [1892], "122, Letter to S. N. Haskell. August 22, 1892.", The Ellen G. White 1888 Materials: letters, manuscripts, articles, and sermons relating to the 1888 Minneapolis general conference, vol. 3, The Ellen G. White Estate, p. 997, archived from the original on 2011-08-10
