= Harold W. Hopp =

American judge

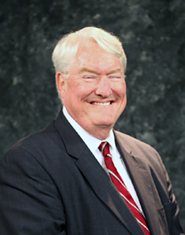

Judge of the Riverside County Superior Court
- Incumbent
- Assumed office 2005
- Appointed by: Arnold Schwarzenegger
- Preceded by: Robert C. Taylor

Personal details
- Born: Harold Wayne Hopp; March 25, 1960 (age 66) Takoma Park, Maryland, U.S.
- Party: Republican
- Education: Pacific Union College (BS); USC Gould School of Law (JD)

Harold Wayne Hopp (born March 25, 1960) is an American lawyer and judge from California.

== Education ==
Hopp completed his undergraduate education at Pacific Union College in California's Napa Valley, graduating in 1983. He went on to receive his Juris Doctor from the University of Southern California Law School in 1986.

== Legal career ==
After graduating from law school he served as an associate with Best, Best & Krieger and with the firm of Paul Hastings, Janofsky and Walker. He later served as Of Counsel for the law firm of Quinn, Emanuel, Urquhart, Oliver & Hedges from 1990 to 2005.

== Judicial career ==
On May 16, 2005, then-Governor Arnold Schwarzenegger appointed Hopp to serve as a California Superior Court Judge in Riverside County.
