= Wesley Pomeroy =

American lawyer

Wesley A.C. Pomeroy (January 1, 1920 – May 4, 1998) was an American lawyer, Assistant U.S. Attorney General, federal coordinator for the Law Enforcement Assistance Administration, assistant director of the DEA, and founding member of various humanitarian and policy-making organizations.

== Biography ==
=== Early years ===
Pomeroy was born in Burbank, California. He attended Pacific Union College in Napa County, where he met, and later married, Marjorie Cusick. He began his law enforcement career at the California Highway Patrol as a state trooper. In 1943, he joined the Marines and served in the Pacific during World War II. After the war, he resumed his job as a California Highway Patrol officer. He joined the San Mateo County Sheriff's Office in 1951, where he rose through the ranks to become undersheriff in 1960. While in this position, he pioneered the department's work-furlough and honor camp facilities, which were the only such programs in the nation at the time. During this time, he also spent his evenings attending law school. He received a law degree from San Francisco Law School and subsequently passed the California bar exam.

In 1964, he was charged with managing security for the Republican National Convention in the Cow Palace, San Francisco, California. The convention was met with great controversy as there was conflict not only within the Republican Party itself but also from anti-war protesters and civil rights activists. Before this convention, political party conventions were only given cursory security staff unless a former or active president attended, with which Secret Service would be present. Due to several violent and non-violent threats towards the convention, Pomeroy was brought in to manage 18 different police forces providing security to the venue. Due to his diplomatic efforts and management, the convention was successful and not disrupted. Pomeroy continued to serve as a consultant on security for national conventions of both political parties until 1992.

=== Government career ===
His success managing the Republican National Convention drew national attention, and in 1967 he was made coordinator of federal law enforcement. Under Warren Christopher, who was the deputy attorney general, he managed the Federal Command Post at the Conrad Hilton hotel overlooking Grant Park in Chicago during the 1968 Democratic Convention. Mayor Richard Daley had requested federal back-up after numerous threats by protesters. After assessing the situation, Pomeroy was frustrated with Mayor Daley's approaches, especially putting officers on 12-hour shifts, as well as being informed that he had no jurisdiction over the Chicago police force. He did have control over the Illinois National Guard and ordered them to replace the Chicago Police Department at various times, including one night in front of the Hilton hotel. Pomeroy is credited to have, despite Mayor Daley's interference, kept the situation from becoming worse than it could have been.

Pomeroy was appointed Assistant Attorney General in 1968 by Ramsey Clark, the Attorney General in President Lyndon B. Johnson's administration. Clark appointed him to help coordinate anti-crime efforts, as well as heading the Federal area of the investigation into the assassination of Martin Luther King Jr. During this time he also implemented plans for protecting all the government buildings in Washington, D.C.

Lyndon B. Johnson then appointed Pomeroy as the Republican member to lead the Law Enforcement Assistance Administration along with Patrick V. Murphy and Ralph Liu. He was replaced when Richard Nixon took over as President of the United States in late 1969.

Ramsey Clark later stated after Pomeroy's death, "Wes Pomeroy was a loving and gentle person who worked hard, over the years, to heal the violence in our society. He was one of the few people in law enforcement whose interest and commitment was humanitarian and who understood that security depends finally on love not force."

Pomeroy returned to public service in 1977 under the Carter administration. He was a consultant on the Drug Abuse Council (now part of the National Institute on Drug Abuse) before becoming the assistant director of the Drug Enforcement Administration. He also served as the associate director of the White House Office of Drug Abuse Policy (now the Office of National Drug Control Policy).

=== Woodstock Festival ===
One of the most memorable aspects of Wesley Pomeroy's career was serving as vice president and director of security for the Woodstock Festival of 1969. Despite high-profile bands and almost 500,000 in attendance, there were only 2 confirmed deaths, both of which were accidental. Pomeroy went on to head security for some high-profile bands' US tours, including Led Zeppelin.

He described the problems with such a large festival in an interview with the Redwood City Tribune. "I think I would discourage anyone thinking about putting on another one. When you get that many people together who want to use drugs and take off their clothes, it is impossible to enforce the laws against those things," he was quoted. The last Woodstock concert, in 1999, was shut down early due to violence, rape, fires, and other malicious civil unrest.

=== Career after government service ===
Pomeroy briefly had a criminal justice consulting firm from 1969 to 1971, when he relocated his family from Falls Church, Virginia to Minnesota after taking a job with the University of Minnesota. The board of regents appointed Pomeroy as the director of safety and development in 1971. He held this position until 1974, when he resigned to return to traditional law enforcement. Pomeroy moved back to California and served as the Berkeley, California, chief of police. He left this post in 1977 at the request to serve in Jimmy Carter's administration.

After Carter left office, Pomeroy became the deputy director of the Michigan Department of Mental Health. He went on to become an honorary fellow with the American Psychiatric Association, an award seldom given to non-physicians.

Pomeroy assumed the role of executive director of the Miami-Dade Independent Review Panel in 1983. He retains the title in emeritus to this day. His service in this capacity was so valued that mandatory ordinances for retirement were suspended twice so that he could continue in this position. After heart bypass surgery, he retired in 1995.

=== Organizational involvement ===
Wesley Pomeroy was a key figure in the creation of prominent organizations and served important advisory roles in others. He was the founder and president of the International Association of the Civilian Oversight of Law Enforcement (now the National Association of the Civilian Oversight of Law Enforcement), was a founder of the Police Executive Research Forum, and a founding member of the International Study of Panetics. He was also a long-time member of the American Civil Liberties Union (where he also previously served on the board of directors), National Drug Strategy Network, National Organization for the Reform of Marijuana Laws (also serving on the advisory board in 1977), the National Association for the Advancement of Colored People, American Psychiatric Association, the Drug Policy Foundation (where he also served as a director until his death), and the Unrepresented People's Positive Action Council.

=== Death ===
Wesley Pomeroy died May 4, 1998, aged 78, at Mount Sinai Medical Center in Miami Beach, FL, of complications from heart failure.

He was survived by his second wife, Lonna P. Carroll, three daughters: Nancy Bucher of Palm Springs, CA, Virginia Pomeroy of Germantown, WI, and Victoria Pomeroy of Germantown, TN as well as five grandchildren, four stepchildren and seven step-grandchildren, and three step great-grandchildren. He was preceded in death by one daughter, Patricia Pomeroy.
