= Graham Maxwell =

Theologian and professor (1921–2010)

Arthur Graham Crowder Maxwell (18 July 1921 – 28 November 2010), often abbreviated as A. Graham Maxwell, was a Seventh-day Adventist theologian, and the emeritus professor of New Testament studies at Loma Linda University. In a 1985 survey of 55 religion teachers at North American Adventist colleges, Maxwell tied for fourth place among most influential Adventist authors.

== Biography ==
=== 1921–1936: Early years in England ===
A. Graham Maxwell was born in Watford, England on July 18, 1921. His father was "Uncle Arthur" Maxwell, who was known for his children's books. His mother was Rachel Elizabeth Maxwell (née Joyce). In the Maxwell home were six children, four boys and two girls. First Maureen, then Graham, Mervyn, Lawrence, Malcolm, and Deirdre. All the children in their younger days attended non-Adventist schools. They all grew up devoted Seventh-day Adventists. Most of them became influential leaders within the church.

Music played an important part in young Maxwell's life. At fifteen years of age he sang for the 1936 British Union's quadrennial session held at Stanborough Park. The British Advent Messenger reported that "Master Graham Maxwell, the boy singer of the Stanborough Park church, pleasingly rendered the solo, 'How lovely are Thy dwellings'". A week earlier, at a youth rally, he is reported to have sung what some might view as a prayer later answered in his own life, "God Make Me Kind."

Early influences apart from immediate family include R. A. Anderson who was an associate of his father. (Anderson received a call to California the same time his father did.); F. C. Gilbert; W.G.C. Murdoch; Meade MacGuire. His uncle, Spencer George Crowder Maxwell, left for Africa a year before Maxwell was born. Spencer's influence was one of respected service and the occasional visit, such as the 1936 meetings, also attended by the 15-year-old Maxwell.

=== 1938–1943: Student years at Pacific Union College ===
He came to America in 1936, and lived in Los Altos, California where his father was editor for the Signs of the Times. In 1938, he began studies at Pacific Union College. He was the spokesperson for the new students at the reception and handshake services. By 1940, he held was one of the student leaders. He helped earn his way through college by selling Christian books as a colporteur. Maxwell began teaching Greek as a student in 1942.

Maxwell graduated with a Bachelor of Arts from Pacific Union College with a double major in Ministerial and Biblical Languages. He met Rosalyn Helen Gildersleeve at Pacific Union College, and they married in 1943. They had three girls, Lorna, Audrey and Alice. By his death in 2010, he had 7 grandchildren and 4 great-grandchildren.

=== 1943–1961: Teaching years at Pacific Union College ===
==== Professional development ====
Maxwell taught at Pacific Union College full-time from 1944 until 1961. In 1944, Pacific Union College awarded him a Master of Arts degree along with Raymond F. Cottrell and James Paul Stauffer. In 1945, as instructor of Greek and English, he gave the April Rine lecture before an audience of teachers and students of the English and language departments. His subject was the Romantic movement in English literature. In 1946 Maxwell met W. G. C. Murdoch, the principal of the England's SDA college. Murdoch reported:

"It was a pleasant surprise to meet young Graham Maxwell in Chicago. Graham has grown to be very like his father and is giving such promise as a teacher that the college board of Pacific Union College has voted him time off to study for his doctor's degree at the University of Chicago..."

He received his Ph.D. in New Testament in 1959 from the University of Chicago Divinity School; his thesis: 'Elements of Interpretation in the Translation of the New Testament.' He focused especially on the book of Romans. Upon receiving his doctorate, he was appointed Chairman of the Division of Religion at Pacific Union College, replacing L. H. Hartin who retired at the close of the 1959 school year. Maxwell remained division chair until moving to Loma Linda in 1961.

==== Leadership experience ====
In 1948, Maxwell was elected president of the PUC Alumni Association (for a two-year term.) In July, 1950, some 500 P.U.C. alumni gathered in San Francisco's Whitcomb Hotel for a Luncheon timed to coincide with the influx of denominational workers from all over the world for the General Conference meetings. Maxwell was toastmaster for the occasion. Back on campus, he organized and led out in faculty and staff social events.

In 1950, both he and his brother Mervyn were ordained to the Gospel ministry.

=== 1961–1988: Teaching years at Loma Linda University ===
Maxwell taught at Loma Linda University for the next 27 years, and for 15 of those years he was the Director of the Division of Religion. In 1983, at a ministerial retreat in Michigan, Maxwell was honored for forty years of service to the Seventh-day Adventist church. In 1988 he retired from Loma Linda University as an Emeritus Professor of New Testament.

He was a grammarian in German, Spanish, English, Greek, Hebrew, and Aramaic, yet was noted for his willingness to learn from those he taught.

Maxwell influenced many people within his denomination. For most of his adult career he taught a Sabbath School class which had a profound impact on many of those attending. He used the Socratic method of teaching. He insisted that his students think things out. To encourage such thinking, he began a class in what he called Biblical Philosophy. Central to this philosophy were these questions: "Is God arbitrary, vengeful, stern, and severe; as His enemies have made Him out to be? Or, is He very patient, and kind, and forgiveness personified?"

His sense of humor was appreciated by many. One associate describes a visit by Maxwell to their house. It was middle August in Southern California. The father of the house "came to the door wearing a plaid work shirt, open at the neck to reveal heavy underwear, heavy wool pants, wearing lined gloves." Maxwell asked him if he could come up to his house which was under construction, and give him some building advice. The father agreed and went to get his cap and jacket. The son said to Maxwell that his father seems to have the same problem that King David had in old age. Maxwell paused for a second and then said, "Yes, but it seems he has found a different solution."

=== 1988–2010: Retirement years ===
In 2005, A special event celebrating the founding of Loma Linda University took place November 11 to 13, at Loma Linda University's Drayson Center. On Sabbath morning, November 12, worship services were led by longtime faculty members Maxwell and Louis Venden.

In 2006, at the Loma Linda University Adventist Health Sciences Center (LLUAHSC) Centennial Gala, “Looking Back to the Future,” held on April 9, Maxwell was honored with the Vanguard Award for Mission of Wholeness, "to make man whole”, along with eleven others. Recipients for the Vanguard Award for Mission of Wholeness were: Wil Alexander, Leonard Brand, Beverly Buckles, Harrison Evans, Kiti Freier, Gordon Hadley, George Hardinge IV, Lucille Lewis, Maxwell, William Murdoch Jr., Jack Provonsha, and Gerald Winslow.

== Theology ==
=== God ===
==== Can God Be Trusted? ====
In December, 1976, Neal C. Wilson, President of the North American Division of the Seventh-day Adventist Church visited Maxwell at Loma Linda University. Subsequently, in the Review and Herald, he announced:

"Early in December I was at Loma Linda University and visited with A. Graham Maxwell about the progress he is making in writing two books. The first deals with the question "Can God be trusted?" and the second develops the theme "The picture of God and what we are told about His character in all 66 books of the Bible."...

"Dr. Maxwell, a respected and much-appreciated professor of religion at Loma Linda University, has been granted a leave of absence for three quarters to concentrate on writing these much-needed books. One of the critical issues currently being discussed in theological circles and religious journals has to do with misconceptions about God's character. This should come as no surprise to Seventh-day Adventists, because Ellen G. White has warned us that in the final struggle of the great controversy between Christ and Satan everything possible will be done to distort and malign God's character. Creating doubt and destroying faith in the integrity of God's character has been one of the most effective tools employed by Satan. Each of us is a target for the deceptive efforts of evil forces seeking to discredit God's love and weaken faith in His word..."

Maxwell's book Can God Be Trusted? became the Seventh-day Adventist Church's Missionary Book of the Year for 1978. This book was published by sections in the twelve issues of the Signs of the Times in that same year.

==== Belief in a personal God ====
Maxwell held to a theistic worldview. In his book Can God Be Trusted he begins by describing a conflict that arose between God and Lucifer who later became known as Satan. Adventists consider this the beginning of what they refer to as the Great Controversy. Maxwell focused on Lucifer's lies about God:

"To set himself up as God he first must undermine confidence in the One he wished to supplant, and he sought to do this by destroying God's reputation. Since he could find no fault in God, he must resort to lying and deceit.

So began that long struggle for the loyalty of God's free, intelligent creatures. Who was right? God or the brilliant Light Bearer? Could it be true that God was arbitrary and severe, unworthy of the love and trust of the beings He had made? What kind of god would allow his character to be so challenged? Was it strength or weakness that led our God to permit such long debate, to allow this controversy to spread throughout His universe?

Finally Satan and his followers ventured into open revolt. Then God, in His farsighted plan for the best good of all concerned, expelled the rebels from His presence, and the great controversy was extended to the planet on which we live."

God, according to Maxwell, was the creator of all things who took actions motivated by love for all.

=== The Bible as God's special revelation ===
==== Bible translations and the word of God ====
In 1952, at thirty-one years of age, Elder Maxwell expressed confidence and good will toward Biblical scholars and translators. He stated that their work in translating the Bible may be of varied quality, but any version sincerely prepared by a qualified scholar(s) may rightfully claim to be the word of God:

"A recent sensational article in Look magazine has suggested that modern research among the ancient manuscripts of the Bible is revealing that actually we are quite uncertain about the authenticity of a large share of the Biblical text. The writer was particularly referring to an enormous research project now in progress on both sides of the Atlantic with headquarters at Oxford and Chicago Universities.

The purpose of this vast endeavor is to completely recheck the sources of the New Testament text in the thousands of Greek manuscripts, the early versions, the lectionaries, and the writings of the early fathers of the church. I have watched friends of mine at work on this project—and very tedious but thorough work it is. The results will hardly be those so shockingly presented in the Look article, but rather will provide further evidence of the remarkable preservation of the Scriptural text.

There is still only one Bible, but more and still more versions. Not all are of equal quality, but any version sincerely prepared by an adequately qualified scholar or committee of scholars—and this would include all of the better known versions—may rightfully claim to be the word of God."

=== Salvation ===
==== Sin ====
Maxwell defined sin as a "breakdown of trust in God"

He wrote:

"The fact that God’s friends are not so preoccupied with their legal standing does not mean that they take sin lightly. Precisely the opposite is true! Whereas servants are concerned about breaking the rules, friends are concerned about anything that would undermine trust and damage their relationship with God. Most of all, they are concerned about anything that would in any way misrepresent God—whether or not the details have been spelled out in any law.

Friends understand salvation as the healing of the damage sin has done. And sin’s damage, if not healed, is nothing less than fatal. Disorderly, irresponsible behavior, if persisted in, can totally destroy the capacity for trust and trustworthiness.

To the servant, what makes sin most dangerous is that it angers God.

To the friend, what makes sin most dangerous is what it does to the sinner. To persist in sin is to destroy oneself."

==== The Gospel as the good news about God ====
"The good news is that God is not the kind of person Satan has made Him out to be... Since the great controversy began, it has been Satan's studied purpose to persuade angels and men that God is not worthy of their faith and love. He has pictured the Creator as a harsh, demanding tyrant who lays arbitrary requirements upon His people just to show His authority and test their willingness to obey... (But) instead of destroying or resorting to force, God simply took His case into court. In order to prove the rightness of His cause, to demonstrate that His way of governing the universe was the best for all concerned, God humbly submitted His own character to the investigation and judgment of His creatures... The good news is that God has won His case. Though all of us should let Him down, God cannot lose His case. He has already won! The universe has conceded that the evidence is on His side, that the devil has lied in his charges against God."

Maxwell asserted that Jesus showed the truth about the Father:

"It is finished," Jesus cried. John 19:30. By the life that He lived and the unique and awful way He died, Jesus has demonstrated the righteousness of His Father and has answered any question about God's character and government. See Romans 3:25, 26."

==== Controversy about salvation ====
Many charges have been made that Maxwell taught the moral influence theory of the atonement although Maxwell denied it.

Alden Thompson has compared various different Adventist theologians to either Peter, Paul or Apollos. He compares Maxwell to Apollos, because of their shared emphasis on God's love.

=== Christian life ===
==== Prayer and Bible application ====
In 1941, at twenty years of age, student colporteur Maxwell expressed his belief in prayer and in persistence. He used a biblical story to help him meet a difficult situation while selling Christian books:

"The desert has taught me many lessons that I shall never forget. It has taught me that the best substitute for 'high pressure' is prayerful persistence. Six times I called on one desert family, and six times I came away without an order. There was always some reason why they could not take time to see me. Then I recalled how Joshua conquered the city of Jericho, and back I went the seventh time! And just as the walls of Jericho fell flat as the Israelites encompassed the city the seventh time, so the walls of resistance crumbled around this desert family, and I left them with the largest order I have yet received! To my fellow wingmen I would suggest: 'Remember Jericho! Pray often, and never give up until you have called the seventh time!' "

==== Sanctification and perfection ====
During the 1950s, those who reported on Maxwell's talks for church periodicals commented on his strong emphasis on perfection:

1951. "Youth Rally Speaker. The featured speaker of the Sabbath afternoon regional youth rally, February 17, was Elder Graham Maxwell, of Pacific Union College. He appealed for everyone to strive more earnestly to become like Christ in character—NOW."

1952. "Newbury Park Academy News Notes: ... Each student is striving more diligently for the goal of perfection, especially after Elder Graham Maxwell from Pacific Union College gave the spring Week of Prayer studies, pointing out that perfection should be our goal if we are to attain eternal life."

1954. Maxwell writes: "Recently I had the privilege of helping with the spring week of devotion on the Loma Linda campus of the College of Medical Evangelists, April 11–17... The discussions during the week were based on the question "When will Jesus return?" and on the answer found in that memorable sentence in Christ's Object Lessons, page 69, 'When the character of Christ shall be perfectly reproduced in His people, then He will come.' "

1958. " 'Be Ye Therefore Perfect' was the sermon delivered by Elder Graham Maxwell, teaching us that we can and we must be perfect to meet Jesus when He comes again soon."

This emphasis on "Perfection" could be the same as emphasis on "wholesome Christian living". Maxwell conducted a Spring Week of Prayer in 1953 at La Sierra College. He was invited back to conduct another Spring Week of Prayer in 1956:

"The speaker for the annual spring Week of Prayer being conducted at La Sierra College March 16–24 is A. Graham Maxwell, professor of Biblical languages at Pacific Union College. This is a return appointment for Professor Maxwell, as he conducted a similar week here three years ago. His fine understanding of our young people and their church and his contagious enthusiasm for wholesome Christian living make him especially effective in working with Adventist youth. The students and faculty here genuinely appreciate his work."

=== Last things ===
==== The destruction of the wicked ====
Isaiah 33:14-17 asks who can live in the eternal fire and the answer is the righteous people. Graham Maxwell taught that hell fire is not the same substance as say in lighting a match or in a volcano, but that it is the glory, beauty and love of God seeing God in all God's brightness and glory. God treats everyone the same. Everyone is welcomed into heaven, however some will find it heaven to be there with God and their loved ones. But just as when Jesus was on earth some loved to be with him others wanted to be away from him even to the point of wanting to put him to death. So at the end as we see God visible in person those who are used to yielding to the Holy Spirit's prompting will find it heaven to live in the eternal fire, living forever with God. But others will choose to separate themselves from God. Since God is the only source of life, if you separate yourself from the only source of life the only other option is death, with God crying "Why oh why will you die? How can I give you up? How can I let you go?" but God will not force the will to force them to be citizens of heaven and thus allow them to have the natural result of their choice.

== Criticisms of Maxwell's theology ==
=== Adventist publications avoid opposing Maxwell by name ===
The Adventist Church has not published any specific criticism against Maxwell by name. It has addressed concerns for those within the church who promote what has been called the moral influence theory of atonement. Maxwell and those who support his teachings have denied that their views are the same as the Moral Influence Theory.

In 1990, Dr. Alden Thompson, of Walla Walla College's Department of Theology, noted this practice of avoiding the direct naming of individuals and expressed the wish that the church could be more open and still respect those who differ:

"...George Knight has given me permission to use his recent book on the atonement, My Gripe With God (Review and Herald,1990) to illustrate my point. Knight and I agree that naming names would be good. But we probably don't see eye to eye on the atonement — a topic on which two people could likely never agree!

Knight argues that the (objective) substitutionary view of the atonement is the foundation for all other views. In the process, he critiques the subjective view of the atonement as articulated among Adventists by Maxwell and Jack Provonsha. But Knight does not mention Maxwell and Provonsha by name. I wish he had. I wish it were safe to do so — without jeopardizing the status of Knight, Maxwell, or Provonsha as faithful and committed Adventists.

Knight looks to Paul for support (especially Romans and Galatians); Maxwell and Provonsha appeal to John (especially John 14-17). The perspectives are different; both are biblical; we should expect both in the church. But a tug-of-war view of truth tempts us to homogenize John and Paul, making them say the same thing, namely, what we want or need to hear. Then we can't hear our brothers and sisters, or listen to their needs, letting them hear Paul or John as needed, so that they, too, can worship God with all their hearts and love their neighbors as themselves..."

=== Concerns raised by Adventist scholars ===
Maxwell was well known for his book, Can God Be Trusted? It was a denominational book of the year. David McMahon says it "is conspicuous for what it omits in discussing the atonement." He compares the chapter, "Why Did Jesus Have to Die?" to a similarly titled much earlier article by E. J. Waggoner, "Why Did Christ Die?" (British) Present Truth 21 September 1893, p385–88. Samuele Bacchiocchi equates it with the moral influence theory.

== Publications ==
- Can God Be Trusted? (Nashville, Tennessee: Southern Publishing)
- I want to be free (Mountain View, California: Pacific Press, c. 1970)
- Servants or Friends? (Redlands, California: Pine Knoll, 1992). See one review by Gordon Bietz
