= Howell Mountain, California =

Unincorporated community in California, United States

Howell Mountain
- unincorporated community
- Location in California Howell Mountain (the United States)
- Coordinates: 38°34′53″N 122°27′04″W
- Country: United States
- State: California
- County: Napa
- Elevation: 1,683 ft (513 m)

Howell Mountain (formerly, White Cottage) is an unincorporated community in the Vaca Mountains, within Napa County, California, United States. It lies at an elevation of 1683 feet (513 m).

== History ==
Howell Mountain was originally territory of the Wappo people. It was settled by European-Americans beginning in the 1840s. Wine grapes were first planted on the mountain in the 1870s by William Campbell Watson, grandson-in-law of settler George Yount. Numerous wineries and health spas were built in the area in the late nineteenth and early twentieth centuries.

In August 2020, Howell Mountain was evacuated due to the Hennessey Fire, which resulted in the burning of over 315,000 acres (127,476 ha) in five counties.

== Geography ==
Howell Mountain is located 5.5 miles (8.9 km) north-northeast of Saint Helena.

For census purposes, it forms part of the Angwin census-designated place.
