= Angwin, California =

- census-designated place
- Location in Napa County and the state of California
- Coordinates: 38°34′28″N 122°26′53″W
- Country: United States
- State: California
- County: Napa

Area
  - Total: 4.87 sq mi (12.62 km^{2})
  - Land: 4.83 sq mi (12.51 km^{2})
  - Water: 0.042 sq mi (0.11 km^{2}) 0.86%
- Elevation: 1,749 ft (533 m)

Population (2020)
  - Total: 2,633
  - Density: 545.2/sq mi (210.52/km^{2})
- Time zone: UTC-8 (Pacific (PST))
  - Summer (DST): UTC-7 (PDT)
- ZIP codes: 94508, 94576
- Area code: 707
- FIPS code: 06-02168
- GNIS feature IDs: 1657934; 2407744

Angwin is a census-designated place (CDP) in Napa County, California, United States, best known as the site of Pacific Union College. It is part of the northern San Francisco Bay Area. The population was 2,633 at the 2020 census. Its area code is 707. Its two ZIP codes are 94508 and 94576. It is in the Pacific time zone.

== History ==
The town of Angwin is named for Edwin Angwin (1841–1919), a native of St. Agnes, Cornwall, who in 1875 purchased a 200-acre (0.8 km^{2}) parcel within the Rancho La Jota on Howell Mountain and established the Angwin Resort. By the 1900s, Mr. Angwin owned almost 1,600 acres (6.5 km^{2}) of land in the area.

Prior to 1875, Rancho La Jota was held in its entirety by William Campbell Watson, husband of Elizabeth Anne Davis, the granddaughter of George C. Yount. Mr. Watson began to sell off portions of the Rancho in 1875, Mr. Angwin's being among the first parcels. Soon after a community began to emerge with the success of, and in support of, the Angwin Resort.

In 1909, Healdsburg College (formerly Healdsburg Academy), a Seventh-day Adventist college, moved from its location in Healdsburg when it purchased the Angwin Resort for $60,000 to open Pacific Union College. According to a 1985 KRON-TV news report, more than 80 percent of the population of Angwin belonged to the Seventh-day Adventist Church.

In August 2020, Angwin was evacuated due to the Hennessey Fire.

== Geography ==
According to the United States Census Bureau, the CDP has a total area of 4.9 square miles (13 km^{2}), of which 99.14% is land and 0.86% is water.

Angwin is located within the Howell Mountain AVA.

=== Climate ===
Angwin's Pacific Union College has maintained a National Weather Service cooperative weather station since 1940. Average January temperatures are a maximum of 52.2 °F (11.2 °C) and a minimum of 37.9 °F (3.3 °C). There are an average of 35.3 days with highs of 90.0 °F (32.2 °C) or higher and 25.1 days with lows of 32.0 °F (0.0 °C) or lower. The record high temperature was 110 °F (43 °C) on July 15, 1972. The record low temperature was 14 °F (−10 °C) on December 9, 1972.

Average annual precipitation is 40.60 inches (1,031 mm). The wettest year was 1983 with 88.89 inches (2,258 mm) and the driest year was 2020 with 16.28 inches (414 mm). The most precipitation in one month was 40.81 inches (1,037 mm) in January 2017. The most precipitation in 24 hours was 10.48 inches (266 mm) on October 24, 2021.

Average annual snowfall is 2.0 inches (5.1 cm). The most snow in one year was 23.3 inches (59 cm) in 1952, including 12.8 inches (33 cm) in January.

Climate data for Angwin Pacific Union College, California (1991–2020 normals, extremes 1952–present)
Month	Jan	Feb	Mar	Apr	May	Jun	Jul	Aug	Sep	Oct	Nov	Dec	Year
Record high °F (°C)	77 (25)	78 (26)	84 (29)	91 (33)	101 (38)	106 (41)	110 (43)	107 (42)	108 (42)	99 (37)	86 (30)	75 (24)	110 (43)
Mean maximum °F (°C)	66.4 (19.1)	68.6 (20.3)	75.2 (24.0)	82.0 (27.8)	87.5 (30.8)	95.4 (35.2)	96.8 (36.0)	96.6 (35.9)	94.9 (34.9)	87.1 (30.6)	73.9 (23.3)	64.6 (18.1)	99.6 (37.6)
Mean daily maximum °F (°C)	53.7 (12.1)	55.9 (13.3)	60.3 (15.7)	65.9 (18.8)	72.7 (22.6)	80.0 (26.7)	84.6 (29.2)	84.3 (29.1)	81.3 (27.4)	72.4 (22.4)	59.8 (15.4)	52.7 (11.5)	68.6 (20.3)
Daily mean °F (°C)	46.5 (8.1)	47.8 (8.8)	50.6 (10.3)	54.1 (12.3)	59.7 (15.4)	65.7 (18.7)	69.4 (20.8)	69.1 (20.6)	67.4 (19.7)	61.1 (16.2)	51.3 (10.7)	45.8 (7.7)	57.4 (14.1)
Mean daily minimum °F (°C)	39.3 (4.1)	39.7 (4.3)	40.9 (4.9)	42.3 (5.7)	46.7 (8.2)	51.3 (10.7)	54.1 (12.3)	53.9 (12.2)	53.4 (11.9)	49.7 (9.8)	42.8 (6.0)	38.8 (3.8)	46.1 (7.8)
Mean minimum °F (°C)	29.5 (−1.4)	31.9 (−0.1)	34.3 (1.3)	36.8 (2.7)	41.9 (5.5)	46.5 (8.1)	50.3 (10.2)	49.8 (9.9)	46.1 (7.8)	40.3 (4.6)	33.3 (0.7)	29.1 (−1.6)	27.4 (−2.6)
Record low °F (°C)	19 (−7)	20 (−7)	23 (−5)	25 (−4)	27 (−3)	33 (1)	37 (3)	39 (4)	32 (0)	27 (−3)	24 (−4)	14 (−10)	14 (−10)
Average precipitation inches (mm)	7.80 (198)	7.59 (193)	5.50 (140)	2.37 (60)	1.56 (40)	0.36 (9.1)	0.01 (0.25)	0.04 (1.0)	0.17 (4.3)	1.92 (49)	4.09 (104)	8.30 (211)	39.71 (1,009)
Average precipitation days (≥ 0.01 in)	13.0	11.6	10.7	7.6	4.5	1.3	0.1	0.2	1.1	4.1	8.8	13.5	76.5
Source: NOAA

== Demographics ==
Historical population
Census	Pop.	Note	%±
1970	2,690		—
1980	3,526		31.1%
1990	3,503		−0.7%
2000	3,148		−10.1%
2010	3,051		−3.1%
2020	2,633		−13.7%
U.S. Decennial Census; 1860–1870 1880-1890; 1900 1910 1920; 1930 1940 1950; 1960 1970 1980; 1990 2000 2010

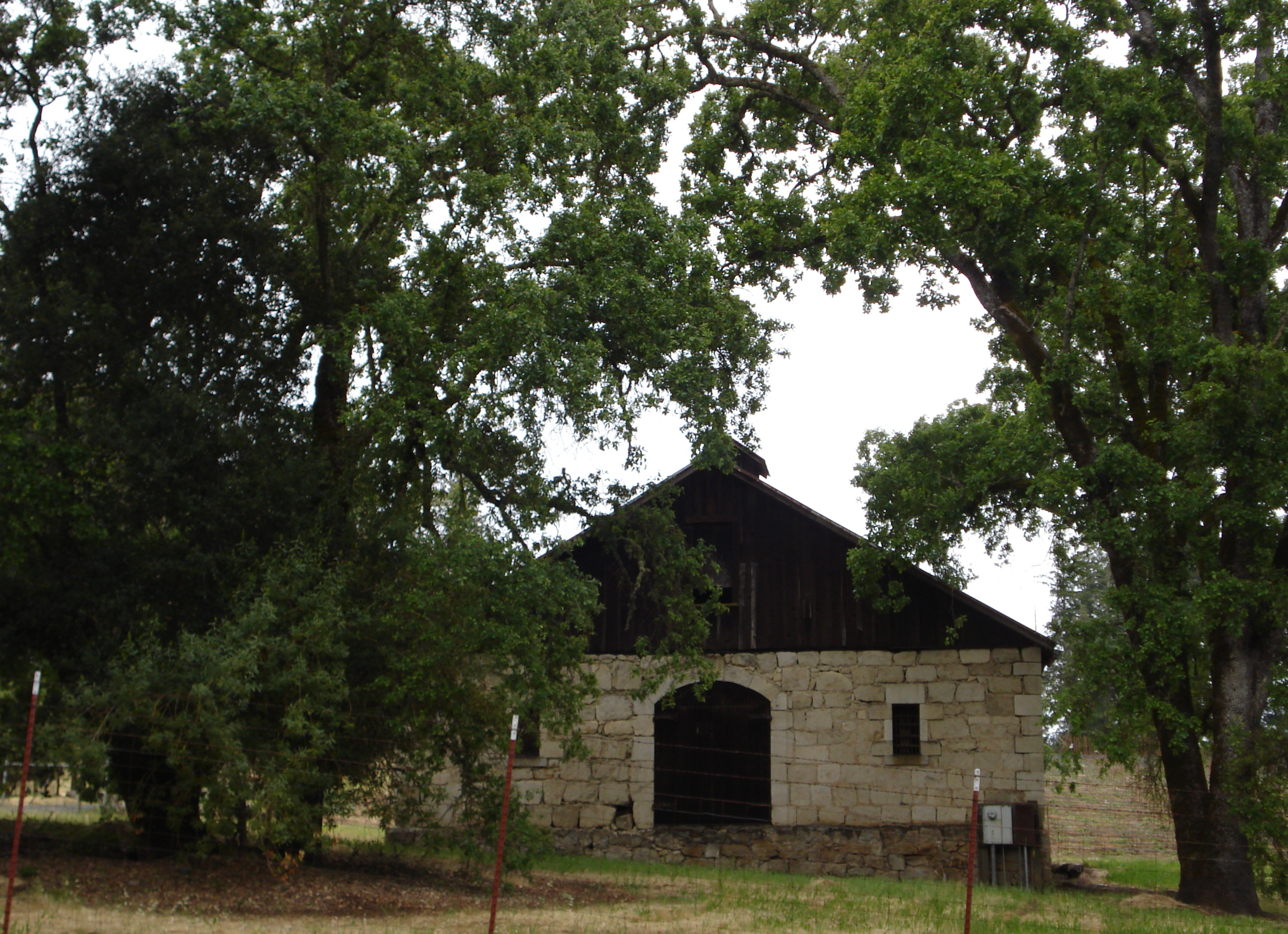
Angwin scenery

Angwin first appeared as an unincorporated community in the 1970 U.S. census; and as a census-designated place in the 1980 United States census.

=== 2020 census ===
As of the 2020 census, Angwin had a population of 2,633. The population density was 545.2 inhabitants per square mile (210.5/km^{2}). The median age was 32.1 years. The age distribution was 15.0% under the age of 18, 26.6% aged 18 to 24, 22.1% aged 25 to 44, 21.9% aged 45 to 64, and 14.4% who were 65 years of age or older. For every 100 females, there were 93.5 males, and for every 100 females age 18 and over, there were 94.4 males age 18 and over.

The census reported that 0.0% of residents lived in urban areas, while 100.0% lived in rural areas. It also reported that 77.3% of the population lived in households, 22.7% lived in non-institutionalized group quarters, and no one was institutionalized.

There were 788 households, of which 25.3% had children under the age of 18 living in them. Of all households, 56.2% were married-couple households, 6.1% were cohabiting couple households, 17.9% were households with a male householder and no spouse or partner present, and 19.8% were households with a female householder and no spouse or partner present. About 24.3% of all households were made up of individuals and 10.4% had someone living alone who was 65 years of age or older. The average household size was 2.58. There were 540 families (68.5% of all households).

There were 873 housing units at an average density of 180.8 units per square mile (69.8 units/km^{2}). Of all housing units, 9.7% were vacant and 90.3% were occupied. The homeowner vacancy rate was 2.9% and the rental vacancy rate was 6.9%. Of occupied units, 50.6% were owner-occupied and 49.4% were occupied by renters.

Racial composition as of the 2020 census
Race	Number	Percent
White	1,340	50.9%
Black or African American	107	4.1%
American Indian and Alaska Native	24	0.9%
Asian	163	6.2%
Native Hawaiian and Other Pacific Islander	6	0.2%
Some other race	667	25.3%
Two or more races	326	12.4%
Hispanic or Latino (of any race)	721	27.4%

=== Income and poverty ===
In 2023, the US Census Bureau estimated that the median household income was $127,115, and the per capita income was $46,345. About 5.1% of families and 10.4% of the population were below the poverty line.

== Government ==
In the California State Legislature, Angwin is in the 3rd senatorial district, represented by Democrat Christopher Cabaldon, and in the 4th Assembly district, represented by Democrat Cecilia Aguiar-Curry.

In the United States House of Representatives, Angwin is in California's 4th congressional district, represented by Democrat Mike Thompson.
