= Pacific Union College =

Seventh-day Adventist college in Angwin, California, US

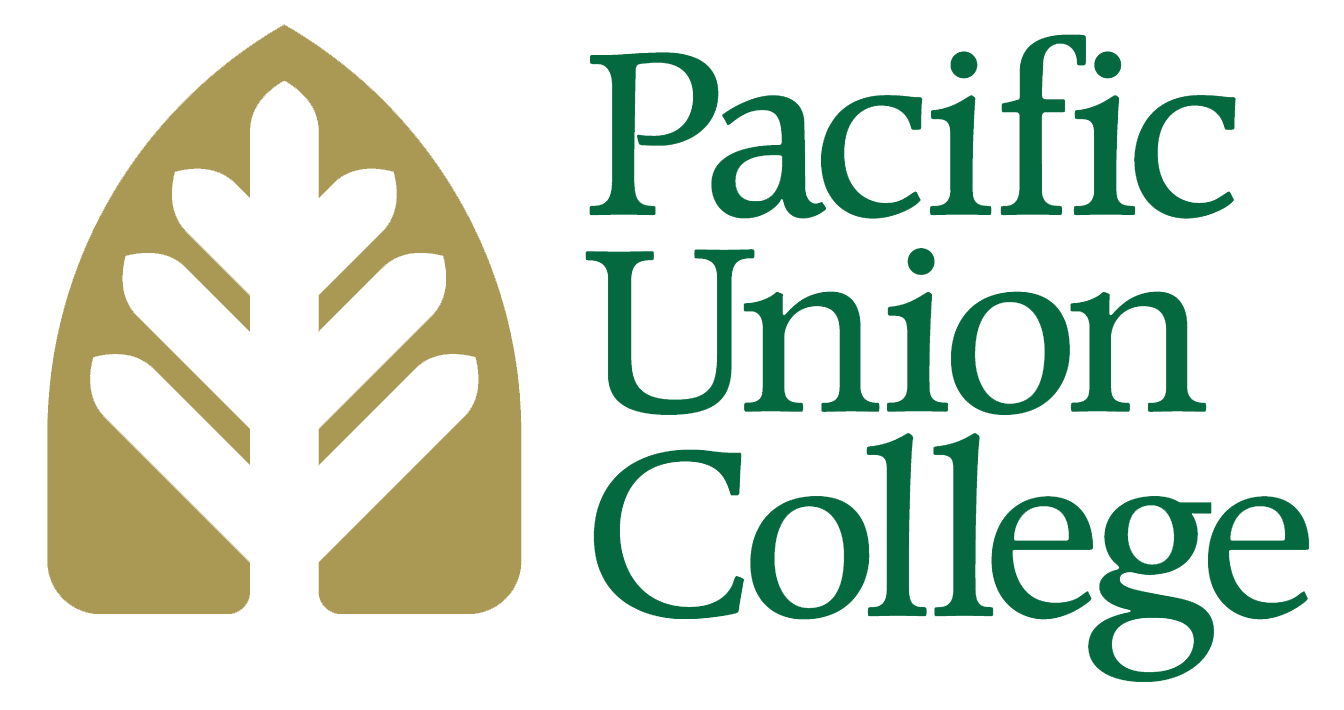
- Former names: Healdsburg Academy (1882–1899); Healdsburg College (1899–1906); Pacific College (1906–1910)
- Motto: They shall be all taught of God. (John 6:45)
- Type: Private liberal arts college
- Established: April 11, 1882; 144 years ago
- Religious affiliation: Seventh-day Adventist Church
- Academic affiliations: NAICU; CIC
- President: Ralph Trecartin
- Dean: Lindsay Hayasaka
- Academic staff: 65
- Students: 829 (2021–2022)
- Location: Angwin, California, United States; 38°34′9″N 122°26′27″W
- Campus: 1,800 acres (730 ha); Rural
- Student newspaper: Campus Chronicle
- Colors: Green & Gold
- Nickname: Pioneers
- Sporting affiliations: NAIA – Cal Pac
- Mascot: Pioneer Pete
- Website: www.puc.edu

Pacific Union College (PUC) is a private Seventh-day Adventist liberal arts college in Angwin, California. It is the only four-year college in Napa County, and the twelfth oldest institution of higher education in California. As a coeducational residential college with an almost exclusively undergraduate student body, most of those who attend the college are four-year students living on campus.

PUC is accredited by the WASC Senior College and University Commission and maintains various programmatic accreditation for specific programs. Enrollment at Pacific Union College is roughly 825. The college offers about 60 undergraduate majors and three master's programs organized in 25 academic departments, with its health science degrees the largest number of those sought out by students. The campus occupies 200 acres (0.81 km^{2}) of the college's 1,800 acres (7.3 km^{2}) in property.

== History ==
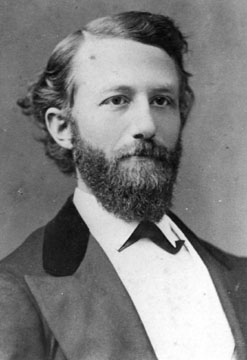
Sidney Brownsberger, PUC's first president

=== Early years (1882–1908) ===
Pacific Union College was founded as Healdsburg Academy in Healdsburg, California, in northern Sonoma County, in 1882. The creation of schools in the state was urged by Ellen G. White and other church leaders in an effort to accommodate the Adventist Church's growing membership on the West Coast and to train young Adventists for its work. The academy officially opened on April 11 of that year. It was the twelfth institution of higher education founded in California, and is the second founded by the Adventist Church, the first west of the Mississippi River.

Sidney Brownsberger served as its first President. Under his term, the academy focused on both conventional study of standard subjects as well as practical skills, such as dressmaking, blacksmithing, carpentry, and cooking, in line with White's desire for the college. The lengthy tenure of William C. Grainger saw the heyday of the academy's early years, but with the turn of the century, poor financial management led to increasing debt that eventually forced the academy to close in July 1908.

=== Move to Angwin (1909–1921) ===
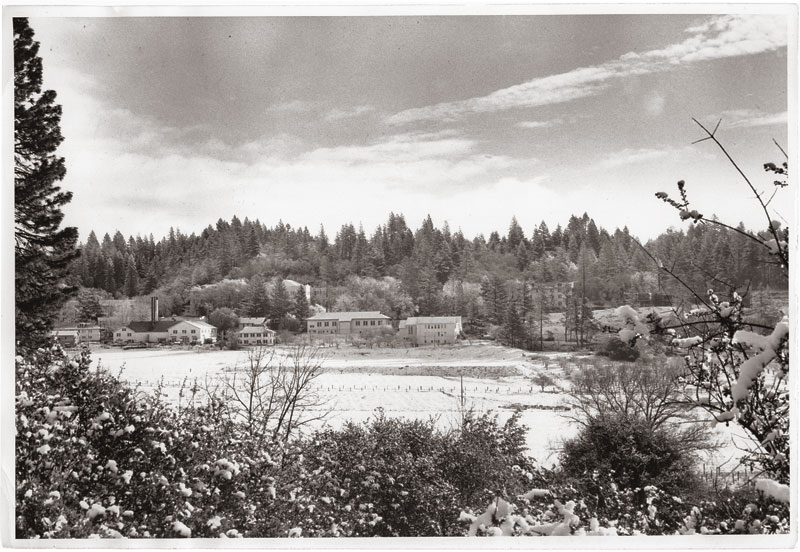
An early image of Pacific Union College's new campus in Angwin

Despite this failure, many church leaders – including White herself – continued to push for expanded Adventist schooling, and efforts were begun in the 1900s to find a new location to rebuild the college. Many sites were scouted out in the Central Valley and elsewhere within the state, but none came to the satisfaction of the searchers.

Eventually, in 1909, the Pacific Union Conference announced that it had found an opening to purchase the 1,636 acres of the Angwin Resort on Howell Mountain in neighboring Napa County. The property had been found through the church's St. Helena Sanitarium, and White visited the site in September in 1909. Satisfied with the condition of its facilities and living quarters and the ease with which they could be adapted for teaching purposes, its abundant resources in springs and lumber, and the healthful living its geography would provide, White approved the location. The property was bought in the same month for $60,000 (roughly $1.9 million in 2022), and opened its doors September 29. The name of the college was finalized as Pacific Union College in 1910 to reflect change in location, even as it had changed names a few times before.

PUC's first president at Angwin was Charles W. Irwin, who served from the opening of the new location until 1921. Irwin's term was marked by self-sufficiency as the college adapted to its new location, with both the faculty and student body working to expand the campus through the area's available natural resources.

=== Early 20th century (1922–1943) ===
In the 1920s and 1930s, PUC expanded its educational programs with the goal of receiving educational accreditation. Driven by suggestions from the college's board, PUC required that professors have postgraduate degrees to teach, created lower and upper divisions, introduced major and minor degrees, and necessitated the completion of senior theses for graduation. The college also extended funds to pay for faculty members' graduate studies. With these changes, PUC became the first Adventist college to become accredited when it was awarded accreditation by the Northwest Association of Secondary and Higher Schools in 1933.

This era also saw further expansion of the campus community through the construction of more facilities – including new men's dormitories and its current gymnasium – as well as through the creation of the college's first student association, the Associated Students of Pacific Union College (ASPUC), in January 1935. The college's student newspaper, the Campus Chronicle, published its first issue in 1925 after being adapted from the previous Mountain Echo, while the Diogenes Lantern, PUC's current yearbook, was first published in 1938.

With the United States' entry into World War II, over 400 male students and alumni were eventually drafted into military service.

=== Other history (1943–2023) ===
In 2006 the faculty, administration, and Board of Trustees underscored PUC's commitment to undergraduate education by making a formal decision to remain a college and not change its name to university, as other small private colleges had done.

In 2006, PUC's board of trustees made plans to transform the area into an ecovillage of several hundred settlements, in partnership with Triad Development, a Seattle-based construction firm. Although the college downscaled its original plans due to community opposition – primarily by Save Rural Angwin, a local NIMBY group – the board voted in October 2010 to sever its contract with Triad and cancel the project.

Pacific Union College has had a total of twenty-four presidents. The first eight of these served while the school was still in Healdsburg. In 1983, Malcolm Maxwell became the first alumnus to lead PUC, serving for a record 18 years. Ralph Trecartin, the current president, took office in July 2021 after serving as the associate provost and dean of the College of Professionals for Andrews University.

== Academics ==
Pacific Union College is the only four-year college located in Napa County, California. It offers around 60 undergraduate majors in various fields, along with other types of programs. Health science, business, and education are the leading fields in which students seek out degrees, and their degree programs are accredited by their respective accreditation bodies.

=== Curriculum ===
Pacific Union College offers 44 bachelor's degree programs, 10 associate degree programs, and three master's degree programs, in addition to minors, credential programs, pre-professional tracks, and an honors program. These are all organized throughout 25 academic departments. The school operates on a quarter-based academic calendar.

Though the range of its offerings is quite broad, PUC's most prominent programs are those in the health sciences, which are sought out by a considerable number of those who attend. In the 2020–2021 school year, two-thirds of all undergraduate degrees awarded were in the medical field, and 96% of the associate degrees awarded were for nursing.

PUC maintains an especially close connection to Loma Linda University School of Medicine, another Adventist institution, and most of the college's pre-professional programs are meant specifically for admission into Loma Linda. The college has sent a steady stream of students to the university for several decades; visiting from Loma Linda in 1925, John H. Kellogg noted that PUC was "the college that sends the largest number of medical students from any one place." Degrees in business and education follow behind as the second two most sought after.

Similar to its emphasis on manual labor and physical health in its Healdsburg days, PUC necessitates that students takes fitness classes as part of its general education requirements. Offerings in the past have included fencing, trikke, pickleball, swimming, water aerobics, polo, canoeing, skiing, snowboarding, soccer, dance, and yoga, though some of these have since been discontinued.

Similar to other Adventist schools, PUC offers study-abroad programs through Adventist Colleges Abroad (ACA), primarily in Europe and Latin America. Most of these programs were designed for those seeking degrees from the college's World Languages Department, though non-language majors often study abroad through the ACA as well. PUC also organizes mission trips independently of ACA.

=== Rankings ===
At the start of the 2023–2024, the U.S. News & World Report ranked Pacific Union College the 13th best regional college in the Western United States, the 12th top performer in social mobility (a position it shares with the Fashion Institute of Design & Merchandising), and the second Best Value School. In the same year, the New York Times ranked PUC the 8th most economically diverse college in the U.S. Niche gives the college an overall B− score, and ranks it the 24th most diverse college in California, with its diversity graded A+. It also ranks PUC as the 14th best nursing college in California.

In 2024, Washington Monthly ranked Pacific Union College 35th among 223 colleges that award almost exclusively bachelor's degrees in the U.S. based on its contribution to the public good, as measured by social mobility, research, and promoting public service.

=== Accreditation ===
Pacific Union College has been accredited by the WASC Senior College and University Commission or its predecessor since 1951. In February 2020, however, the commission issued a formal Notice of Concern regarding the college's accreditation, citing PUC's dwindling financial resources and dramatic drops in enrollment as areas that needed improvement. Though in the years following PUC noted moderate increases in enrollment and dismissed a number of its employees in response to WSCUC's recommendations, the commission has not withdrawn its Notice of Concern. PUC is also accredited by the Adventist Church's own Adventist Accrediting Association. (Note: Because the Adventist Accrediting Association is not recognized by the U.S. Department of Education, this accreditation is a mark of the church's approval of PUC's programs rather than government-recognized accreditation.)

In addition to these two institution-wide accreditations, many of PUC's programs and departments are accredited or approved by their respective programmatic accreditation bodies, including:

- National Association of Schools of Art and Design
- National Association of Schools of Music
- California Commission on Teacher Credentialing (Note: Similar to WASC's "accreditation with Notice of Concern," the Commission has given the education program "accreditation with stipulations." The Commission is also not federally.)
- International Assembly for Collegiate Business Education
- Council on Social Work Education
- Accrediting Commission for Education in Nursing

== Campus and facilities ==
The college is located in Angwin, on Howell Mountain overlooking the Napa Valley, 70 miles (110 km) north of San Francisco and 60 miles (85 km) from the Pacific Ocean. The main campus comprises about only 200 acres (0.81 km^{2}) of the college's 1,800 acres (7.3 km^{2}) in property. The remaining 1,600 acres (6.5 km^{2}) is managed as a conservation easement.

Since 2007, Bon Appétite has catered the PUC Dining Commons. It serves exclusively vegetarian and vegan menu items sourced from local producers, in accordance with Adventist health beliefs and the company's own catering methods. During winter 2011, the Commons saw heavy renovations which redesigned the cafeteria's architectural style and expanded its space. In 2021, supply chain shortages caused by COVID-19 disrupted the kitchen's ability to source local ingredients.

The college's main library is the Nelson Memorial Library, with holdings of around 150,000 books. It also houses the Pitcairn Islands Study Center, with a collection of materials about the Pitcairn Islands, as well as literary collections for various figures in Adventist history. In 2011, the library was renovated at a cost of over a million dollars.

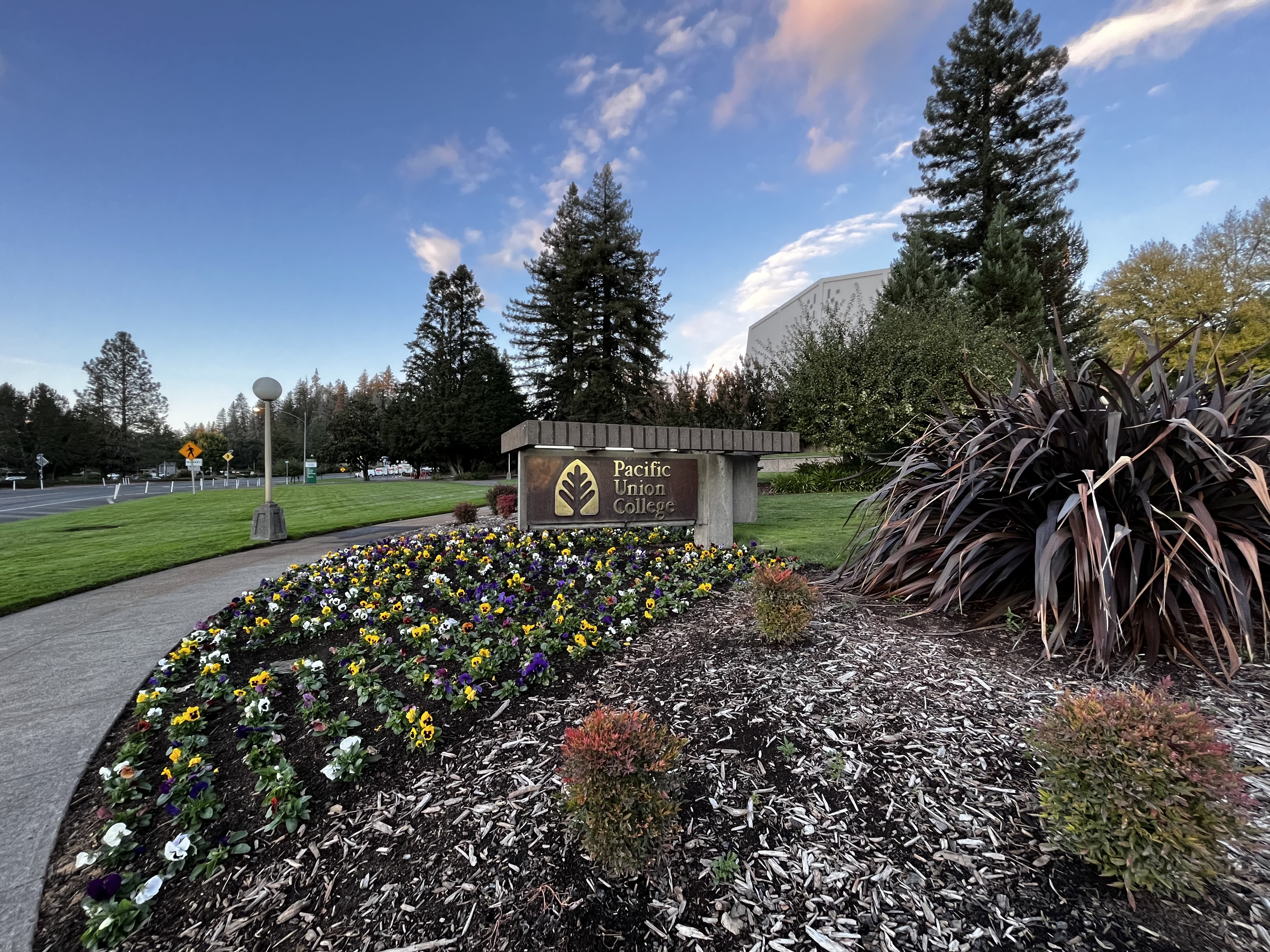
Entrance sign at the front of PUC's campus.

=== Albion Field Station ===
The college owns as operates the Albion Field Station, in Mendocino County, on the Albion River by the Pacific coast. Though the station was designed for educational purposes, and PUC's biology department makes use of the river's tide pools and estuaries for course learning, its cabins and other facilities have made it a center of broader student life, and sees visits from other departments.

=== Angwin–Parrett Field ===
Pacific Union College owns and operates Angwin–Parrett Field, a public use airport located on its campus. The airport was the landing spot during George W. Bush's presidential visit to the Napa Valley in 2006. The airport also supports PUC's Bachelor of Science degree in aviation and offers ground schools and flight instruction to the community.

=== PUC Forest ===
Much of the school's undeveloped acreage is managed as the PUC Demonstration & Experimental Forest, though on campus it has sometimes been called the Back 40. The forest was part of the Angwin property and a site of lumber before it was bought by the college. It spans roughly 1,600 acres (6.5 km^{2}). In addition to providing the resources necessary for the expansion of the campus in its early years, the forest has also served as a site for biological research and preservation, enclosing as it does unique species and biodiversity.

In 2018, PUC partnered with the Napa County Land Trust to preserve the forest as a conservation easement; the easement is currently held by CalFire. Covering 864 acres (3.50 km^{2}), the easement protects about half of college's total property. It was valued at $7.1 million, much of it due to vineyard potential. Attempts in the past have been made to develop or sell the land, however; most notably, the college made plans to transform the area into an ecovillage in 2006, but it ultimately chose to cancel the project.

Still, with a network of hiking trails spanning 35 miles, the forest sees regular use. In 2019, the college partnered with Napa County's Open Space District to open its trail network to the public. The forest is also a section along the Bay Area Ridge Trail, and was linked in the same year. The 2009 Tour of California, an cycling race held within the state, raced through PUC.

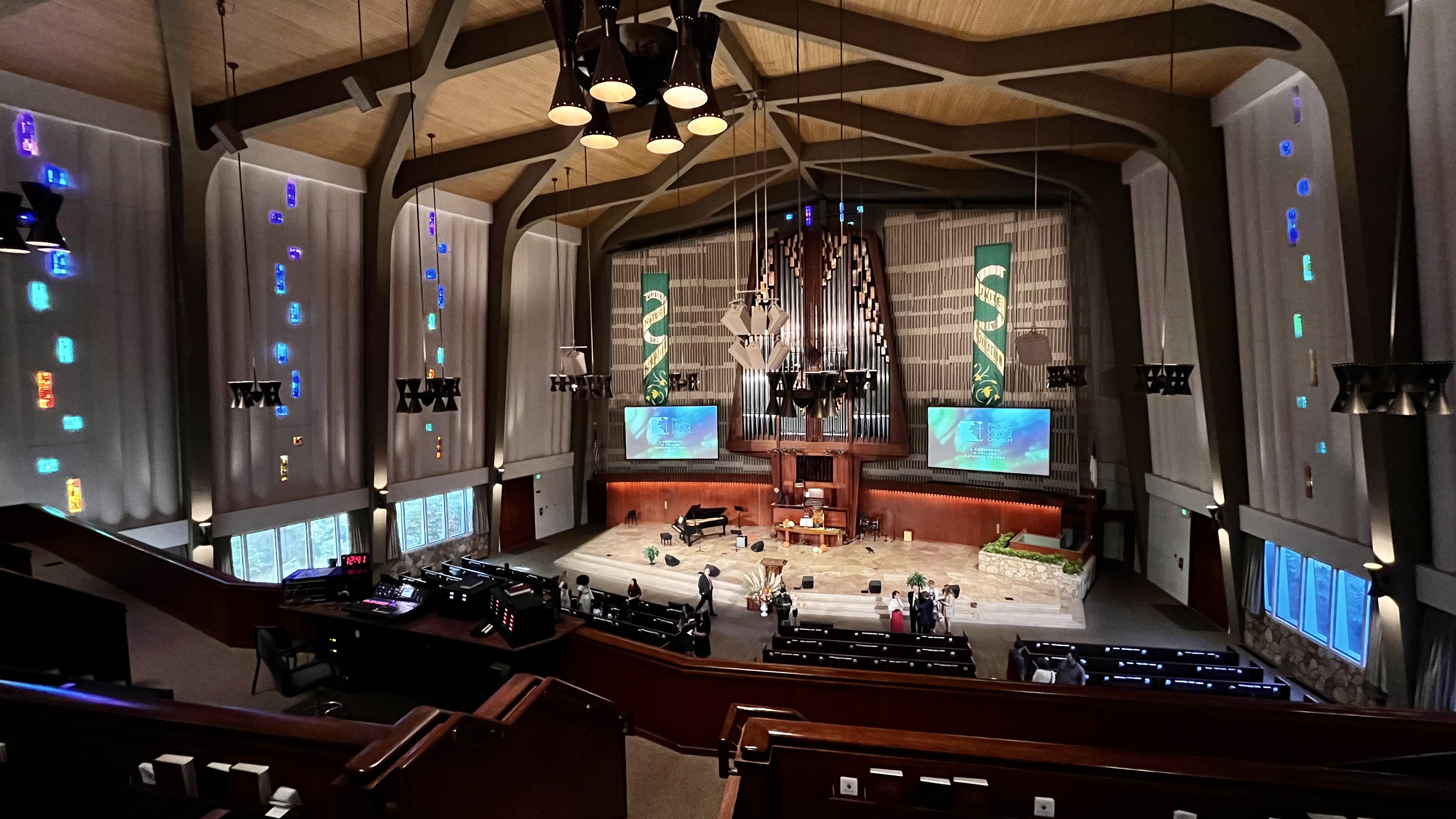
The PUC Church Sanctuary in October 2022.

=== Pacific Union College Church ===
Pacific Union College Church is the campus church, built in 1968. It has around 1,600 members. The church's large pipe organ was built by Austrian organ-maker Rieger Orgelbau and installed in 1981. The church complex also has classrooms for theology classes and houses PUC's Office of Service, Justice, and Missions.

== Student life ==
Pacific Union College's stated focus is on undergraduate education. In the fall of 2021, 829 students were enrolled at PUC, 825 of whom were undergraduate students. The school maintains a student/teacher ratio of roughly 12:1. As a residential college, the vast majority of these students live in one of seven on-campus residence halls.

=== Demographics ===
Within PUC's student body, the three largest ethnic demographics are Hispanic (31% in fall 2021), Asian (23%), and White (21%), while the remaining quarter includes Black students and others. Female students make up a majority of those on campus (63%), while male students comprise about a third (37%). A large majority of students are from California (78%), with only a fraction enrolling from out of state. PUC was ranked as the most diverse liberal arts college in the Western United States by the U.S. News & World Report for the 2022–2023 school year.

PUC also maintains a DEI Council as well as a Title IX Office. It accepts the WSCUC criteria for diversity: race, ethnicity, socioeconomic class, gender, age, religious belief, sexual orientation and disability.

=== Student association ===
The Pacific Union College Student Association (PUCSA) was started in 1887, just five years after the college was founded. It consists of an executive branch and a Student Senate. PUCSA funds publication of the school's student-run newspaper, the Campus Chronicle, and the college yearbook, the Diogenes Lantern.

=== Student organizations ===
There are more than 50 clubs, Honor's Associations and Student Ministries active on campus at Pacific Union College. These include the Secular Student Alliance, Biology Club, Asian Student Association, Pre-Med Club, Korean Adventist Student Association, Dramatic Arts Society, Musical Arts Symposium, Homeless Ministry, Psi Chi, College Democrats and others. In addition to the Campus Chronicle, there are several other student-run publications including a literary periodical, Quicksilver.

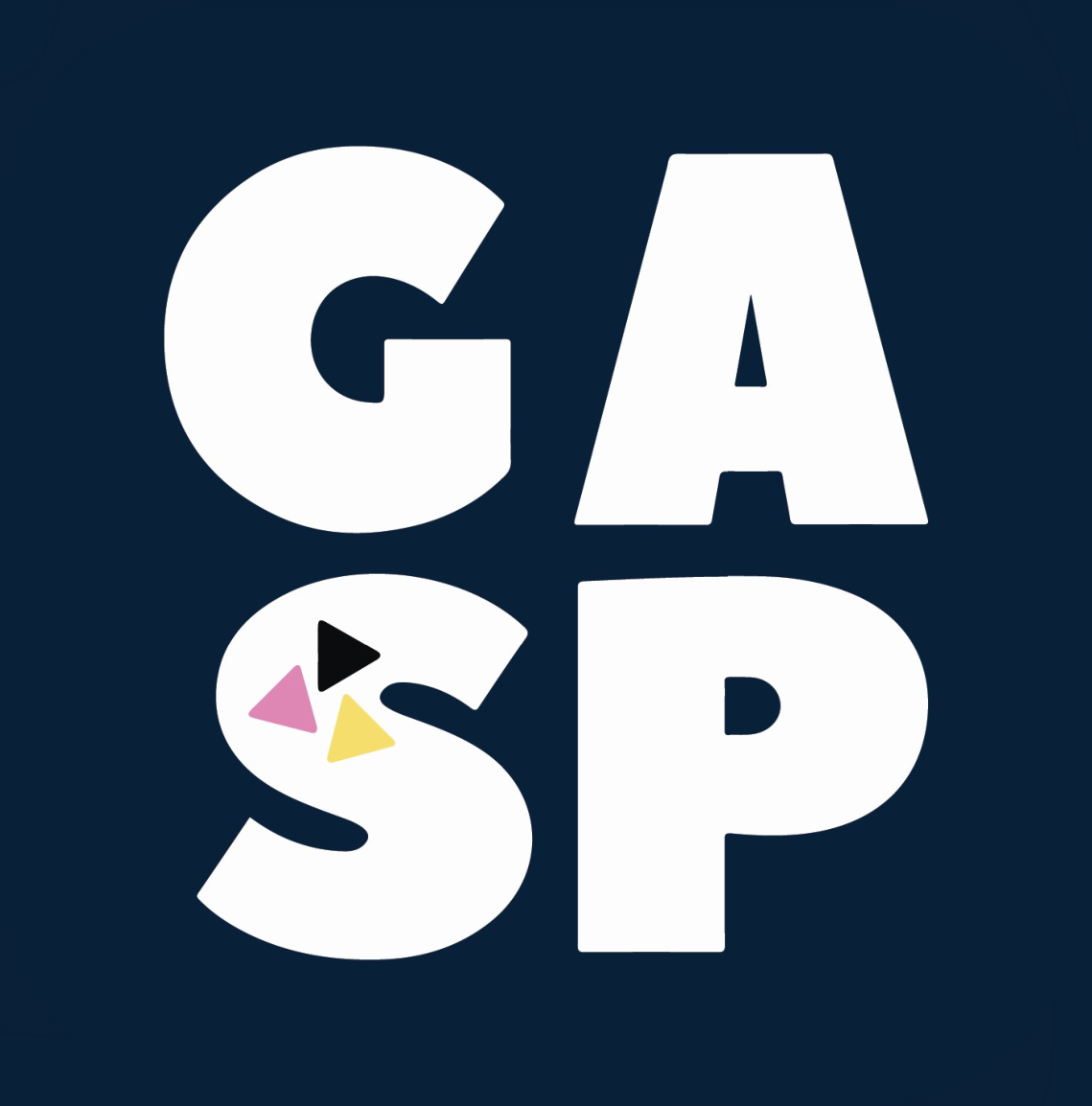
The logo of Gay and Straight People (GASP) in the early 2020s.

==== Gay and Straight People ====
A gay-straight alliance, Gay and Straight People (GASP), has operated on campus since October 2008. It was first organized by a pre-med student named Jonathan Heldt, who established the alliance when he was a senior in the hopes of creating a support group for LGBTQ students and their allies. Originally intending to form an official club, Heldt's proposal was rejected by PUC's Advisory Council.

Students and faculty continue to meet regularly to discuss LGBTQ issues. Though the club remains formally unrecognized by the college, the group contributed to the expansion of all-gender bathrooms on campus, and has had presence at the college's student orientation and club fairs. In December 2022, the Student Senate passed a bill calling for GASP's recognition as an official club, though it has yet to be addressed by administration.

== Athletics ==
The Pacific Union athletic teams are called the Pioneers. The college is a member of the National Association of Intercollegiate Athletics (NAIA), primarily competing in the California Pacific Conference (CalPac) since the 1996–97 academic year.

Pacific Union competes in eight intercollegiate sports: Men's sports include basketball, cross country, soccer and volleyball; while women's sports include basketball, cross country, soccer and volleyball.

=== Accomplishments ===
PUC has been awarded the "California Pacific Conference Team Sportsmanship Award" five times since 2003, most recently for the 2010–2011 school year. In fall 2011, the coaches for varsity women's volleyball and men's soccer described it as "rebuilding" time. This award signifies the school that displays outstanding sportsmanship and exemplifies the true spirit of the "Champions of Character" program set forth by the NAIA.

=== Intramurals ===
PUC maintains an active intramural athletic program under the name RecRadio.org. The intramural athletic program is the top intramural athletics program in the country according to College Prowler's "Best Intramural Sports" ranking.

== Alumni ==
Pacific Union College has been described as a "training ground for an inordinately large number of outstanding physicians, dentists, nurses, teachers and theologians" who make up its 50,000 alumni. A large majority of students who graduate from the college do so with degrees in the health sciences. Most of PUC's notable alumni include individuals in academic administration or political offices, though some have been recognized in other fields.

== Notable faculty ==
- Terrence Roberts (1975 to 1977), one of the Little Rock Nine
