= Robert H. Pierson =

American Seventh-day Adventist leader

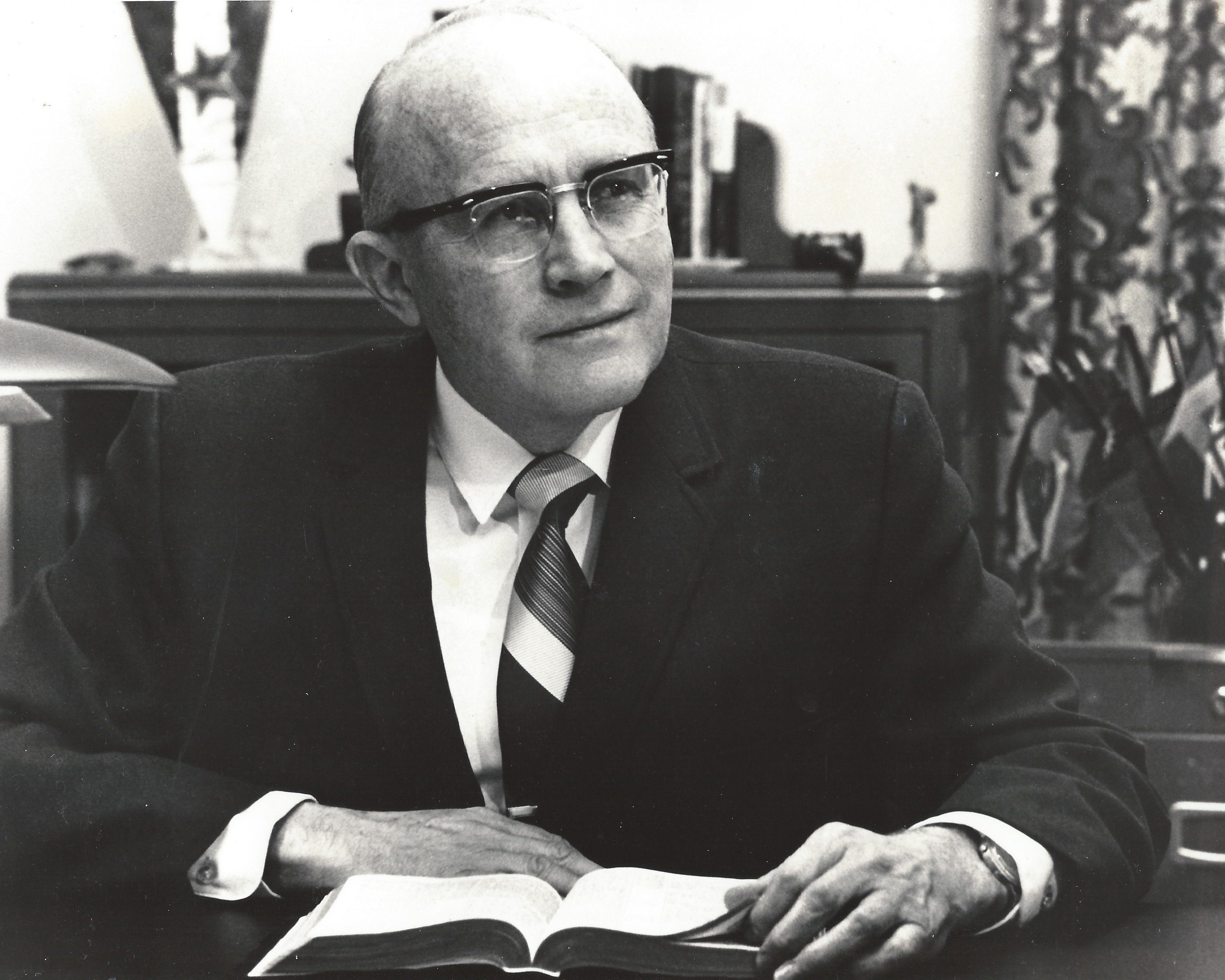

16th President of the General Conference of Seventh day Adventists
- In office 1966–1979
- Preceded by: Reuben Richard Figuhr
- Succeeded by: Neal C. Wilson

Personal details
- Born: January 3 1911 Brooklyn, Iowa
- Died: January 21 1989 (aged 78) Kailua, Hawaii
- Cause of death: Heart attack
- Profession: Pastor

Robert Howard Pierson (3 January 1911 – 21 January 1989) was an American president of the General Conference of Seventh-day Adventists during the 12½−year period of June 16, 1966, to January 3, 1979. While in the line of duty, Pierson served in North America, Asia and Africa. He interacted with 3 U.S. Presidents and the Presidents or Prime Ministers of 8 foreign countries, plus many governors, mayors, and other governmental dignitaries. He received an Honorary Doctor of Divinity degree from Andrews University, Berrien Springs, Michigan in the United States. Pierson was one of the longest-serving church presidents, which include A. G. Daniels, Ted N.C. Wilson, and James Lamar McElhany.

== Biography ==
After graduating from Southern Junior College, Collegedale, Tennessee, in August 1933, Pierson’s first assignment was a pastor-teacher position in the Columbus and Albany churches in southwestern Georgia. From there he was transferred to the Home Missionary Department of the Georgia-Cumberland Conference. In 1935, the Pierson family began a seven-year term of service in India, first as pastor of the Bombay English-speaking church, then as superintendent of the Tamil Mission in South India, and president of the South India Union Mission in Bangalore. In 1939, while in India, he was ordained as a minister of the Adventist church. In 1942, during the Second World War, Pierson returned to the United States with his family where he served as pastor of the Seventh-day Adventist Church in Takoma Park, Maryland. From there he moved to New York City, where he was the speaker of the nightly program Bible Auditorium of the Air over a 50,000-watt commercial station. Pierson’s next assignment was in the Inter-American Division where he served as president of the British West Indies Union (1944−1947) in Mandeville, Jamaica; president of the Caribbean Union (1947−1950) in Port of Spain, Trinidad. In 1950 he became president of the Southern Asia Division (1950–1954), in Pune, India. In 1954 he returned to the United States and served as president of the Kentucky-Tennessee Conference (1954–1957), in Nashville, Tennessee, and president of the Texas Conference (1957–1958), in Fort Worth, Texas. In 1958, he was transferred to Africa where he became president of the Southern Africa Division (1958–1962), and the Trans-African Division (1962–1966), both in Harare, Zimbabwe; and ultimately, president of the General Conference (1966–1979) in Takoma Park, Washington, D.C. Aside from busy administrative assignments, Pierson’s love for evangelism led him to conduct evangelistic meetings as often as his schedule permitted.

== Personal Information ==
Pierson was born on January 3, 1911, in Brooklyn, Iowa, US. He completed his secondary education at Summerfield Highschool in Summerfield, Florida, his tertiary studies were completed at Southern Junior College in Collegedale, Tennessee, in 1933. He married Dollis Mae Smith of Ocala, Florida in 1931. They have two sons, John D. Pierson and Robert G. Pierson. He died on January 21, 1989, in Kailua, Hawaii, while serving as the interim pastor of the Kailua SDA Church.

== Publications ==
Pierson was a prolific writer, both of prose and poetry. His biography Radiant With Hope lists him as author of 28 books, many of them translated into multiple languages, as well as hundreds of articles. He wrote many stories and devotional works. Journals, such as the Youth Instructor, a journal for Adventist youth (now discontinued), published his essays. In 1955, a seven part series entitled Forbidden Lands and Strange Places, Pierson described his travel to Afghanistan.

== Books published ==
- 1948. The Road to Happiness
- 1948. Wonderful Jesus
- 1951. Triumphs of the cross in lands afar
- 1953. Paddles over the Kamarang; the story of the Davis Indians with Joseph O Emmerson
- 1958. The Secret of Happiness
- 1959. Give Us This Day
- 1965. 501 Adventist illustrations and stories
- 1966. So, you want to be a leader! : a spiritual, human relations and promotional approach to church leadership and administration
- 1966. The final countdown with G S Stevenson
- 1966. What shall I speak about? : 250 suggestions and helps in preparing talks and sermons for many occasions
- 1967. Faith on tiptoe; glimpses into the simple dynamics of practical Christian living
- 1968. Though the winds blow; a daily guide to successful living
- 1968. Road to True Riches. [On interpreting the Bible. With plates.]
- 1970. Heart to Heart
- 1974. Revival and Reformation
- 1974. Faith Triumphant
- 1975. We Still Believe
- 1975. Angels Over Elisabethville: A True Story of God's Providence in Time of War
- 1976. Good-bye, planet Earth
- 1977. In Step with Jesus
- 1978. How to become a successful Christian leader
- 1978. What's just ahead with Don Short
- 1978. Beloved leaders : inspirational essays on Seventh-Day Adventist Christian leadership
- 1983. Miracles Happen Every Day
- 1984. Here Comes Adventure
- 1987. Love Come Home
- 1989. The role of the spirit of prophecy in preparing God's people for earth's final events with Ellen G. White Estate, Inc.

== See also ==
- General Conference of Seventh-day Adventists
- Seventh-day Adventist Church
- Seventh-day Adventist theology
- Seventh-day Adventist eschatology
- History of the Seventh-day Adventist Church

| Preceded by Reuben Richard Figuhr | President of the General Conference of Seventh-day Adventists; 1966 – 1979 | Succeeded by Neal C. Wilson |
