= Charles H. Watson =

Australian Seventh-day Adventist minister and administrator

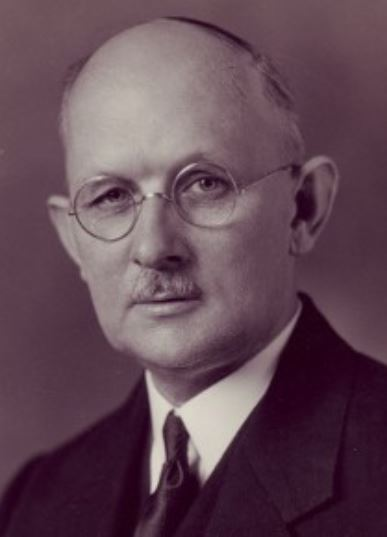

12th President of the General Conference of Seventh day Adventists
- In office 1930–1936
- Preceded by: William A. Spicer
- Succeeded by: James Lamar McElhany

Personal details
- Born: 8 October 1877
- Died: 24 December 1962 (aged 85)
- Profession: Pastor

Charles H. Watson (8 October 1877 – 24 December 1962) was a Seventh-day Adventist minister and administrator. He was President of the General Conference from 1930 to 1936.

Watson was born in Australia on 8 October 1877 to a farming family who lived near Yambuk, Victoria.

On 23 March 1898 he married his neighbor and childhood sweetheart, Elizabeth Mary Shanks. In 1900 his family was introduced to Seventh-day Adventist doctrines. Charles resisted accepting these doctrines until 1902, when he found no biblical support for Sunday observance and was baptized by W. A. Hennig. Watson had been a successful wool buyer, but quit the business in 1907 to attend Australasian Missionary College in order to study for the ministry. He graduated from this school in 1909 and was ordained into Seventh-day Adventist ministry on 14 September 1912.

Watson was appointed president of the Queensland Conference. He was succeeded in this position in 1914 by Edwin Butz. His business sense and aptitude for remembering names and faces had gained him a reputation for administrative skill, and in 1915 he was elected president of the Australasian Union Conference. During this time he preached in Australia, Fiji, Tahiti, and the United States of America.

From 1922 until 1926 he served as vice-president and associate treasurer of the General Conference of Seventh-Day Adventists.

He returned to North America in 1930 to attend the General Conference Session, where he was elected President of the General Conference, in no small part due to his financial ability. He directed the Adventist church during a time of budget-cutting and consolidation, while accomplishing a period of denominational growth.

When his term ended in 1936, he returned to Queensland, Australia, where he assumed the duties of vice-president of the Australasian Division and president of the Australasian Union Conference. He retired in 1944. He died on 24 December 1962 at Sydney Sanitarium and Hospital, and was buried in Northern Suburbs Cemetery in Sydney, Australia.

== See also ==
- General Conference of Seventh-day Adventists
- Seventh-day Adventist Church
- Seventh-day Adventist theology
- Seventh-day Adventist eschatology
- History of the Seventh-day Adventist Church

Preceded by William Ambrose Spicer	President of the General Conference of Seventh-day Adventists; 1930 - 1936	Succeeded by James Lamar McElhany
