= Neal C. Wilson =

American Seventh-day Adventist minister (1920–2010)

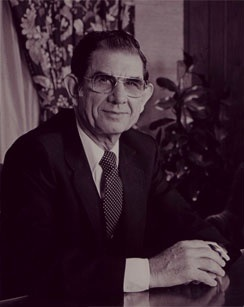

17th President of the General Conference of Seventh day Adventists
- In office 1979–1990
- Preceded by: Robert H. Pierson
- Succeeded by: Robert S. Folkenberg

Personal details
- Born: 5 July 1920 Lodi, California
- Died: 14 December 2010 (aged 90) Dayton, Maryland
- Profession: Pastor

Neal Clayton Wilson (July 5, 1920 – December 14, 2010) served as the president of the General Conference of the Seventh-day Adventist Church from 1979 to 1990. Wilson was head of the North American Division when elected on January 3, 1979, to take the place of the ailing former General Conference president Robert Pierson, who had resigned for reasons of health.

He was succeeded as General Conference President on July 6, 1990, by Robert Folkenberg, who was then the president of the Carolina Conference of Seventh-day Adventists. Wilson died December 14, 2010. He was 90 years old.

== Biography ==
Neal C. Wilson was president of the General Conference of Seventh-day Adventists from 1979 to 1990. He received his elementary and secondary education, plus two years of college, in Zambia, Malawi, South Africa, and India. These were countries where his father served the Seventh-day Adventist Church in pastoral and administrative posts. Wilson is an alumnus of Pacific Union College in Angwin, California.

Neal C. Wilson's son, Ted N. C. Wilson, would follow his father's footsteps and become the president of the General Conference of Seventh-day Adventists from 2010 until 2025.

== Presidency ==
As president, Wilson furthered the church's mission in the former Soviet Union two years before the fall of communism there, helping obtain permission to establish an Adventist seminary and administrative headquarters near Moscow in 1987. He also oversaw the 1980 adoption of the church's Fundamental Beliefs, the creation of Adventist World Radio, and oversaw the relocation of the denomination's world headquarters from Takoma Park, Maryland to its current location in Silver Spring.

During his tenure, Wilson visited 170 countries where the church operated institutions of healthcare, education, evangelism and publishing. He was known to remember thousands of people, even after brief meetings.

"I regard him as one of the outstanding leaders in the history of this church," said Bill Johnsson, former editor of the Adventist Review. "I asked him once how he remembered people's names so well and he said he just made a point of it."

After retirement in 1990, Wilson served as an adviser to the denomination's Euro-Asia Division. The U.S. Department of State would periodically call him regarding situations in the Middle East based on his understanding of the region from a 15-year post in Egypt, Johnsson said.

"He could have been a statesman or a diplomat but he chose to give his talents to the church and we were all blessed by that," Johnsson said.

Wilson served the church in Egypt from 1944 to 1958, first as a pastor and evangelist and later as the regional administrative president. He then worked as an administrator in California and Maryland before his appointment as president of the church's North American Division in 1966. He served in the post until his appointment as president of the denomination.

== Crisis ==
Neal C. Wilson also appointed the Sanctuary Review Committee which was a group of biblical scholars and administrators which met to decide the church's response to theologian Desmond Ford, who had challenged details of the church's "investigative judgment" teaching. The meeting was held from 11–15 August 1980, at the Glacier View Ranch, a church-owned spiritual retreat and conference centre in Colorado, United States. Although the group produced and voted a Consensus Statement which Ford agreed to, Wilson ignored it and drew up a separate document emphasizing points of disagreement, which was circulated to administrators present only. As a result, Desmond Ford's credentials were revoked and was the cause of much controversy in the church, and the church experienced the largest exit of teachers and ministers in its history. One modern commentator describes 'Glacier View' as "Adventist shorthand for pain, dissension and division".

== See also ==
- General Conference of Seventh-day Adventists
- Seventh-day Adventist Church
- Seventh-day Adventist theology
- Seventh-day Adventist eschatology
- History of the Seventh-day Adventist Church

Preceded by Robert H. Pierson	President of the General Conference of Seventh-day Adventists; 1979–1990	Succeeded by Robert S. Folkenberg
