= Robert S. Folkenberg =

Puerto Rican Seventh-day adventist

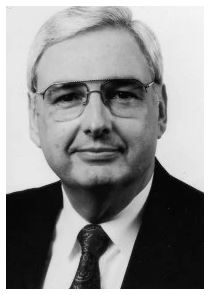

18th President of the General Conference of Seventh day Adventists
- In office July 6, 1990 – February 8, 1999
- Preceded by: Neal C. Wilson
- Succeeded by: Jan Paulsen

Personal details
- Born: Robert Stanley Folkenberg; January 1, 1941 Santurce, Puerto Rico
- Died: 24 December 2015 (aged 74) Winter Haven, Florida, U.S.
- Profession: Pastor

Robert Stanley Folkenberg (January 1, 1941 – December 24, 2015) was an American pastor who served as General Conference president of the Seventh-day Adventist Church from 1990 through to his resignation in 1999. His tenure was marked by an unprecedented growth in church membership and his “Global Mission initiative” in the Adventist Church. He was forced to resign for fraud and misappropriation of funds. During his tenure as the President, he worked within the laity of the church through worldwide programs through ShareHim/Global Evangelism.

== Biography ==
Folkenberg was born in Santurce, Puerto Rico on 1 January 1941 to North American missionaries serving in Latin America and Central America. Folkenberg's education up to Grade 4 took place in Puerto Rico, before attending schools in Cuba, entering high school in California and completing high school in Milo, Oregon in 1958. The next year, Folkenberg enrolled in Atlantic Union College where he remained for one year before a one-year stint at Newbold College. In 1962, Folkenberg graduated from Andrews University and obtained his master's degree in New Testament theology from Andrews in 1963.

Prior to his election as General Conference President in 1990, Folkenberg served as President of the Carolina Conference.

His move in 1998 to establish a "Board of Ministerial and Theological Education" in every Division of the church was criticised and put on hold.

He championed the vision of a “Global Mission initiative” in the Adventist Church. An expected long tenure as president was cut short by his decision to resign amid allegations of financial impropriety in his personal life. His decision was not an admission of guilt but rather an expression of concern that the church not be marred by his cooperation in the investigation. A Christianity Today article says "During his presidency, Folkenberg, known for a somewhat brusque management style, shook up the denomination, spearheading mass communications initiatives that have led to massive growth in membership". According to Lawrence Geraty, then president of La Sierra University, while Folkenberg "never asked anyone to do what he himself was not willing to do," his style raised hackles.

Folkenberg was married to Anita Emmerson and they had two children, Robert and Kathi. He died just before his 75th birthday on December 24, 2015, from a recurrence of colon cancer, at his home in Winter Haven, Florida, surrounded by family.

=== Financial improprieties ===
Robert Folkenberg had business dealings with James Moore, who was convicted of grand-theft felony in 1987. On August 21, 1998, Moore sued Folkenberg, the General Conference Corporation, and the Inter-America Division, alleging that Folkenberg had stolen 8,000,000 dollars from him. The suit was settled out of court on February 26, 1999. Meetings were held by ADCOM on January 27, and 28 of that year, questioning Folkenberg on his dealings. They asked him to resign, but he refused. Finally on February 8, 1999, he resigned his position as president of the General Conference of Seventh-day Adventists.

== See also ==
- General Conference of Seventh-day Adventists
- Seventh-day Adventist Church
- Seventh-day Adventist theology
- Seventh-day Adventist eschatology
- History of the Seventh-day Adventist Church

Preceded by Neal C. Wilson	President of the General Conference of Seventh-day Adventists; 1990 – 1999	Succeeded by Jan Paulsen
