= Reuben Richard Figuhr =

American Seventh-day Adventist administrator

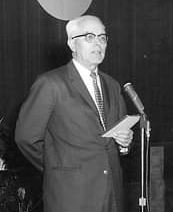

15th President of the General Conference of Seventh day Adventists
- In office 1954–1966
- Preceded by: William Henry Branson
- Succeeded by: Robert H. Pierson

Personal details
- Born: October 20, 1896 Superior, Wisconsin, US
- Died: October 28, 1983 (aged 87) Napa, California, US
- Profession: Pastor

Reuben Richard Figuhr was the 15th president of the Seventh-day Adventist Church General Conference. He was born in Superior, Wisconsin, United States on October 20, 1896. He served as Adventist president from 1954 to 1966. He married May Belle Holt. Figuhr. He died in Napa, California on October 28, 1983.

== Biography ==
Reuben Richard Figuhr was born of Prussian descent on October 20, 1896, in Wisconsin. He served in the Philippines and then as the president of the South American Division, and then at the age of 58, just a year before the evangelical conferences, Figuhr became president of the General Conference (1954–1966). He became embroiled in a controversy over the publishing of Questions on Doctrine which became the centerpiece event of his administration. At times he was frustrated by how far Le Roy Edwin Froom and M. L. Andreasen were going into the debate over the book. But he stood behind it.

He married May Belle Holt Figuhr. He died in Napa, California, on October 28, 1983.

== See also ==
- History of the Seventh-day Adventist Church
- General Conference of Seventh-day Adventists
- Seventh-day Adventist Church

Preceded by William Henry Branson	President of the General Conference of Seventh-day Adventists; 1954 – 1966	Succeeded by Robert H. Pierson
