= William Henry Branson =

American Seventh-day Adventist missionary

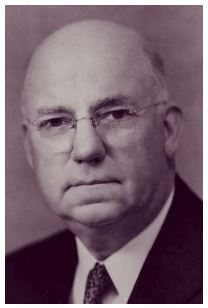

14th President of the General Conference of Seventh day Adventists
- In office 1950–1954
- Preceded by: James Lamar McElhany
- Succeeded by: Reuben Richard Figuhr

Personal details
- Born: 1887
- Died: 1961 (aged 73–74)
- Profession: Pastor

William Henry Branson (1887 – 1961) was a Seventh-day Adventist minister and administrator who served as the President of the General Conference of Seventh-Day Adventists from 1950 to 1954.

He began denominational service as a colporteur in 1906, and as an evangelist in 1908. In 1911 he was conference president in South Carolina and then in Tennessee. By 1915 he was president of the former Southeastern Union Conference. In 1920 Branson was called as a missionary to Africa, where he organized the division and administered it from 1920 to 1930. He then served as vice-president of the General Conference from 1930 to 1946. From 1946 to 1950 he gave leadership to the denomination's work in China during a time of "great perplexity." In 1950 Branson was elected to the highest administrative post in the Seventh-day Adventist Church, president of the General Conference. Among his notable achievements was organizing the 1952 Bible Conference.

Helderberg College of Higher Education (1893), the first College of the Seventh-day Adventist Church established outside the US, named the administration building "Branson Hall" in honour of Branson who was president of the South African Division at the time when the college moved to its present site in 1928. The Branson Site of North York General Hospital in Toronto, Ontario, Canada is named for Branson. Originally the Seventh-Day Adventist Hospital and then North York Branson Hospital, it was amalgamated with the public North York General Hospital during a period of hospital consolidation in Ontario in 1997.

== Books ==
- Pioneering in the Lion Country
- The Way to Christ
- Missionary Adventures in Africa
- The Holy Spirit
- In Defense of the Faith
- How Men are Saved
- Drama of the Ages

== See also ==
- History of the Seventh-day Adventist Church
- General Conference of Seventh-day Adventists
- Seventh-day Adventist Church

Preceded by James Lamar McElhany	President of the General Conference of Seventh-day Adventists; 1950 – 1954	Succeeded by Reuben Richard Figuhr
