= List of presidents of the General Conference of Seventh-day Adventists =

The president of the General Conference is the head of the General Conference of Seventh-day Adventists, the governing body of the Seventh-day Adventist Church. The president's office is within the offices of the General Conference, located in Silver Spring, Maryland. As of July 2025, the current president is Erton Köhler.

Traditionally, the post has been held by an American. Of the 18 presidents, 13 were born in the United States, 1 born in Puerto Rico to North American missionaries, 1 born in Brazil, 1 born in Australia and 2 born in Norway, of whom one emigrated to the U.S. at age 5. In all, 18 individuals have served 21 presidencies spanning 162 years.

== Presidents of the General Conference of Seventh-day Adventists ==
No.	Portrait	President	Took office	Left office	Length
1		John Byington (1798 – 1887)	20 March 1863	17 May 1865	2 years, 58 days
2		James Springer White (4 August 1821 – 6 August 1881)	17 May 1865	14 May 1867	1 year, 362 days
3		John Nevins Andrews (22 July 1829 – 21 October 1883)	14 May 1867	18 May 1869	2 years, 4 days
4		James Springer White (4 August 1821 – 6 August 1881)	18 May 1869	October 1871	2 years, 136 days
5		George Ide Butler (1834 – 1918)	October 1871	August 1874	2 years, 304 days
6		James Springer White (4 August 1821 – 6 August 1881)	August 1874	October 1880	6 years, 61 days
7		George Ide Butler (1834 – 1918)	October 1880	October 1888	8 years, 0 days
8		Ole Andres Olsen (28 July 1845 – 29 January 1915)	October 1888	March 1897	8 years, 151 days
9		George A. Irwin (17 November 1844 – 23 May 1913)	March 1897	1901	3 years, 306 days
10		Arthur Grosvenor Daniells (28 September 1858 – 18 April 1935)	1901	1922	21 years, 0 days
11		William Ambrose Spicer (1865 – 1952)	1922	1930	8 years, 0 days
12		Charles H. Watson (8 October 1877 – 24 December 1962)	1930	1936	6 years, 0 days
13		James Lamar McElhany (3 January 1880 – 25 June 1959)	1936	1950	14 years, 0 days
14		William Henry Branson (1887 – 1961)	1950	1954	4 years, 0 days
15		Reuben Richard Figuhr (20 October 1896 – 28 October 1983)	1954	16 June 1966	12 years, 166 days
16		Robert H. Pierson (1911 – 1989)	16 June 1966	3 January 1979	12 years, 201 days
17		Neal C. Wilson (5 July 1920 – 14 December 2010)	3 January 1979	6 July 1990	11 years, 184 days
18		Robert S. Folkenberg (1 January 1941 – 24 December 2015)	6 July 1990	8 February 1999	8 years, 217 days
19		Jan Paulsen (5 January 1935 – )	1 March 1999	23 June 2010	11 years, 114 days
20		Ted N. C. Wilson (10 May 1950 – )	23 June 2010	4 July 2025	15 years, 11 days
21		Erton Köhler (1969– )	4 July 2025	Present	283 days

== See also ==
- General Conference of Seventh-day Adventists
- Seventh-day Adventist Church
