= Erton Köhler =

President of the Seventh-day Adventist Church

Erton Carlos Köhler
- 21st President of the General Conference of the Seventh-day Adventists
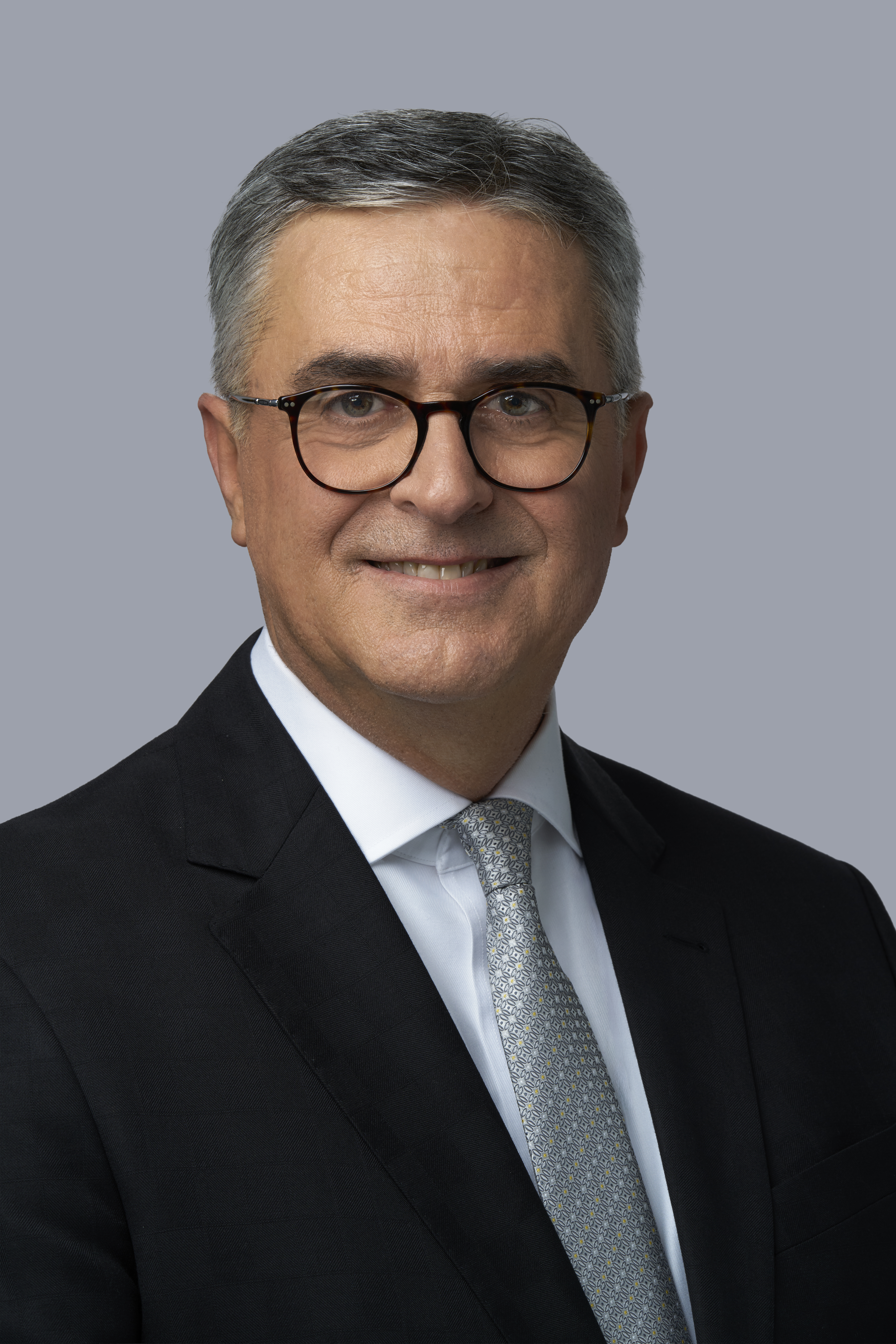
- Köhler in 2025
- Church: Seventh-day Adventist Church
- Diocese: General Conference
- Installed: 4 July 2025
- Predecessor: Ted N. C. Wilson

Orders
- Ordination: 19 June 1982

Personal details
- Born: Erton Carlos Köhler; 26 June 1969 (age 57) Caxias do Sul, Brazil
- Denomination: Seventh-day Adventist
- Residence: Silver Spring, Maryland, U.S.
- Spouse: Adriene Marques Köhler
- Children: 2
- Education: Adventist University Center of São Paulo, Andrews University
- Motto: Faithful to the Mission

Erton Carlos Köhler (born 26 June 1969) is a Brazilian Seventh-day Adventist pastor, theologian, and administrator serving as the President of the General Conference of Seventh-day Adventists, the denomination’s highest office, since 4 July 2025. He previously served as the General Conference’s Executive Secretary (2021–2025) and as President of the South American Division (2007–2021). Köhler is the first South American to lead the global Adventist Church.

== Early life and education ==
Köhler was born in Caxias do Sul, Brazil in 1969 into a family with a strong Adventist heritage. His father served as a church worker, which exposed him to ministry from an early age. He earned a Bachelor’s degree in Theology from Adventist University Center of São Paulo in 1989 and a Master’s degree in Pastoral Theology in 2008. Köhler later enrolled in the Doctor of Ministry program at Andrews University in the United States.

== Church ministry and leadership ==
From 1990 to 1994, Köhler served as a district pastor in São Paulo, Brazil. In 1995, he served as the Youth Ministries Director for the Rio Grande do Sul Conference and later as the Youth Ministries Director for the Northeast Brazilian Union in 1998. In 2002, he became Executive secretary of the Rio Grande dol Sul Conference. From 2003 to 2007, he was Youth Ministries Director for the South American Division.

In 2007, at the age of 38, Köhler was elected President of the South American Division, making him one of the youngest leaders to hold the position. During his tenure, he oversaw significant growth in membership and launched major evangelistic initiatives across eight countries.

In April 2021, Köhler became the Executive Secretary of the General Conference of Seventh-day Adventists, coordinating global mission strategies and overseeing membership statistics.

== General Conference presidency ==
On 4 July 2025, Köhler was elected the 21st President of the General Conference during the 62nd GC Session in St. Louis, Missouri. He succeeded Ted N. C. Wilson after global delegates voted 1,721 to 188, a 90.15% approval rating.

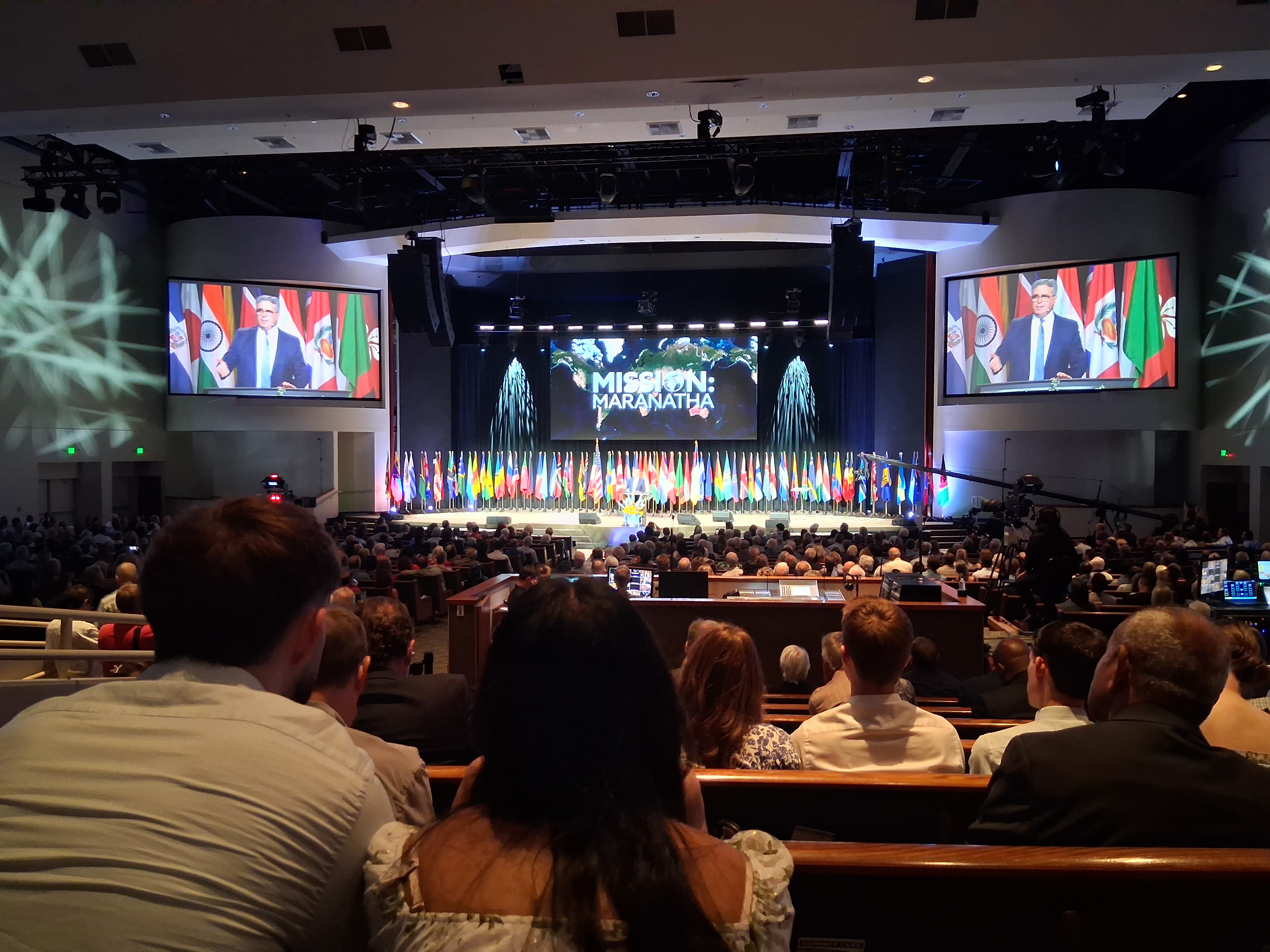
Pastor Erton C. Köhler, president of the Adventist World Church, speaking at the Mission 2025: Maranatha Convention in Sacramento, CA.

== Personal life ==
Köhler is married to Adriene Marques Köhler, a professional nurse. The couple have a daughter Mariana and a son Matheus. He is of German descent and speaks fluent Portuguese, Spanish, and English.

Preceded by Ted Wilson	President of the General Conference of Seventh-day Adventists; 2025–	Succeeded by Incumbent
