= Jan Paulsen =

Seventh-day Adventist Church leader

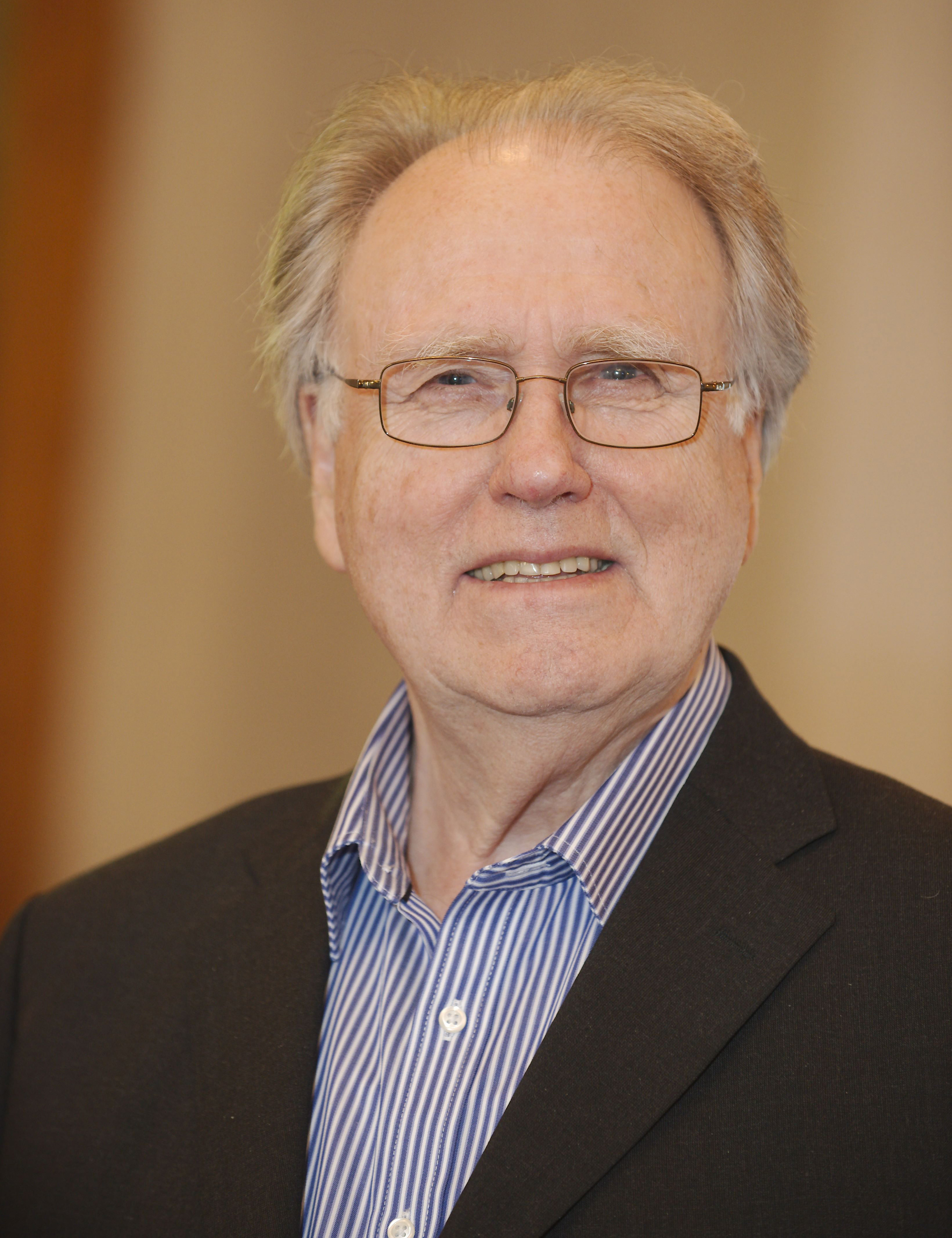

19th President of the General Conference of Seventh day Adventists
- In office 1 March 1999 – 23 June 2010
- Preceded by: Robert S. Folkenberg
- Succeeded by: Ted N. C. Wilson

Vice president of the General Conference of Seventh day Adventists
- In office 1995–1999

President of the Trans-European Division of Seventh-day Adventists
- In office 1983–1995

Personal details
- Born: 5 January 1935 (age 91) Narvik, Norway
- Spouse: Kari Trykkerud
- Children: 3
- Education: Andrews University, Adventist Theological Seminary, Potomac University, University of Tübingen
- Profession: Theologian, Educator, and Administrator

Dr. Jan Paulsen is a Seventh-day Adventist Church leader. Paulsen has served in Africa, Europe and America. He was president of the General Conference of Seventh-day Adventists from March 1999 to June 2010.

== Presidential service ==
Paulsen was first elected upon his predecessor's resignation for the remainder of the term ending in 2000. He was re-elected to the office of president at the 57th General Conference Session in Toronto, Ontario, Canada in 2000. During this term, Paulsen's office was responsible for the initiation of such programs as "Go One Million", "Faith & Science Dialogues" and "Sow One Billion". Paulsen also took the initiative to open dialogue between the youth of the church through his "Let's Talk" campaign. On 1 July 2005, Paulsen was again re-elected to the office during the 58th General Conference Session in St. Louis, Missouri. His term ended on 25 June 2010, when Ted N. C. Wilson was elected as president during the 59th General Conference Session in Atlanta, Georgia.

In December 2003, following the DePaiva family murders in Palau, Jansen expressed his condolences to the surviving daughter and urged Adventists worldwide to keep the church of Palau in prayers. The DePaivas were Brazilian American missionaries from Michigan.

== Previous roles ==
Paulsen was vice-president of the General Conference from 1995 until his appointment as president. Prior to that, he was president of the Trans-European Division from 1983 to 1995. He has also been a pastor, a departmental leader, a teacher and a college president, and has written three books.

== Biographical notes ==
Paulsen was born on 5 January 1935, in Narvik, Norway to Adventist parents. Baptized at the age of 14, he attended Vejlefjord High School in Denmark and graduated in 1954. On 1 July 1955, he married Kari Trykkerud, with whom he has had three children: Laila (1961), Jan-Rune (1963) and Rein Andre (1970).

Paulsen studied theology in Denmark before obtaining a Bachelor of Theology degree from Andrews University. He went on to obtain his master's degree from Potomac University. Paulsen also has a Bachelor of Divinity degree from the Adventist Theological Seminary at Andrews University. He is the first Adventist Church world president to hold a doctorate, which he obtained from the University of Tübingen.

Paulsen is the third non-American president of the World Church.

In February 2008, Paulsen was the first Adventist Church president to be interviewed on a major international television network, by Mike Schneider on Night Talk, Bloomberg Television.

He has outlined "three people in particular... who have helped me along the way" – his mother, schoolteacher O. K. Naerland and "mentor" theologian Ted Heppenstall.

On 11 November 2011, Paulsen was named a Commander of the Royal Norwegian Order of Merit. The award was presented at Tyrifjord Videregående Skole on 2 June 2012.

== Publications ==
- When the Spirit Descends (Review & Herald, 2001) - ISBN 0-8280-1448-5
- Let Your Life So Shine (Pacific Press, 2003) - ISBN 0-8163-1948-0
- Where Are We Going? (Pacific Press, 2011) - ISBN 0-8163-2509-X

== See also ==
- History of the Seventh-day Adventist Church

Preceded by Robert S. Folkenberg	President of the General Conference of Seventh-day Adventists; 1999 - 2010	Succeeded by Ted N. C. Wilson
