= Abajiri =

Ugandan Seventh-day Adventist group

Abajiri, roughly translating to "The People of the Gospel," and also known as 666, is a minor eschatological Christian sect in the Luweero and Nakasongola districts of Uganda, and has since spread over the country. It was launched in 1992, when its founders split it off from the Seventh-day Adventist Church. The sect's most distinguishing practices are prohibiting the usage of mobile phones, attending local hospitals, state schooling for children, immunization, and census-taking. Members of the sect believe that when children go to a government school, or when people are subject to a census, they come into contact with Satan's number (666). Because of this, they prevent their children from attending. These beliefs are based on 1 Chronicles 21:1–16, in which David orders a census of Israel. God became angry, considering David's order a grave sin, and punished Israel. Since many of the children in this sect are not vaccinated and do not go to school, the local government in regions where Abajiri is prominent fears a possible outbreak of disease and illiteracy.

666 boasts of over 20,000 followers in Uganda. Other estimates estimate the group at "over a hundred members" in Luweero district. Ugandan Police estimate that the group has "over 10,000 members" in Uganda. Because of their refusal to participate in censuses, the exact number of members is not known. The government of Uganda estimates that 3% of Ugandan children are not vaccinated. It is possible that this number is influenced by the existence of the Abajiri sect.

== Beliefs and practices ==
Originally, the sect did not refuse to bring children to school. The group became suspicious with the government and state schooling after Uganda introduced Universal Primary Education Pupil Identification Numbers (PIN) in the 1990s. Abajiri's members claim that these 15-digit PIN numbers, which contain the student's private information, are sent to a three-storey high computer in Belgium called "The Beast." This computer lists all the people that are tracked by the Number of the Beast, allowing the children to be monitored and observed. The Ugandan government, however, claims that these numbers exist purely for monitoring student attendance as they pass through the education system. However, members of the group do allow education, just not from the government. Abajiri followers have set up schools in their own communities which are entirely separate from state schooling.

The website truthorfiction.com claims that the Belgian computer was fabricated as a fictional story by Joe Musser, a Christian Life magazine author. When Musser realized that his magazine was passing his writing as fact, he wrote a letter to them stating that he was only creating a scenario for the novel Behold a Pale Horse and a screenplay for The Rapture.

For the same reasons, The People of the Gospel eschew participating in censuses or any government record-taking whatsoever, including ATMs, license plates, and driving permits. Members don't vote or apply for bank accounts. During the 2014 National Population and Housing Census undertaken by Uganda, followers of the Abajiri sect refused to participate in the census, due to their belief that the census was taken out to enforce the satanic New World Order. Some, estimated at over 300, fled from their homes, and six were arrested and forcibly counted in prison.

The sect emphasizes that the world is in the 'end-times' and that the Apocalypse, as outlined in the Christian faith, is near.

666's local congregations are known as Enjiri.

The group's members view vaccination as inessential because the government keeps a record of all vaccinations. Local witch doctors in Luweero District have been reported to refuse vaccination teams from entering their villages, assuring them that the witch doctors could heal all ailments "traditionally" and no vaccinations were required.

== Government reaction ==
On 10 March 2016, in an attempt to increase vaccination rates, President Yoweri Museveni signed an act into law that would jail parents that refused to vaccinate their children for up to six months. It also requires children to have an immunization card to be able to attend state schooling.

Sembabule District in Uganda banned 666 from carrying out prayers in 2014 due to their members' refusal to participate in the census.

Luweero District has also allegedly banned the sect from practice under threat of arrest.

== See also ==
- Holy Spirit Movement
- Issa Masiya
- Movement for the Restoration of the Ten Commandments of God
- Kimbanguism
