= Valuegenesis =

"Valuegenesis" is a research study into the faith and values of young people attending Seventh-day Adventist high schools in North America in the three areas of family, school and church. The first survey was conducted in 1990, a second major survey was conducted in 2000, and a third took place in 2010. Related studies also termed "Valuegenesis" have been conducted in other countries.

== History ==
Valuegenesis began as one component of "Project Affirmation", a research study by the North American Division (United States and Canada) Office of Education into Adventist education.

The first study, "Valuegenesis^{1}" (or simply Valuegenesis) began in 1989. In 1990, more than 13,000 students responded to a survey. Following the study, the Project Affirmation Taskforces gave recommendations for change, which they called "Imperatives for Action". It called for youth ministry resource centers to be established. The John H. Hancock Center for Youth Ministry was formed.

In 1993, Steve W. Case criticised the lack of focus on youth of the church, despite the results of the studies.

The children's Sabbath School curriculum was overhauled, with the lessons Our Little Friend through Insight completely rewritten in 2000.

Ten years after the first survey, in 2000, the follow-up study "Valuegenesis^{2}" was conducted. More than 18,000 students responded from over 22,000 questionnaires sent out. According to reports by the researchers, students in the second study exhibited a greater faith maturity, yet spent less time reading the Bible.

Further studies were conducted in Europe and other parts of the world. For instance, a "Valuegenesis" survey was conducted in the South Pacific Division in 1997. The principal researcher was Barry Gane.

=== Spinoffs ===
Valuegenesis has also inspired other studies. A study known as "AVANCE" (Spanish for "advance") was conducted of Latino Adventists in the North American Division in 1993 and 1994. Edwin Hernández was the principal investigator of this study, which was a follow-up to Valuegenesis.

Steve W. Case edited the book Shall We Dance? Rediscovering Christ-Centered Standards, published in 1996. It is based on the Valuegenesis study, and has had a significant impact on the church. One review was by Richard Duerksen. Samuele Bacchiocchi's review was critical. See also an article of the same title by Case. Other articles, again of the same title may be related – by Karl Tstalbasidis and Deena Bartel-Wagner.

Case is known for emphasizing the support of youth in the church. He is also more on the progressive (liberal) end of the church culturally; for instance, he re-evaluates traditional beliefs about dancing and jewelry.

== Publications ==
- Barry Gane, Youth Ministry and the Transmission of Beliefs and Values, 1997. Valuegenesis Project Report no. 3

Project Affirmation

- V. Bailey Gillespie, ed. Perspectives on Values, 1993

== See also ==
- Seventh-day Adventist education
