= James Lamar McElhany =

Church administrator (1880–1959)

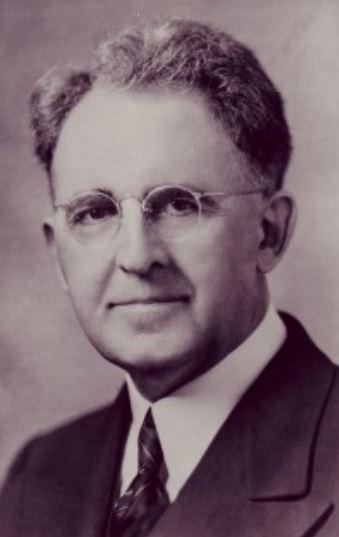

13th President of the General Conference of Seventh day Adventists
- In office 1936–1950
- Preceded by: Charles H. Watson
- Succeeded by: William Henry Branson

Personal details
- Born: January 3, 1880 California
- Died: June 25, 1959 (aged 79)
- Profession: Pastor

James Lamar McElhany (January 3, 1880 – June 25, 1959) was an American Seventh-day Adventist minister and administrator who served as the President of the General Conference from 1936 to 1950. He was a pioneer seventh-day minister in the Far East Division missionary work.

McElhany was born near Santa Maria, California on January 3, 1880, to James Lamar Sr. and Mary (Ford) McElhany. James' parents had joined the Seventh-Day Adventist church before his birth, and he was baptized into church membership at the age of 15. in 1900 he began studies at Healdsburg College, where he decided to become a minister.

He entered ministry as a colporteur for the Adventist church in 1902. In 1903, he moved to Australia and worked as a traveling evangelist, until 1906 when he moved to the Philippines and pursued evangelism there. In 1908 they again moved to a new country, this time New Zealand. He then returned home to the United States, where he was posted to various administrative offices, including presidencies of the Greater New York Conference, the California Conference, the Southern Union Conference, and the Pacific Union Conference.

He was elected President of the General Conference of Seventh-Day Adventists in 1936. He was elected twice more, serving in this capacity until 1950. He was known for even-handedness and compassion. Reflecting on his tenure, he stated that he did not enjoy this duty, as it "wore me out."

In later years he suffered blindness from cataracts, but had surgery that restored his sight after some time. He suffered a stroke, and died on June 25, 1959.

== See also ==
- General Conference of Seventh-day Adventists
- Seventh-day Adventist Church
- Seventh-day Adventist theology
- Seventh-day Adventist eschatology
- History of the Seventh-day Adventist Church

Preceded by Charles H. Watson	President of the General Conference of Seventh-day Adventists; 1936 - 1950	Succeeded by William Henry Branson
