= Ted N. C. Wilson =

Former President of the Seventh-day Adventist Church

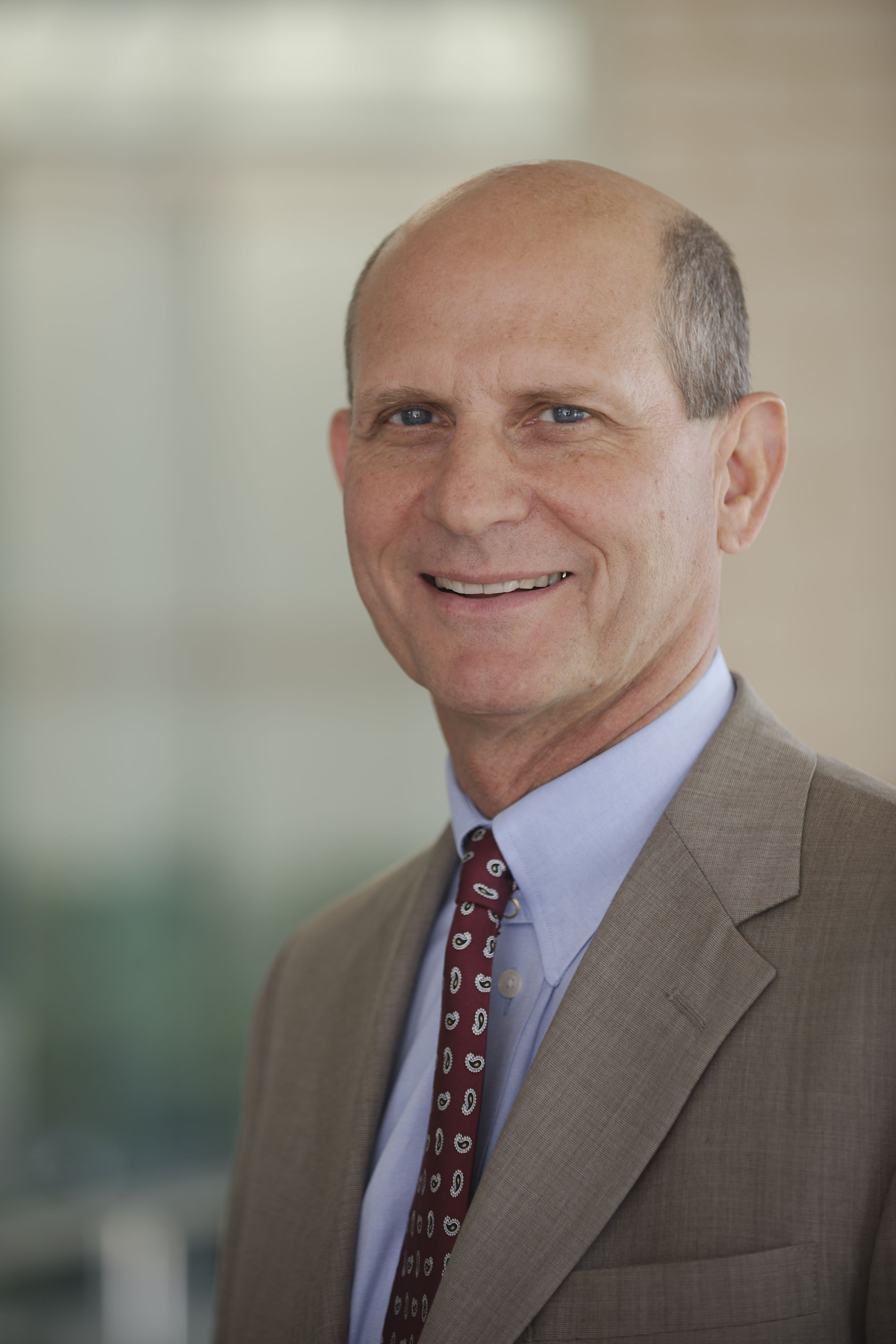
- Wilson in 2012

20th President of the General Conference of Seventh-day Adventists
- In office June 23, 2010 – July 4, 2025
- Preceded by: Jan Paulsen
- Succeeded by: Erton Köhler

Vice President of the General Conference of Seventh-day Adventists
- In office August 2000 – June 23, 2010

President of the Euro-Asia Division of Seventh-day Adventists
- In office 1992–1996

Personal details
- Born: May 10, 1950 (age 76) Takoma Park, Maryland
- Spouse: Nancy Wilson
- Parent(s): Neal C. Wilson and Elinor E. Wilson
- Education: Washington Adventist University (BA); Loma Linda University School of Public Health (MSPH); Andrews University (MDiv); New York University (PhD)
- Profession: Pastor

Theodore Norman Clair "Ted" Wilson (born May 10, 1950) is an ordained Seventh-day Adventist (SDA) minister. He is known for being the President of the General Conference (GC), the worldwide governing organization of the SDA Church, from 2010 to 2025. On July 4, 2025, he was succeeded by Erton Köhler.

== Family and Education ==
Ted Wilson was born in Takoma Park, Maryland, on May 10, 1950, to Neal C. Wilson (GC president: 1979–1990) and Elinor E. Wilson. He and his wife, Nancy Louise (Vollmer) Wilson (a physiotherapist), have three daughters (Emile, Elizabeth, and Catherine) and eleven grandchildren.

Wilson received a Bachelor of Arts degree in religion and business administration from Columbia Union College (now Washington Adventist University); a Master of Science degree in public health from Loma Linda University; a Master of Divinity degree from Andrews University, and a Doctor of Philosophy degree in religious education from New York University.

== Career ==
Wilson's SDA career began in 1974 as a pastor in the Greater New York Conference, and assistant director and director of Metropolitan Ministries from 1976 until 1981. He was a departmental director and later executive secretary of the Africa-Indian Ocean Division of the GC until 1990. After a two-year term as an associate secretary of the GC, Wilson became president of the Euro-Asia Division of the GC from 1992 to 1996. He was president of the Review and Herald Publishing Association until 2000, when he became a GC vice president. At the 59th GC Session in 2010, Wilson was elected President to replace Jan Paulsen, a position he held until 2025.

During his GC presidency, Wilson was engaged in various SDA controversies over biblical, theological, political, and life-style issues, including the writings of Ellen White, creation-evolution, spiritual formation, last generation theology, the ordination of women in pastoral ministry, and human sexuality.

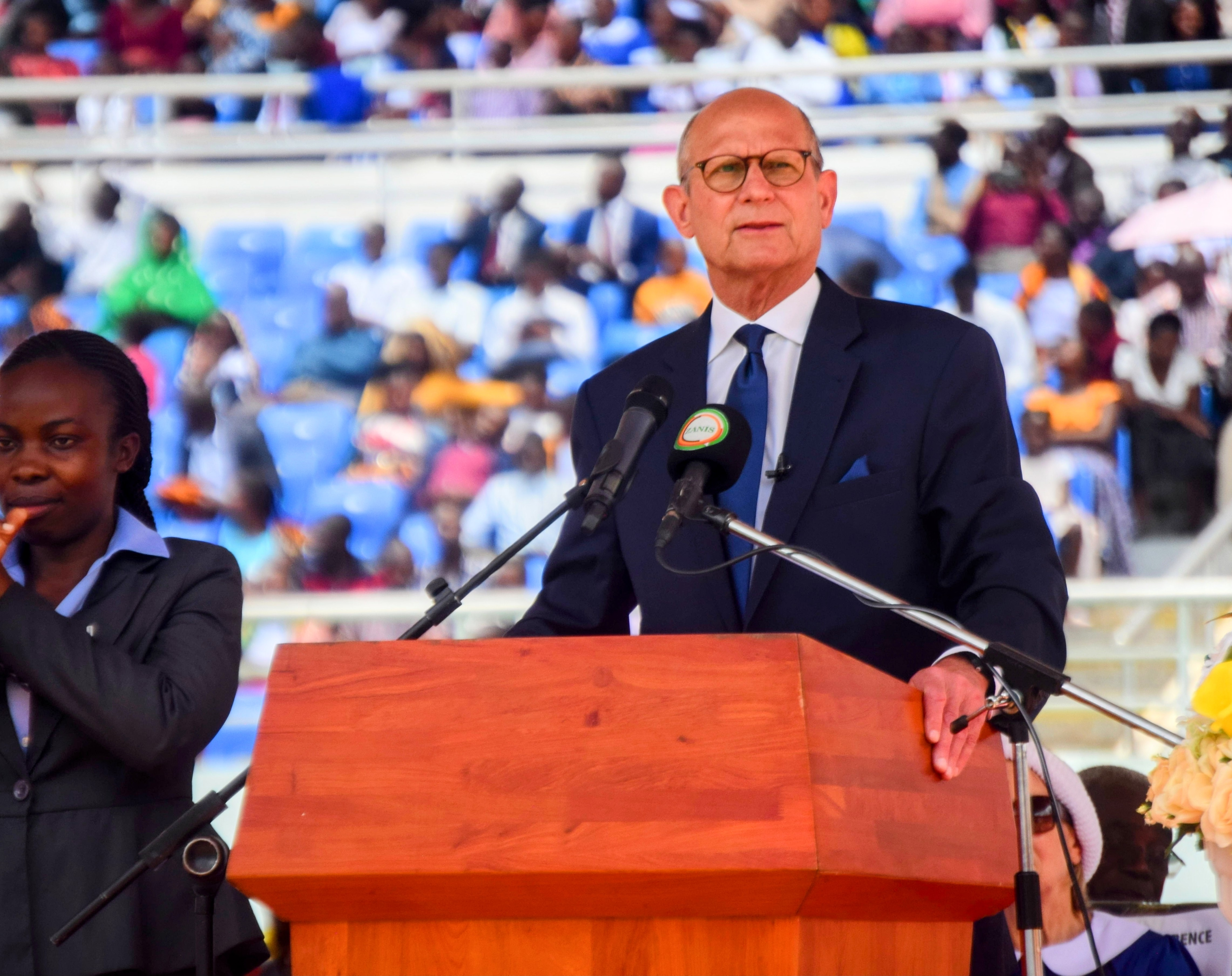
Ted Wilson during the Big Sabbath in Lusaka, Zambia.

Wilson's 36 years of SDA service included pastoral, administrative, and executive roles in Mid-Atlantic United States, Africa, Russia, and the world church.

== See also ==
- Seventh-day Adventist Church
- List of presidents of the General Conference of Seventh-day Adventists

Preceded by Jan Paulsen	President of the General Conference of Seventh-day Adventists; 2010-2025	Succeeded by Erton Köhler
