= Seventh-day Adventist Church =

Protestant Christian denomination

- The Seventh-day Adventist logo
- Classification: Protestant
- Orientation: Adventist
- Theology: Seventh-day Adventist theology
- Polity: Presbyterian/Episcopal
- President: Erton Köhler
- Region: Worldwide
- Founder: Joseph Bates; James White; Ellen G. White; J. N. Andrews
- Origin: May 21, 1863; 163 years ago Battle Creek, Michigan, U.S.
- Branched from: Millerites
- Separations: SDA Reform Movement and True and Free SDAs (separated 1925, small minorities); Davidian SDAs (separated 1929, small minority); United Sabbath-Day Adventist Church (separated 1929, small minority); Adventist Church of Promise (separated 1932, small minority); Abajiri (separated 1992, large minority)
- Congregations: 100,869 (2024)
- Members: 24,051,322 (2025)
- Pastors: 20,924
- Aid organization: Adventist Development and Relief Agency
- Hospitals: 229
- Nursing homes: 129
- Primary schools: 6,623
- Secondary schools: 2,640
- Tertiary institutions: 118
- Other names: Adventist church, SDA (informal)
- Official website: adventist.org

The Seventh-day Adventist Church (SDA) is an Adventist Christian denomination which is distinguished by its observance of Saturday, the seventh day of the week in the Christian (Gregorian) and the Hebrew calendar, as the Sabbath; its emphasis on the imminent Second Coming (advent) of Jesus Christ; and its annihilationist soteriology. The denomination grew out of the Millerite movement in the United States during the mid-19th century, and it was formally established in 1863. Among its co-founders was Ellen G. White, whose extensive writings are still held in high regard by the church. Seventh-day Adventists have compared Ellen G. White to biblical prophets.

Some of the theology of the Seventh-day Adventist Church corresponds to common evangelical Christian teachings, such as the Trinity and the infallibility of Scripture. Distinctive eschatological teachings include soul sleep, the doctrine of an investigative judgment and annihilationism. The church emphasizes following the Jewish dietary law, advocates vegetarianism, and its holistic view of human nature—i.e., that the body, soul, and spirit form one inseparable entity. The church holds the belief that "God created the universe, and in a recent six-day creation made the heavens and the earth, the sea, and all that is in them, and rested on the seventh day." Marriage is defined as a lifelong union between a man and a woman. The second coming of Christ and resurrection of the dead are among official beliefs.

The world church is governed by a General Conference of Seventh-day Adventists, with smaller regions administered by divisions, unions, local conferences, and local missions. The Seventh-day Adventist Church is as of 2016 "one of the fastest-growing and most widespread churches worldwide", with a worldwide baptized membership of over 24 million people. As of May 2007, it was the twelfth-largest Protestant religious body in the world and the sixth-largest highly international religious body. It is ethnically and culturally diverse and maintains a missionary presence in over 215 countries and territories. The church operates over 7,500 schools, including over 100 post-secondary institutions, as well as numerous hospitals and publishing houses worldwide, a humanitarian aid organization known as the Adventist Development and Relief Agency (ADRA), and tax-exempt businesses such as Sanitarium, the proceeds of which contribute to the church's charitable and religious activities.

== History ==
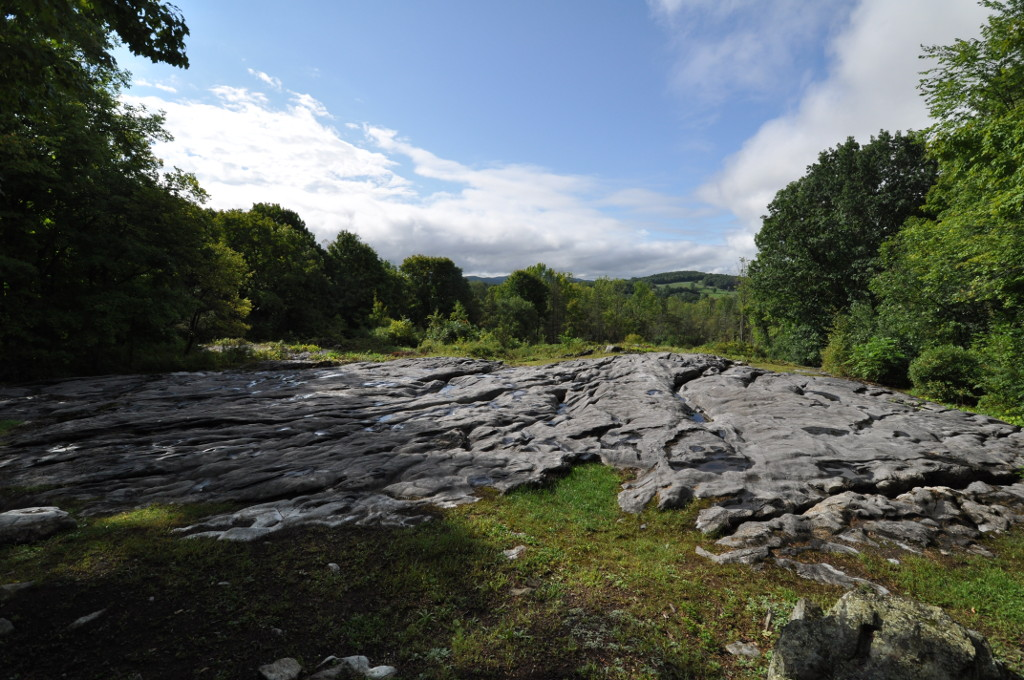
Ascension Rock where some Millerites waited for the Second Coming of Jesus

The Seventh-day Adventist Church is the largest of several Adventist groups which arose from the Millerite movement of the 1840s in upstate New York, a phase of the Second Great Awakening. William Miller predicted on the basis of Daniel 8:14–16 and the "day-year principle" that Jesus Christ would return to Earth between the spring of 1843 and the spring of 1844. In the summer of 1844, Millerites came to believe that Jesus would return on October 22, 1844, understood to be the biblical Day of Atonement for that year. Miller's failed prediction became known as the "Great Disappointment".

Hiram Edson and other Millerites came to believe that Miller's calculations were correct, but that his interpretation of Daniel 8:14 was flawed as he assumed Christ would come to cleanse the world. These Adventists came to the conviction that Daniel 8:14 foretold Christ's entrance into the most holy place of the heavenly sanctuary rather than his Second Coming. Over the next few decades this understanding of a sanctuary in heaven developed into the doctrine of the investigative judgment, an eschatological process that commenced in 1844, in which every person would be judged to verify their eligibility for salvation and God's justice will be confirmed before the universe. This group of Adventists continued to believe that Christ's second coming continues to be imminent; however, they resisted setting further dates for the event, citing Revelation 10:6, "that there should be time no longer."

=== Development of Sabbatarianism ===
As the early Adventist movement consolidated its beliefs, the question of the biblical day of rest and worship was raised. The foremost proponent of Sabbath-keeping among early Adventists was Joseph Bates. Bates was introduced to the Sabbath doctrine through a tract written by Millerite preacher Thomas M. Preble, who in turn had been influenced by Rachel Oakes Preston, a young Seventh Day Baptist. This message was gradually accepted and formed the topic of the first edition of the church publication The Present Truth, which appeared in July 1849.

=== Organization and recognition ===
For about 20 years, the Adventist movement consisted of a small, loosely knit group of people who came from many churches and whose primary means of connection and interaction was through James White's periodical The Advent Review and Sabbath Herald. They embraced the doctrines of the Sabbath, the heavenly sanctuary interpretation of Daniel 8:14, conditional immortality, and the expectation of Christ's premillennial return. Among its most prominent figures were Joseph Bates, James White, and Ellen G. White. Ellen White came to occupy a particularly central role; her many visions and spiritual leadership convinced her fellow Adventists that she possessed the gift of prophecy.

On May 21, 1863, the Seventh-day Adventist Church was officially founded in Battle Creek, Michigan. The denominational headquarters were later moved from Battle Creek to Takoma Park, Maryland, where they remained until 1989. The General Conference headquarters then moved to its current location in Silver Spring, Maryland.

In the 1870s, the denomination turned to evangelism through missionary work and revivals, tripling its membership to 16,000 by 1880 and establishing a presence beyond North America during the late 19th century. The denomination's rapid growth continued, with 75,000 members in 1901. By that time, the denomination operated two colleges, a medical school, a dozen academies, 27 hospitals, and 13 publishing houses. By 1945, the church estimated that it had 210,000 members in the US and Canada, along with 360,000 members who lived in other parts of the world; the church's budget was $29 million and the number of students who were enrolled in the church's schools was 140,000.

== Beliefs ==
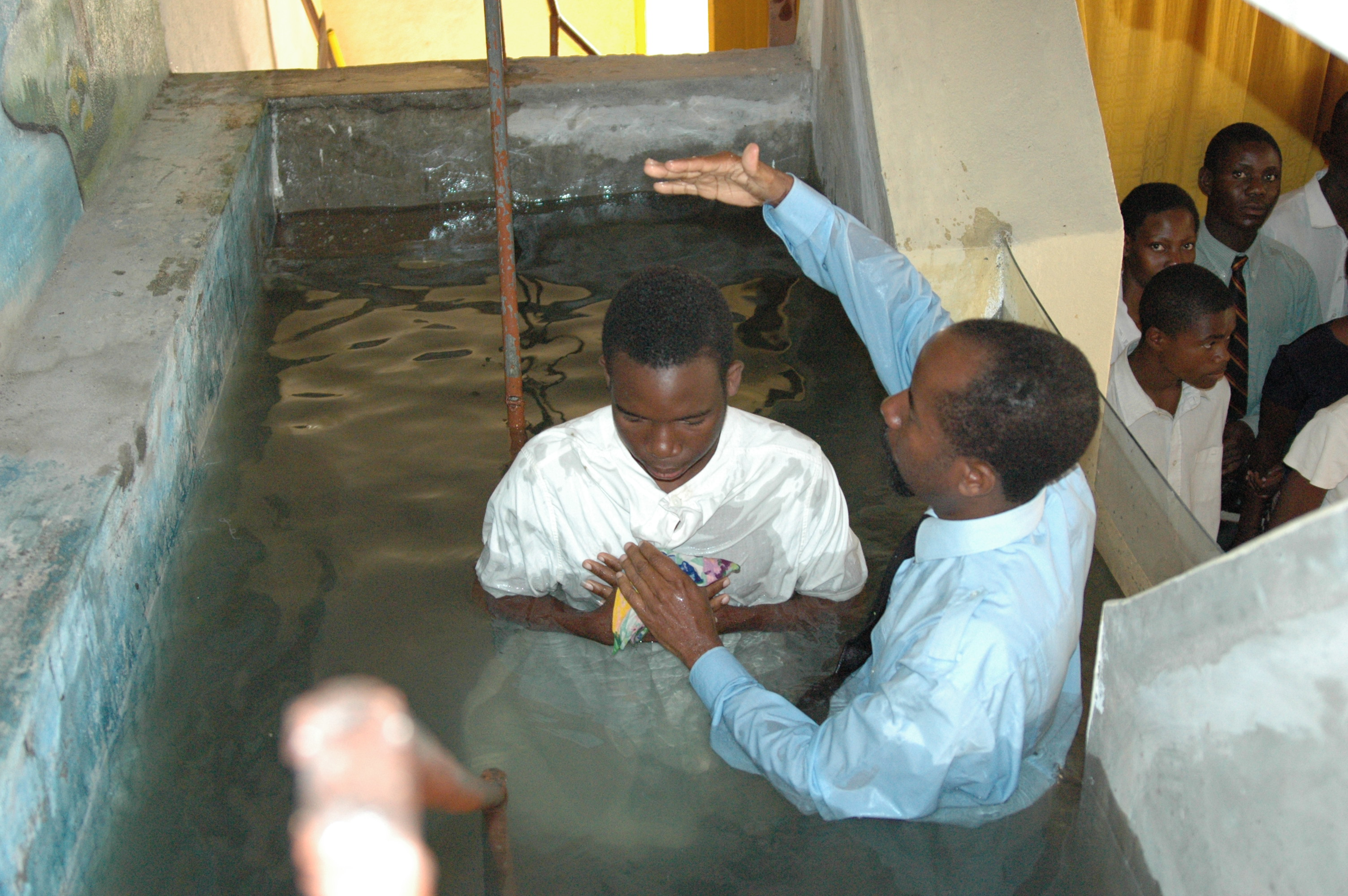
Baptism of young man in Mozambique

The church first published its beliefs and doctrines in Battle Creek, Michigan in 1872, as a brief statement which was titled "A Synopsis of Our Faith". The church experienced challenges as it formed its core beliefs and doctrines, especially as a number of the early Adventist leaders came from churches that held to some form of Arianism (Ellen G. White was not one of them). This, along with some of the movement's other theological views, led conservative evangelical Protestants to regard it as a cult. According to Adventist scholars, the teachings and writings of White ultimately proved influential in shifting the church from largely semi-Arian roots towards Trinitarianism. Adventists, for the most part, credit her with bringing the Seventh-day Adventist church into a more comprehensive awareness of the Godhead during the 1890s. The Adventist Church adopted Trinitarian theology early in the 20th century and began to dialogue with other Protestant groups toward the middle of the century, eventually gaining wide recognition as a Protestant church. Christianity Today recognized the Seventh-day Adventist church as "the fifth-largest Christian communion worldwide" in its January 22, 2015 issue.

Although her husband claimed that her visions did not support the Trinitarian creed, her writings reveal a growing awareness on the "mystery of the Godhead". After continued Bible study, and after a decades-long debate, the denomination eventually concluded that Scripture explicitly teaches the belief in the existence of a triune God, and it affirmed that biblical view in the non-credal 28 Fundamental Beliefs.

However, mainstream scholars are still not convinced that Ellen White was a Nicene Trinitarian. In her writing, she mentions a ceremony in heaven where Jesus was recognized in front of the heavenly host, to be equal with the Father, of which Satan disapproved (as explained in her book Spirit of Prophecy Vol. 1).

The official teachings of the Seventh-day Adventist denomination are expressed in its 28 Fundamental Beliefs. This statement of beliefs was originally adopted by the General Conference in 1980, with an additional belief (number 11) being added in 2005. Almost all of the 28 Fundamental Beliefs are the same as other evangelical Protestant denominations. The Adventist beliefs that evangelicals consider heterodoxy is worshiping God on Saturday, the gift of prophecy by Ellen G. White and the sanctuary doctrine.

The church believes God created Earth in six days and rested on the seventh day, Saturday. The Seventh-day Adventist Church believes in baptizing new members by immersion. It believes the Bible to be the most important book. They believe when humans die, that they remain asleep until they are brought back to life. Eternal life is given to people who accept Jesus as their Savior. The church believes that salvation can only be obtained through Jesus. It believes that the investigative judgment will take place in heaven before Jesus returns to earth. The church believes in the Apocalypse of John which will bring on the Second Coming of Jesus.

=== Sabbath activities ===
Part of Friday might be spent in preparation for the Sabbath; for example, preparing meals and tidying homes. Adventists may gather for Friday evening worship to welcome in the Sabbath, a practice often known as vespers.

==== Worship service ====
The major weekly worship service occurs on Saturday, typically commencing with Sabbath School which is a structured time of small-group bible study at church. Adventists make use of an officially produced "Sabbath School Lesson", which deals with a particular biblical text or doctrine every quarter. Members read the "Sabbath School Lesson" or watched it online.

After a brief break, the community joins together again for a church service that follows a typical evangelical format, with a sermon as a central feature. Corporate singing, Scripture readings, prayers and an offering, including tithing (money collection), are other standard features. The instruments and forms of worship music vary greatly throughout the worldwide church.

==== Holy Communion ====
Adventist churches usually practice open communion four times a year. It commences with a foot washing ceremony, known as the "Ordinance of Humility", based on the Gospel account of John 13. The Ordinance of Humility is meant to emulate Christ's washing of his disciples' feet at the Last Supper and to remind participants of the need to humbly serve one another. Participants segregate by gender to separate rooms to conduct this ritual, although some congregations allow married couples to perform the ordinance on each other and families are often encouraged to participate together. After its completion, participants return to the main sanctuary for consumption of the Lord's Supper, which consists of unleavened bread and unfermented grape juice.

=== Health and diet ===
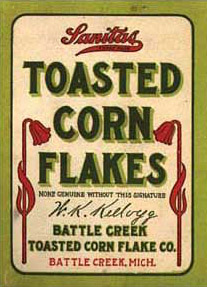
Corn flakes package from 1906

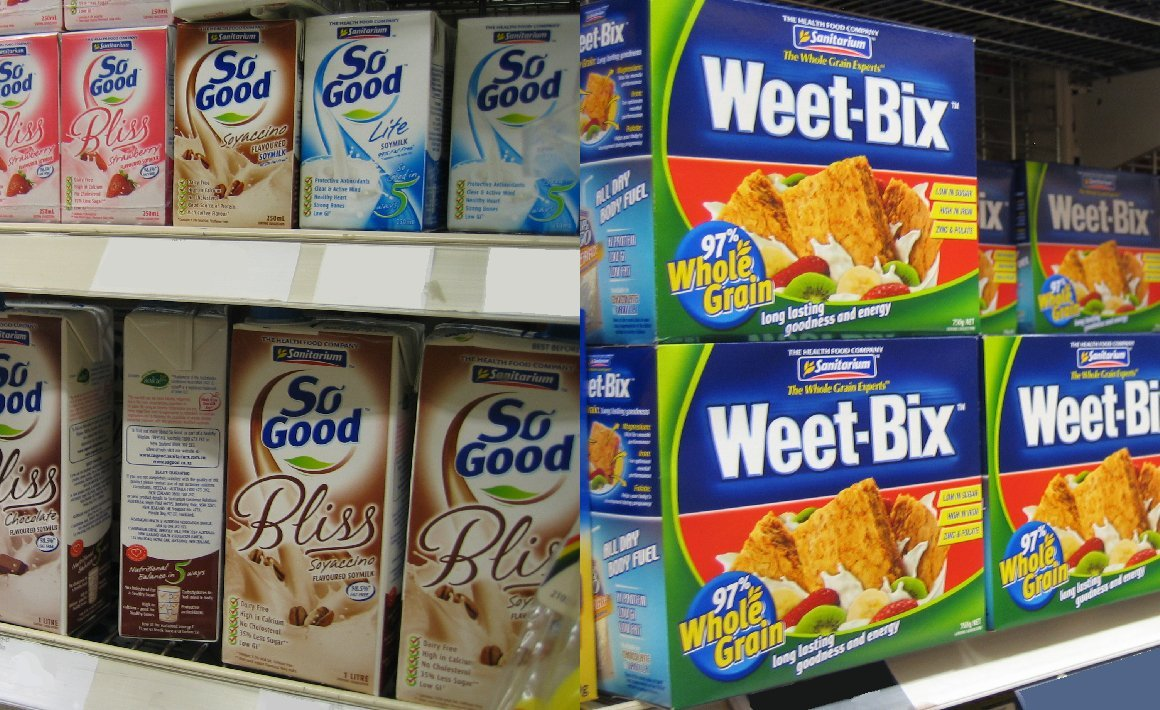
Sanitarium products for sale

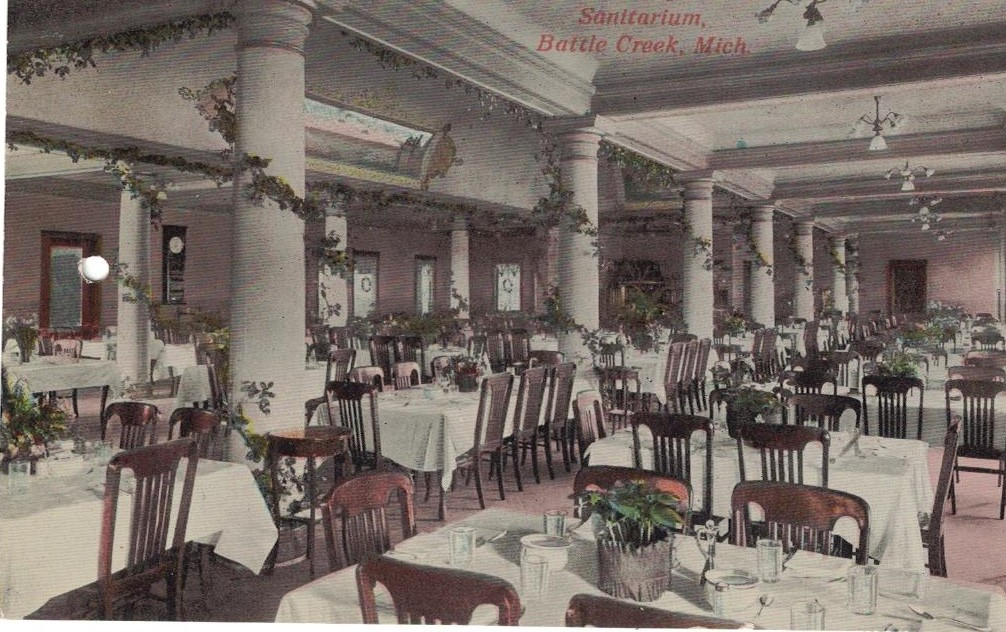
The main dining room of the Battle Creek Sanitarium founded in Michigan by Adventists and run by John Harvey Kellogg. The sanitarium only served vegetarian meals.

Since the Seventh-day Adventist Church began in the 1860s, it has advocated its members to eat a vegetarian diet, particularly the consumption of kosher foods described in Leviticus 11, meaning abstinence from pork, rabbit, shellfish, and other animals proscribed as "unclean". The church discourages its members from consuming alcoholic beverages, tobacco, and illegal drugs. In addition, some Adventists avoid processed foods and caffeine.

The pioneers of the Adventist Church had much to do with the common acceptance of breakfast cereals and meat alternatives into the Western diet. John Harvey Kellogg started the meat alternative movement by creating Protose, a seasoned patty made of wheat gluten and peanuts, at Battle Creek Sanitarium, which was later sold through mail order by Battle Creek Food Company. The Battle Creek Food Company manufactured mostly meat alternatives for the guests at Battle Creek Sanitarium. Will Keith Kellogg and John Harvey Kellogg invented corn flakes at Battle Creek Sanitarium, by putting stale wheat berry between rollers and baking it. It was later served to the sanitarium guests. The Kellogg brothers also invented bran flakes and Rice Krispies. Later in 1906, Will Keith Kellogg founded the Battle Creek Toasted Corn Flake Company in Battle Creek, Michigan. Special Foods founded in Worthington, Ohio, in 1939, manufactured nut meat substitutes. After World War II, it changed its name to Worthington Foods. Worthington Foods introduced two canned meat alternatives in 1949: Soyloin Steaks, and Meatless Wieners. In 1960, it bought the rights to manufacture and market Battle Creek Foods Company products after John Harvey Kellogg died. In 1975, it released its frozen, soy-based meatless foods nationwide. In both Australia and New Zealand, Sanitarium Health and Wellbeing Company owned by the church manufactures brands such as So Good, Up & Go, and Weet-Bix.

The Adventist Health Studies indicate that the average Adventist in California lives four to ten years longer than the average Californian. The research concludes that Adventists live longer because they do not smoke or drink alcohol; have a day of rest every week; and maintain a healthy, low-fat, vegetarian diet that is rich in nuts and beans. The cohesiveness of Adventists' social networks also has been put forward as an explanation for their extended lifespan. Dan Buettner named Loma Linda, California a "Blue Zone" of longevity, and attributes that to the large concentration of Seventh-day Adventists and their health practices. The 96,000 adults who participated in the Adventist Health Studies-2 from 2001 to 2007 were 30 to 112 years old, and lived in Canada and the United States. The study revealed that 8% were vegans, 28% were ovo/lacto-vegetarians, 10% were pesco-vegetarians, 6% semi-vegetarian, and 48% non-vegetarian. 98.9% of the participants were non-smokers and 93.4% abstained from drinking alcohol. Those who were vegetarian had a much lower risk of obesity, hypertension, and hyperglycemia. Adventists who were vegetarian had a lower risk of breast cancer, colorectal cancer, coronary heart disease, lung cancer, and prostate cancer, compared to non-vegetarians. Those who were vegan had a lower body mass index, compared to vegetarians and meat eaters.

Adventists' clean lifestyles were recognized by the U.S. military in 1954 when 2,200 Adventists volunteered to serve as human test subjects in Operation Whitecoat: a biodefense medical research program whose stated purpose was to defend troops and civilians against biological weapons.

=== Marriage ===
The Adventist definition of marriage is a lawfully binding lifelong commitment between a man and a woman. The Church Manual professes the belief that marriage originated as an institution from the biblical story of Adam and Eve and that their union should be used as the pattern for all other marriages.

Adventists hold that marriage is a divine institution established by God during the events of the Book of Genesis prior to the expulsion of Adam and Eve from Eden. They believe that God celebrated the union of Adam and Eve and that the concept of marriage was one of the first gifts of God to man, and that it is "one of the two institutions that, after the fall, Adam brought with him beyond the gates of Paradise."

The Old and New Testament texts are interpreted by some Adventists to teach that wives should submit to their husbands in marriage.

Adventists hold that heterosexual marriages are the only biblically ordained grounds for sexual intimacy.

=== Ethics and sexuality ===
The Seventh-day Adventist Church opposes abortion, believing it can have long-term negative effects on both the individuals involved and society as a whole. In an official statement on the "Biblical View of Unborn Life", the church declared that an unborn child is considered by God to be a living individual. However, there are circumstances where the mother's life is at risk and Seventh-day Adventist hospitals will perform emergency abortions.

Adventists encourage sexual abstinence for both men and women before marriage. The church disapproves of extra-marital cohabitation.

Individuals who are openly LGBTQ cannot be ordained, but may hold church office and membership if they are not actively pursuing same-sex relationships. Current church policy states that openly LGBTQ (and "practicing") persons are to be welcomed into the church services and treated with the love and kindness afforded any human being.

The Adventist church has released official statements in relation to other ethical issues such as euthanasia (against active euthanasia but permissive of passive withdrawal of medical support to allow death to occur), birth control (in favor of it for married couples if used correctly, but against abortion as birth control and premarital sex in any case) and human cloning (against it if the technology could result in defective births or abortions).

=== Dress and entertainment ===
Adventists have traditionally held socially conservative attitudes regarding dress and entertainment. These attitudes are reflected in one of the church's fundamental beliefs:

For the Spirit to recreate in us the character of our Lord we involve ourselves only in those things which will produce Christlike purity, health, and joy in our lives. This means that our amusement and entertainment should meet the highest standards of Christian taste and beauty. While recognizing cultural differences, our dress is to be simple, modest, and neat, befitting those whose true beauty does not consist of outward adornment but in the imperishable ornament of a gentle and quiet spirit.

Accordingly, Adventists are opposed to practices such as body piercing and tattoos and refrain from the wearing of jewelry, including such items as earrings and bracelets. Some also oppose the displaying of wedding bands, although banning wedding bands is not the position of the General Conference. In 1986, the North American Division permitted the wearing of wedding rings. Before that, it was a source of friction, since Adventists overseas have worn wedding rings for many decades.

Conservative Adventists avoid certain recreational activities which are considered to be a negative spiritual influence, including dancing, rock music and secular theatre. However, major studies conducted from 1989 onwards found that a majority of North American church youth reject some of these standards.

On June 29, 2000, the General Conference of Seventh-day Adventists adopted a resolution on gambling. The church encourages its members not to gamble and it will not accept funding from it.

=== Youth ministry ===
Missionary work with children and youth begins with the Adventurer club. The Adventurer curriculum is for children aged between 4–9 and it is divided into 6 classes. The objectives of the Adventurer Curriculum are to develop a Christ-like character; to experience the joy and satisfaction of doing things well; to express their love for Jesus in a natural way; to learn good sportsmanship and strengthen their ability to get along with others; to discover their God-given abilities and to learn how to use them to benefit self and serve others; to discover God's world; to improve their understanding of what makes families strong; to develop parental support for the training of children. The club engages in witnessing, community work so as to share the love of Jesus.

Pathfinders is a club for 5th to 10th grade (up to 12th in the Florida Conference) boys and girls. It is similar to and based partly on the Scouting movement. Pathfinders exposes young people to such activities as camping, community service, personal mentorship, and skills-based education, and trains them for leadership in the church. Yearly "Camporees" are held in individual Conferences, where Pathfinders from the region gather and participate in events similar to Boy Scouts' Jamborees.

After a person enters 9th grade, they are eligible to join Teen Leadership Training within Pathfinders. In the 11th grade, typically after being a member of a club, they can become a Pathfinder or Adventurer staff member and begin the "Master Guide" program (similar to Scout Master) which develops leaders for both Adventurers and Pathfinders.

== Organization ==
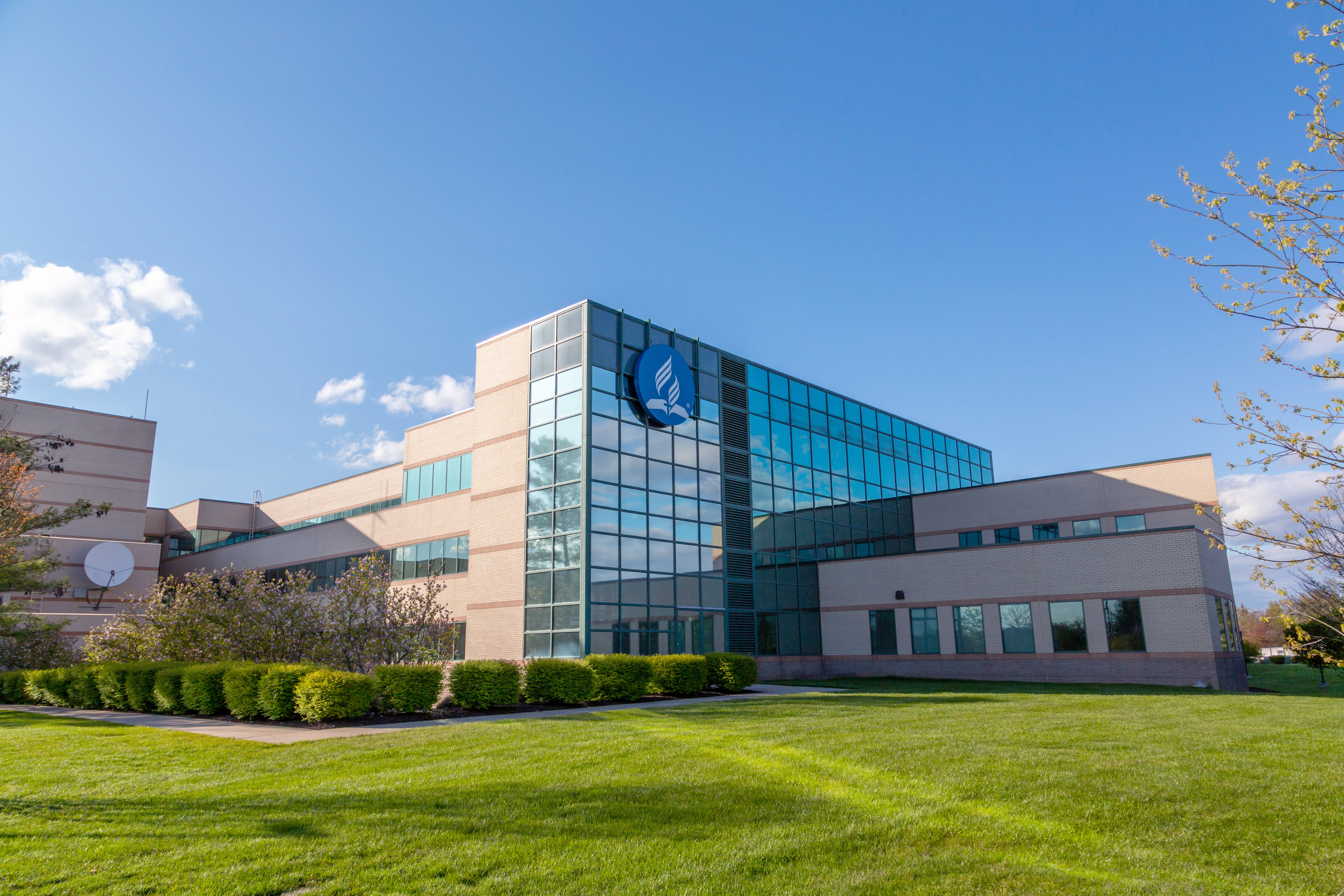
General Conference Headquarters

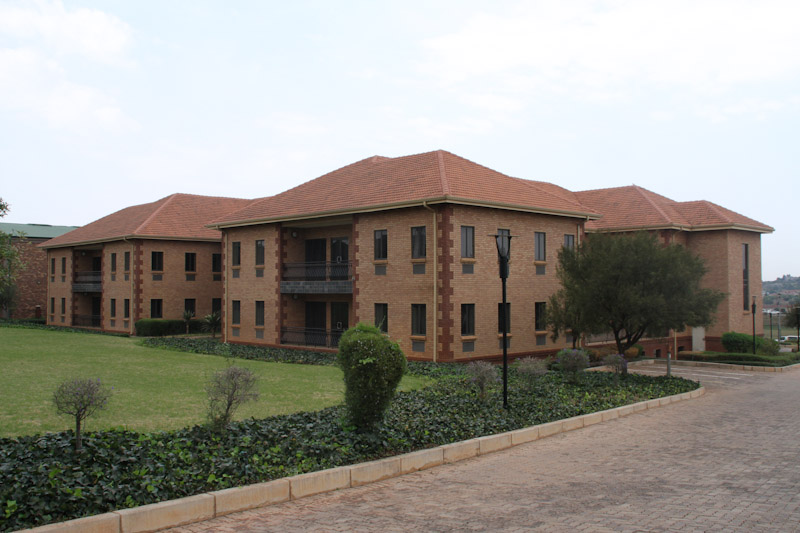
Southern Africa-Indian Ocean Division Headquarters

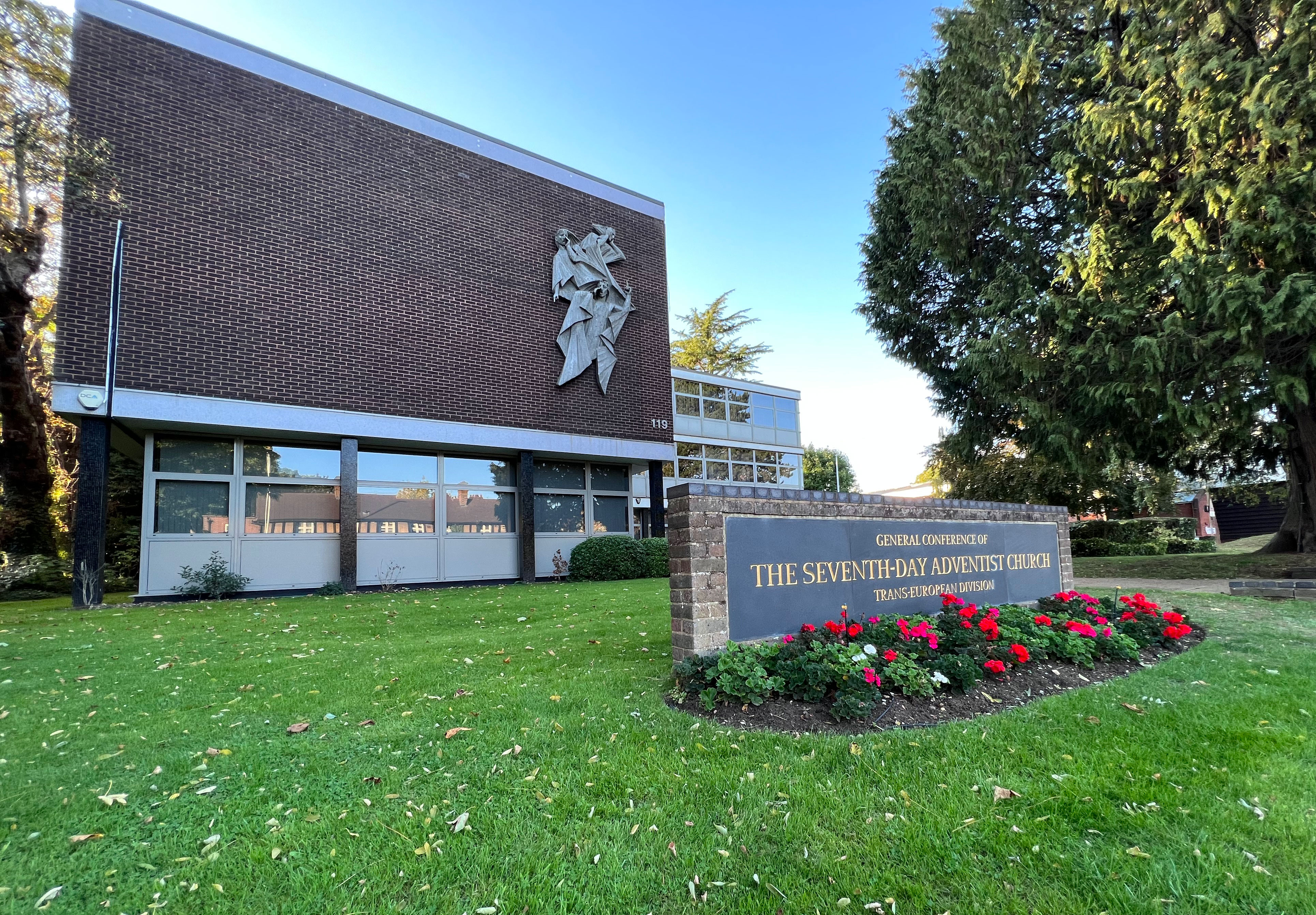
Trans-European Division Headquarters

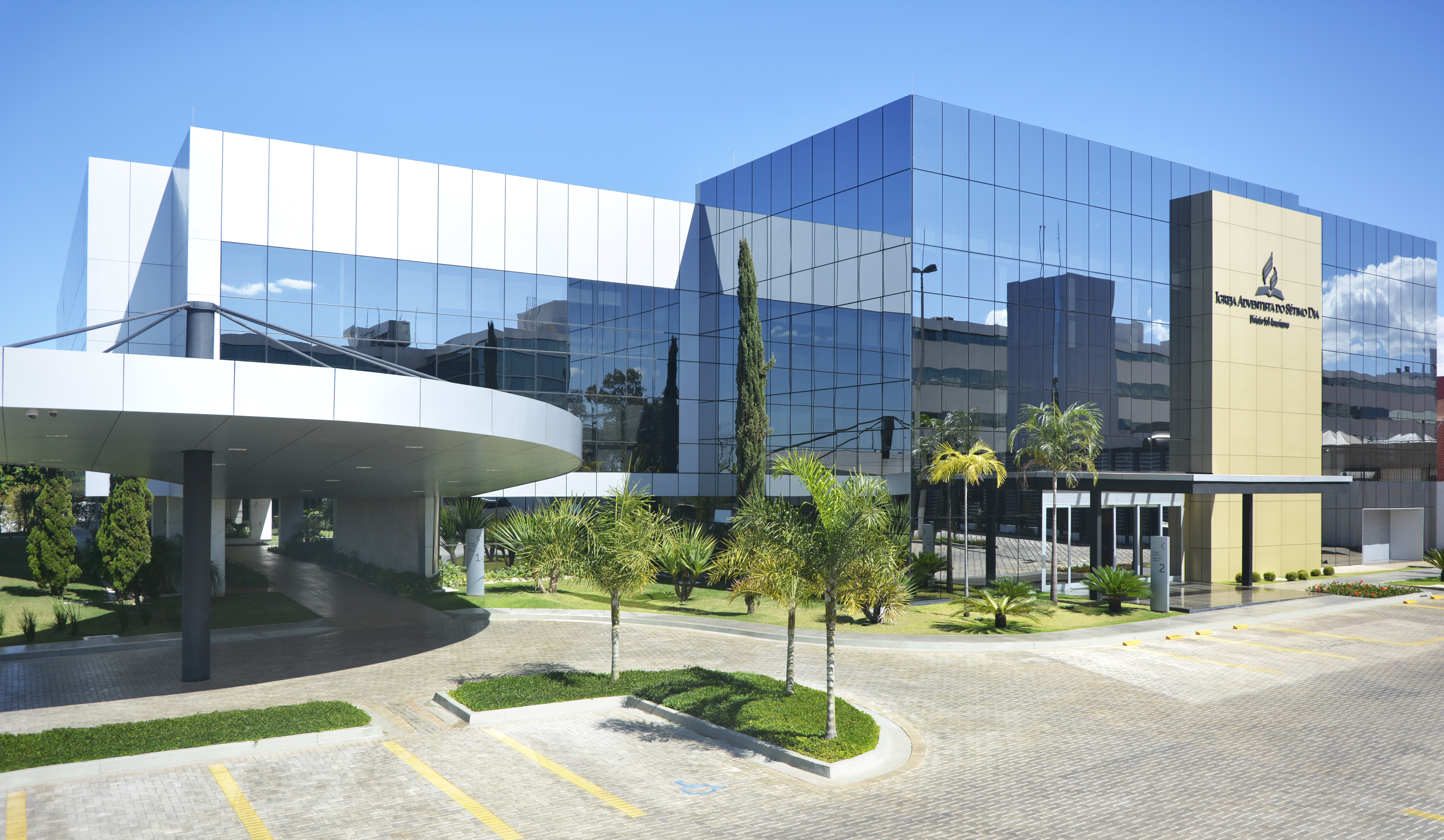
South American Division Headquarters

=== Structure and polity ===
The Seventh-day Adventist church is governed by a form of representation which resembles the presbyterian system of church organization. Four levels of organization exist within the world church.

1. The local church is the foundation level of organizational structure and is the public face of the denomination. Every baptized Adventist is a member of a local church and has voting powers within that church.
2. Directly above the local church is the "local conference". The local conference is an organization of churches within a state, province or territory (or part thereof) which appoints ministers, owns church land and organizes the distribution of tithes and payments to ministers.
3. Above the local conference is the "union conference" which embodies a number of local conferences within a larger territory.
4. The highest level of governance within the church structure is the General Conference which consists of 13 "Divisions", each assigned to various geographic locations. The General Conference is the church authority and has the final say in matters of conjecture and administrative issues. The General Conference is headed by the office of President. The General Conference head office is in Silver Spring, Maryland, United States.

The denomination is organized in a representative form of church government, which means authority arises from the membership of local churches. Each organization is governed by a general "session" which occurs at certain intervals. This is usually when administrative decisions are made. In addition to administering their own congregations, churches send representatives to vote on matters and leaders in a shared local unit of administration. They vote also on who will represent them in a large area, with further representation selected at each successively larger administrative region. Finally, the General Conference elects the executive committee and officers who hold its authority between the decisions of the quinquennial General Conference Session. The president of the General Conference is also elected at the General Conference Session every five years.

Tithes collected from church members are not used directly by the local churches, but are passed upwards to the local conferences which then distribute the finances toward various ministry needs. Employees are compensated "on the basis of the church remuneration policy and practice in effect in the location or country in which they reside".

The Church Manual gives provisions for each level of government to create educational, healthcare, publishing, and other institutions that are seen within the call of the Great Commission.

==== Divisions and attached unions/fields ====
Division	Headquarters location
East-Central Africa Division	Nairobi, Kenya
Euro-Asia Division	Moscow, Russia
Inter-American Division	Miami, United States
Inter-European Division	Bern, Switzerland
North American Division	Columbia, United States
Northern Asia-Pacific Division	Goyang, South Korea
Southern Africa-Indian Ocean Division	Centurion, South Africa
South American Division	Brasília, Brazil
South Pacific Division	Wahroonga, Australia
Southern Asia Division	Hosur, India
Southern Asia-Pacific Division	Silang, Philippines
Trans-European Division	St Albans, United Kingdom
West-Central Africa Division	Abidjan, Ivory Coast

Attached union/field	Headquarters location
Middle East and North Africa Union Mission	Beirut, Lebanon
Israel Field	Jerusalem
Chinese Union Mission	Hong Kong
Ukrainian Union Conference	Kyiv

=== Church officers and clergy ===
The ordained clergy of the Adventist church are known as ministers or pastors. Ministers are neither elected nor employed by the local churches, but instead are appointed by the local Conferences, which assign them responsibility over a single church or group of churches. Ordination is a formal recognition bestowed upon pastors and elders after usually a number of years of service. In most parts of the world, women may not be given the title "ordained", although some are employed in ministry, and may be "commissioned" or "ordained-commissioned". However, beginning in 2012, some unions adopted policies of allowing member conferences to ordain without regard to gender.

A number of lay offices exist within the local church, including the ordained positions of elder and deacon. Elders and deacons are appointed by the vote of a local church business meeting or elected committees. Elders serve a mainly administrative and pastoral role, but must also be capable of providing religious leadership (particularly in the absence of an ordained minister). The role of deacons is to assist in the smooth functioning of a local church and to maintain church property.

=== Ordination of women ===
In 1990, at their General Conference Session leaders of the Seventh-day Adventist Church prevented the ordination of women. They voted 1,173 against and 377 in favor. Those who supported ordaining women were from Europe and North America, while those from Africa, Asia and South America were strongly against. Five years later, it turned down a request by the North American Division that its local conferences be allowed to ordain women.

On July 29, 2012, the Columbia Union Conference, which has its headquarters in Maryland voted 80 percent in favor of ordaining women. On August 19, 2012, the Pacific Union Conference, which has its headquarters in California voted 79 percent to 21 percent in favor of ordaining women. The world leaders of the church were disappointed with the actions of the two conferences and considered their actions not in harmony with the world church. In 2012, there were 320 women pastors in the church, while in North America there are 120 women pastors and 4,100 male pastors. In 2013, the Southeastern California Conference voted for the first time a woman as president.

In July 8, 2015, leaders who represented the Seventh-day Adventist Church voted at their General Conference Session in San Antonio, Texas, against the ordination of women becoming pastors. They voted 1,381 against and 977 in favor. Western Adventists who are against the ban say it is keeping them from functioning in this culture, while those who support the ban get their reason for opposing from the Bible. Adventists in North America, Europe and a few other areas have been ordaining women as pastors. Women are banned from leading local conferences, they also can not create or close churches. Ted N. C. Wilson, who was re-elected for a second five-year term as president, voted no, while former president Jan Paulsen voted yes.

=== Membership ===
The Seventh-day Adventist Church is one of the world's fastest-growing organizations, primarily from membership increases in developing nations. Today much of the church membership reside outside of the United States, with large numbers in Africa, Asia and Latin America.

In 1931, the Seventh-day Adventist Church had 128,313 members in the United States, that number increased to 176,218 members in 1940. In 1950, the church had 237,168 members in the United States, that number increased to 317,852 members in 1960. In 1970, the church had 420,419 members in the United States, that number had increased to 571,141 members in 1980. In 1990, the church had 717,466 members in the United States, that number increased to 880,921 members in 2000.

In 2000, the Philippines the Seventh-day Church had 609,570 members. In 2006, over 25 million people worshiped weekly in Seventh-day Adventist churches around the world. In 2011, it was reported that the Seventh-day Adventist Church was the fastest-growing church in the United States. Released data showed the membership growing by 2.5% in North America, a rapid clip for that part of the world, where many Christian denominations are declining. On the church’s 150th anniversary in April 2013, there were over 17,000,000 members.

In 2010, the Seventh-day Adventist Church had 916,639 members in the Philippines, and it had 1,060,386 members in the United States. In 2013, it was reported that the church lost one in three members over a fifty year period. For every 100 people the church gains, it loses 43 members. According to Adventist minister and research Monte Sahlin, people primarily leave the church due to "personal trouble like marital issues and unemployment." In 2015, the church was the most racially diverse denomination in the United States. The ratio was 37 percent white, 32 percent black, 15 percent Hispanic, 8 percent Asian and 8 percent another or mixed. In 2017, the church claimed to have members in almost every country and territory in the world, except for Brunei, Comoros, Djibouti, Falkland Islands, Iran, Jersey, Maldives, Monaco, Somalia and Tokelau. In 2019, the Seventh-day Adventist Church had 21,000,000 baptized members around the world.

A study comparing 2019 (pre-pandemic) church attendance to 2014 church attendance found that only 32% of Adventist groups in North America reported an increase in attendance over the period, with 36% reporting a decline and 18% reporting no change, a rate of growth slightly lower than an interfaith control sample over the same period. In 2020, church officials reported the lowest membership increase in 16 years, due to the COVID-19 pandemic. The Seventh-day Adventist Church added only 803,000 members, the last time annual membership growth dropped below 1 million was in 2004.

In 2020, the Seventh-day Adventist Church membership in the Philippines had decreased to 862,725. In 2021, the church had 1.2 million members in Canada and the United States. In 2025, the church claimed a membership of 23,000,000 when Erton Köhler was elected the new president of the General Conference.

== Adventist mission ==
Started in the late 19th century, Adventist mission work today reaches people in over 200 countries and territories. Adventist mission workers seek to preach the gospel, promote health through hospitals and clinics, run development projects to improve living standards, and provide relief in times of calamity.

Missionary outreach of the Seventh-day Adventist Church is aimed not only at non-Christians but also at Christians from other denominations. Adventists believe that Christ has called his followers in the Great Commission to reach the whole world. Adventists are cautious, however, to ensure that evangelism does not impede or intrude on the basic rights of the individual. Religious liberty is a stance that the Adventist Church supports and promotes.

=== Education ===
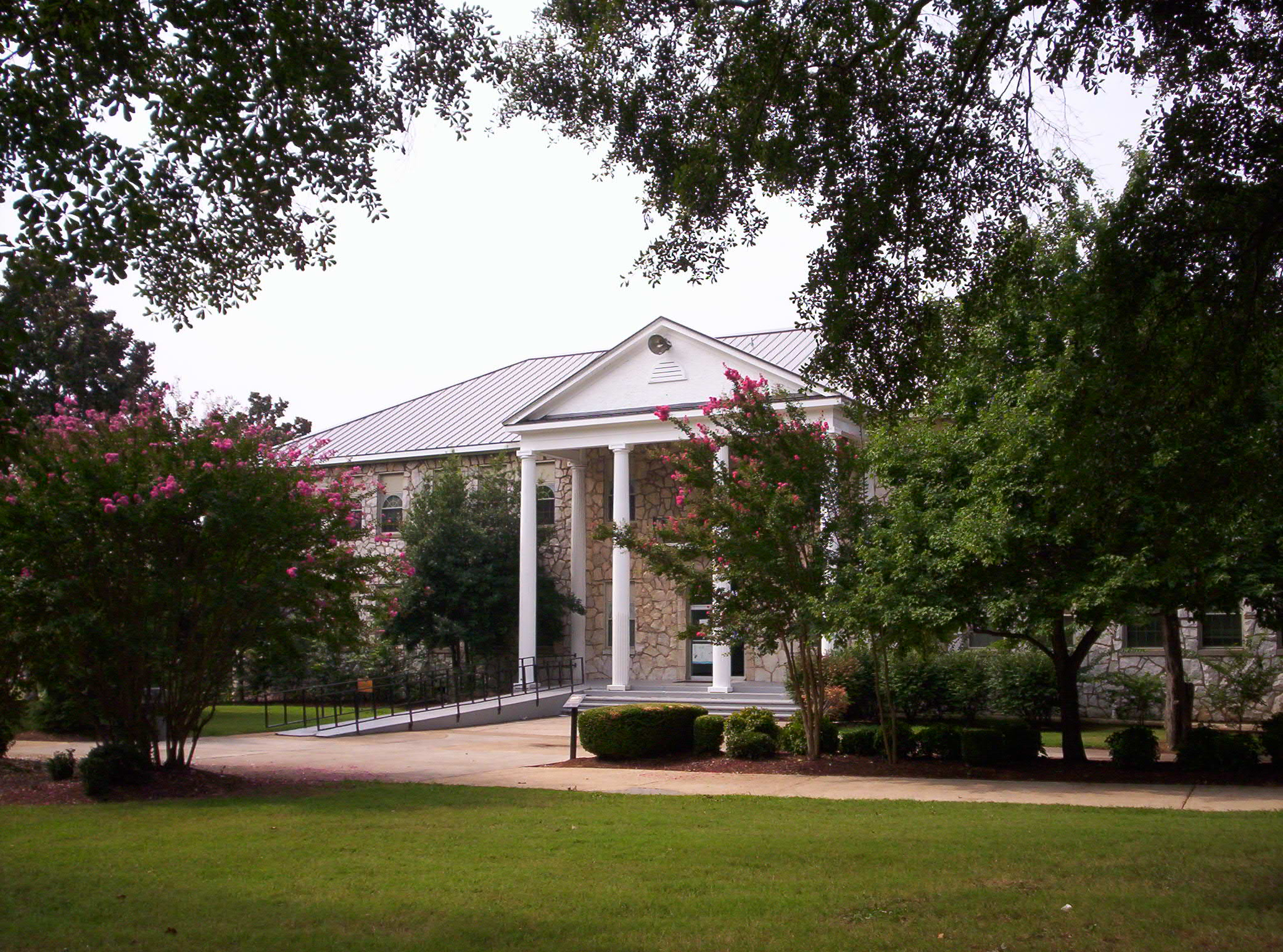
Moran Hall at Oakwood University

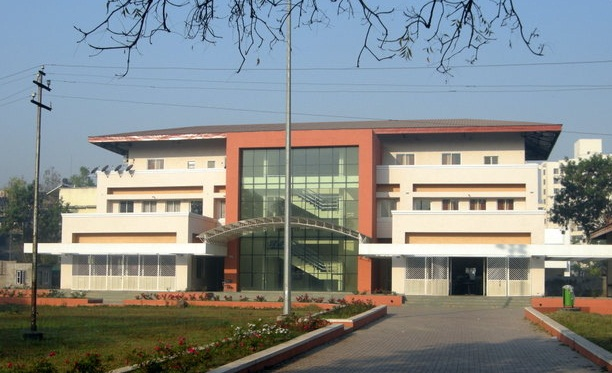
Student Center Building at Spicer Adventist University

Globally, the Adventist Church operates 7,598 schools, colleges and universities, with a total enrollment of more than 1,545,000 and a total teaching staff of approximately 80,000. It operates the second largest school system in the world; only larger is the Roman Catholic Church school system.

=== Medical ===
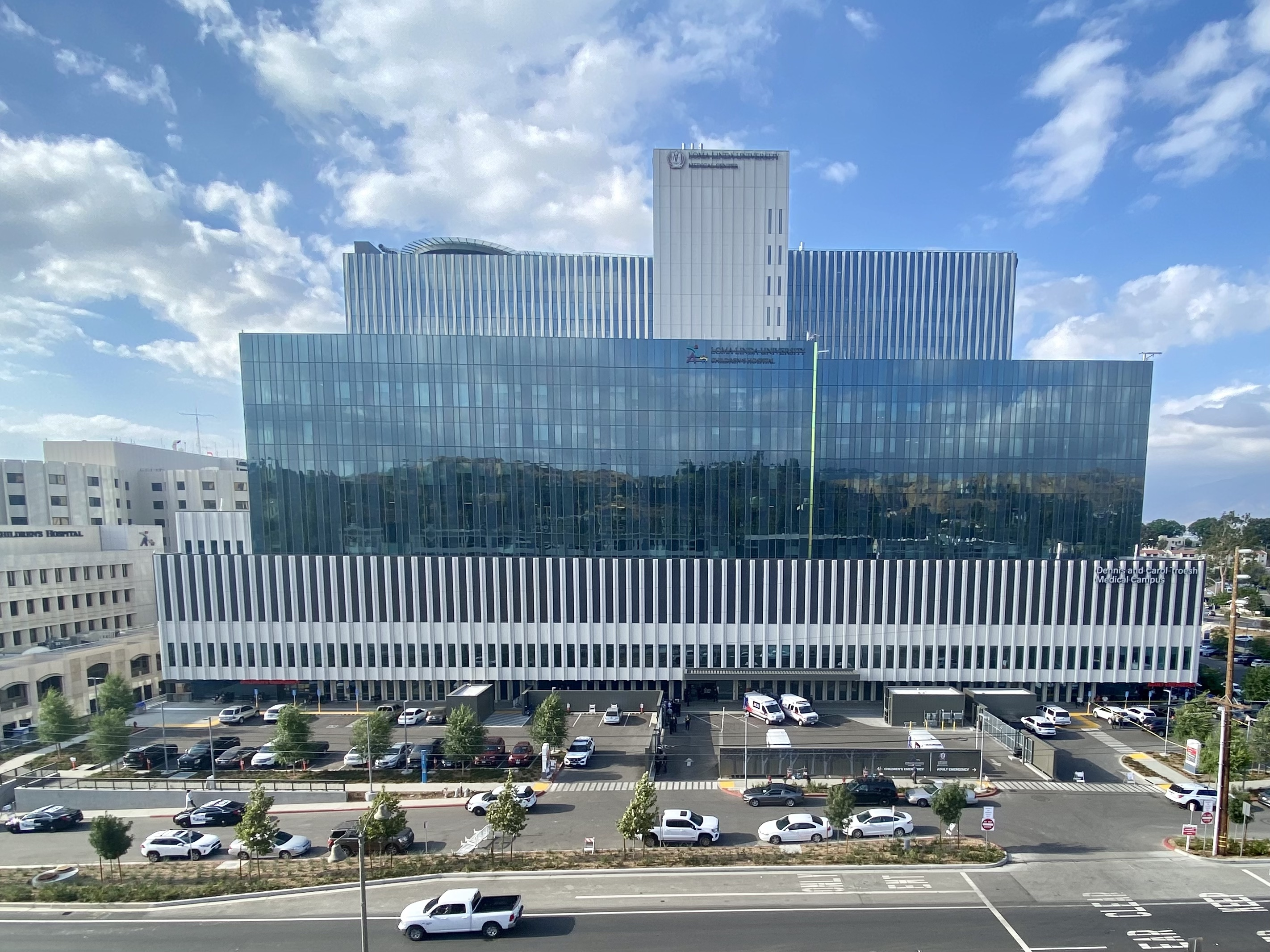
Loma Linda University Medical Center

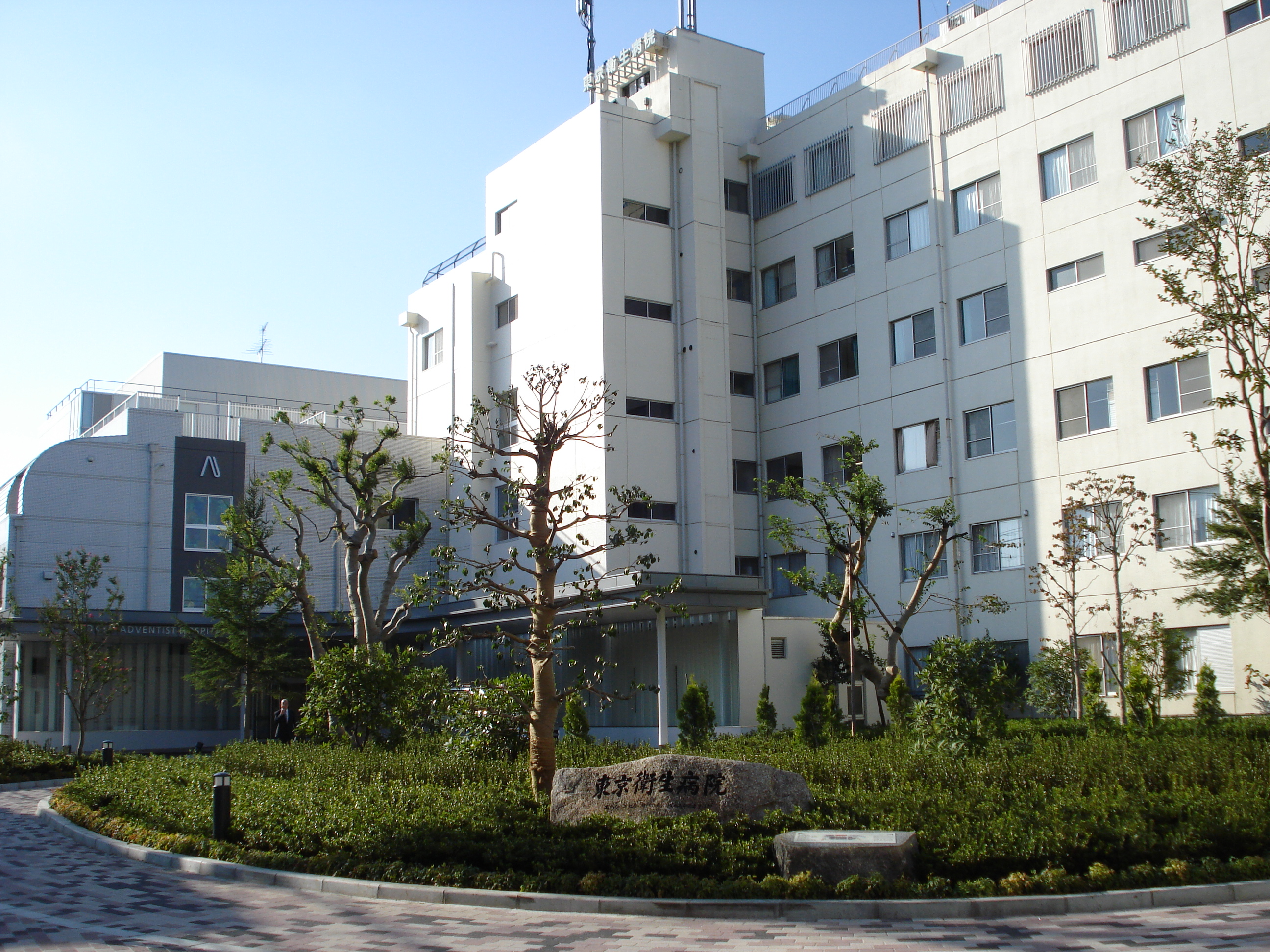
Tokyo Adventist Hospital

Their largest medical school and hospitals in North America are Loma Linda University, Loma Linda University Medical Center and AdventHealth Orlando. Throughout the world, the Seventh-day Adventist Church runs a wide network of hospitals, clinics, lifestyle centers, and sanitariums. These play a role in the church's health message and worldwide missions outreach.

AdventHealth is the largest not-for-profit Protestant health care provider in the United States. it operates 56 hospitals in nine states.

=== Humanitarian aid and the environment ===
For over 50 years, the church has been active in humanitarian aid through the work of the Adventist Development and Relief Agency (ADRA). ADRA works as a non-sectarian relief agency in 125 countries and areas of the world. ADRA has been granted General Consultative Status by the United Nations Economic and Social Council. Worldwide, ADRA employs over 4,000 people to help provide relief in crises as well as development in situations of poverty.

The church embraces an official commitment to the protection and care of the environment as well as taking action to avoid the dangers of climate change: "Seventh-day Adventism advocates a simple, wholesome lifestyle, where people do not step on the treadmill of unbridled over-consumption, accumulation of goods, and production of waste. A reformation of lifestyle is called for, based on respect for nature, restraint in the use of the world's resources, reevaluation of one's needs, and reaffirmation of the dignity of created life."

=== Media ===
Hope Channel logo

Adventists have long been proponents of media-based ministries. Traditional Adventist evangelistic efforts consisted of street missions and the distribution of tracts such as The Present Truth, which was published by James White as early as 1849. Until J. N. Andrews was sent to Switzerland in 1874, Adventist global efforts consisted entirely of the posting of tracts such as White's to various locations.

In the last century, these efforts have also made use of media such as radio and television. The first of these was H. M. S. Richards' radio show Voice of Prophecy, which was initially broadcast in Los Angeles in 1929. Since then, Adventists have been on the forefront of media evangelism; It Is Written, founded by George Vandeman, was the first religious program to air on color television in March 1965 and the first major Christian ministry to utilize satellite uplink technology. Amazing Facts was founded in 1965 by Joe Crews in Baltimore as a radio ministry. Amazing Facts broadcasts Bible Answers Live each Sunday where listeners phone or email Bible questions which are answered live. Amazing Facts has produced three documentaries with Doug Batchelor as host, Cosmic Conflict: The Origin of Evil (2009); Revelation: The Bride, The Beast & Babylon (2013); Armageddon and the Final Events of Bible Prophecy (2025).

In 1971, Adventist World Radio was founded and rented in Portugal its first shortwave radio station. It later constructed its own shortwave radio station on Guam. Adventist World Radio broadcasts in over 100 languages with shortwave radio, podcasts and 1,700+ AM/FM radio stations.

In October 2003, Hope Channel was launched (formerly Adventist Television Network): it is the official television network of the church, in 2024 it operated 80 international channels broadcasting 24 hours a day on cable, satellite, and the internet. Nuevo Tiempo (New Times), a part of the Hope Channel network, is a Spanish Christian TV channel and radio station for Central and South America, it is the Spanish version of the Brazilian channel Novo Tempo. Produced at the Adventist Media Center-Brazil from Nova Friburgo, Rio de Janeiro. There are repeaters stations in Argentina, Bolivia, Chile, Ecuador, Paraguay, Peru & Uruguay. Some of the other languages of Hope Channel are Arabic, Farsi, German, Hindi, Mandarin, Romanian, Russian, Tamil, Teluge and Ukrainian.

In 2005, the documentary The Seventh Day: Revelations from the Lost Pages of History, was produced for LLT Productions with Hal Holbrook as the host. In 2016, the church released the film Tell the World. It was made in collaboration by the Australian Union Conference and South Pacific Division. It starred local actors including Tommie-Amber Pirie as Ellen Harmon.

=== Publishing ===
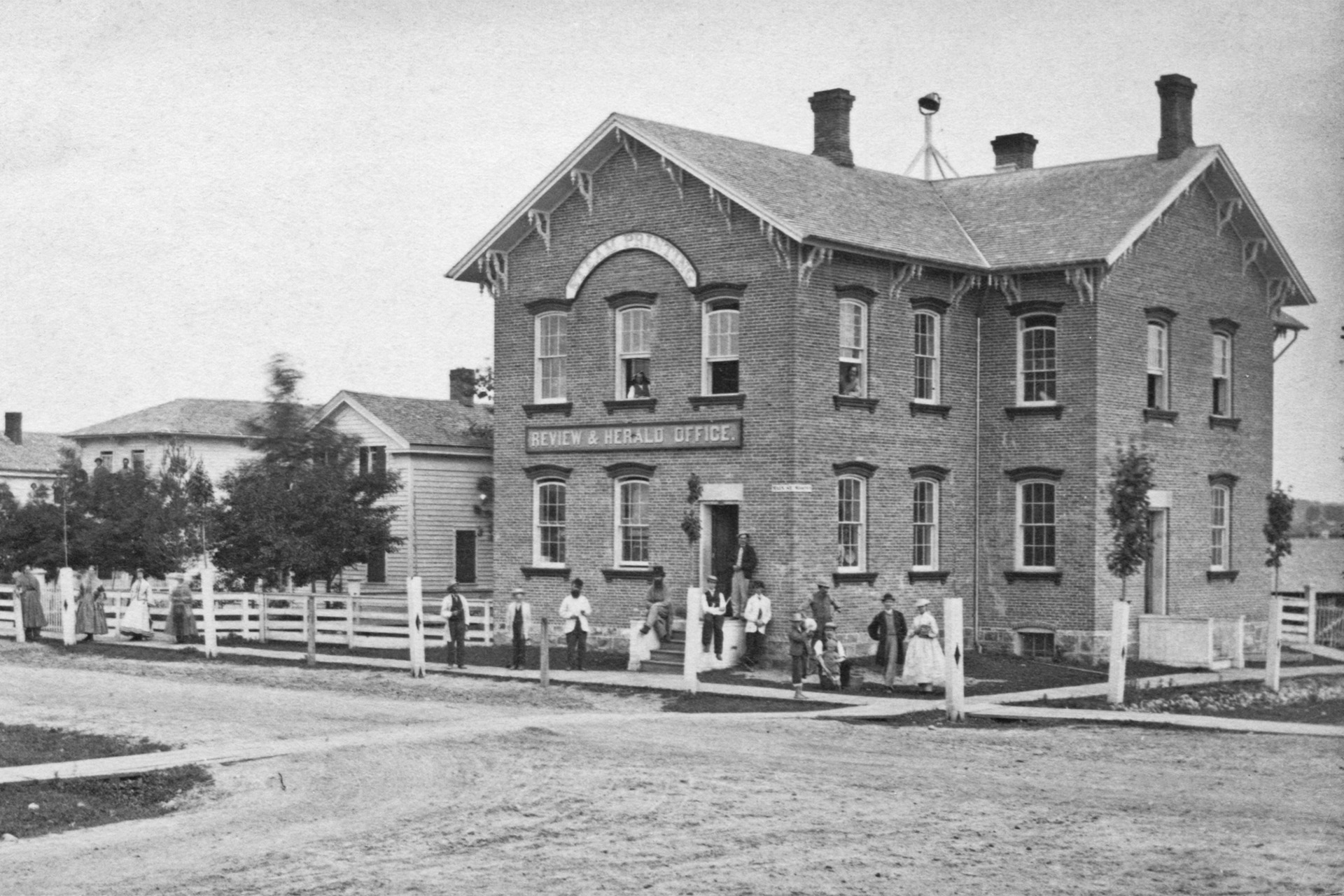
Review and Herald Publishing Association in 1868

The Adventist Church owns and operates 58 publishing companies around the world, in about 136 languages. The major number are in the Trans-European Division (TED), and Inter-European Division (EUD). In 2014, Review and Herald Publishing Association merged with Pacific Press Publishing Association. The Review and Herald board voted 153-to-66 in favor of the merger and the board of Pacific Press voted 42-to-1 in favor of the merger. Review and Herald Publishing Association had been in Hagerstown, Maryland, since 1983. From 2013 to 2014, Review and Herald Publishing Association lost almost US$2 million. Formerly its revenue in 1985 was $45.8 million and dropped to $21.8 million in 2013. Pacific Press had also lost much revenue. Pacific Press Publishing Association was in Mountain View, California from 1904 to 1983. It moved to Nampa, Idaho, to reduce the cost of living for new employees.

=== Ecumenical activity ===
The Adventist Church generally opposes the ecumenical movement, although it supports some of the other goals of ecumenism. The General Conference has released an official statement concerning the Adventist position with respect to the ecumenical movement, which contains the following paragraph:

Should Adventists cooperate ecumenically? Adventists should cooperate insofar as the authentic gospel is proclaimed and crying human needs are being met. The Seventh-day Adventist Church wants no entangling memberships and refuses any compromising relationships that might tend to water down her distinct witness. However, Adventists wish to be "conscientious cooperators". The ecumenical movement as an agency of cooperation has acceptable aspects; as an agency for the organic unity of churches, it is much more suspect.

While not being a member of the World Council of Churches, the Adventist Church has participated in its assemblies in an observer capacity.

== Criticism ==
The Adventist Church has received criticism along several lines, including what some claim are heterodox doctrines, Ellen G. White and her status within the church, and alleged exclusivist issues.

=== Doctrines ===
Several teachings that have come under scrutiny are the annihilationist view of hell, the investigative judgment (and a related view of the atonement), soul sleep and the Sabbath. Critics such as evangelical Anthony Hoekema (who felt that Adventists were more in agreement with Arminianism) argued that some Adventist doctrines were heterodox. In addition, Hoekema also claimed that Adventist doctrine suffers from legalism.

While critics such as Hoekema have classified Adventism as a sectarian group on the basis of its atypical doctrines, it has been accepted as more mainstream by Protestant evangelicals since its meetings and discussions with evangelicals in the 1950s. Billy Graham invited Adventists to be part of his crusades after Eternity, a conservative Christian magazine edited by Donald Barnhouse, asserted in 1956 that Adventists are Christians. He also later stated, "They are sound on the great New Testament doctrines including grace and redemption through the vicarious offering of Jesus Christ 'once for all'". Walter Martin, who is considered by many to be the father of the counter-cult apologetics movement within evangelicalism, authored The Truth About Seventh-day Adventists (1960) which marked a turning point in the way Adventism was viewed: "It is perfectly possible to be a Seventh-day Adventist and be a true follower of Jesus Christ despite heterodox concepts".

Later on, Martin planned to write a new book on Seventh-day Adventism, with the assistance of Kenneth R. Samples. Samples subsequently authored "From Controversy to Crisis: An Updated Assessment of Seventh-day Adventism", which upholds Martin's view "for that segment of Adventism which holds to the position stated in Questions on Doctrine (QOD), and further expressed in the Evangelical Adventist movement of the last few decades." However, Samples also claimed that "Traditional Adventism" appeared "to be moving further away from a number of positions taken in QOD", and at least at Glacier View seemed to have "gained the support of many administrators and leaders".

=== Ellen G. White and her status ===
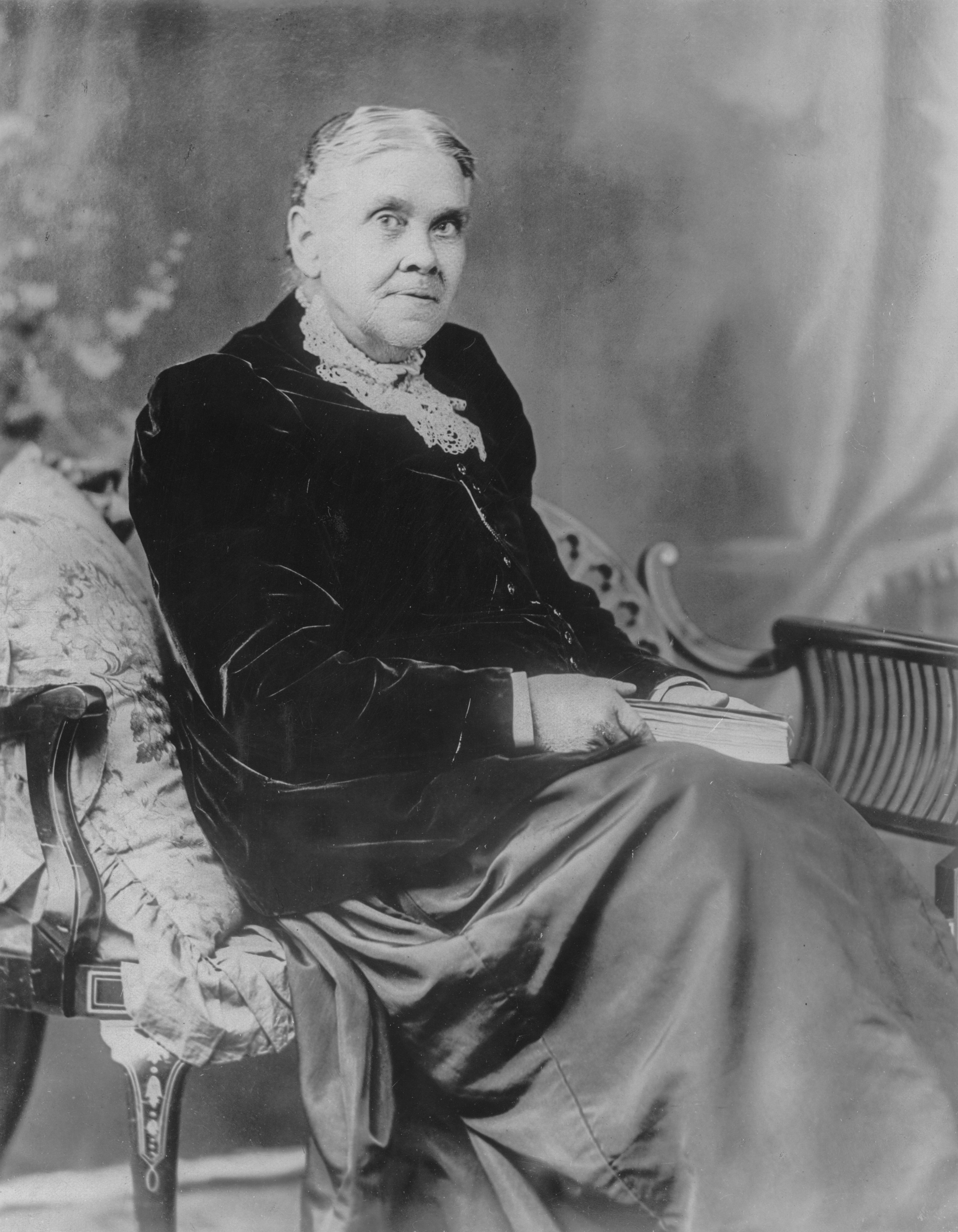
Ellen G. White in 1899

Ellen G. White's status as a modern-day prophet has also been criticized. In the Questions on Doctrine era, evangelicals expressed concern about Adventism's understanding of the relationship of White's writings to the inspired canon of Scripture. The Adventist fundamental beliefs maintain that "the Bible is the standard by which all teaching and experience must be tested".

A common criticism of Ellen White, widely popularized by Walter T. Rea, Ronald Numbers, and others, is the claim of plagiarism from other authors. An independent lawyer specializing in plagiarism, Vincent L. Ramik, was engaged to undertake a study of Ellen G. White's writings during the early 1980s and concluded that they were "conclusively unplagiaristic [sic]". When the plagiarism charge ignited a significant debate during the late 1970s and early 1980s, the Adventist General Conference commissioned a major study by Fred Veltman. The ensuing project became known as the "Life of Christ' Research Project". Veltman examined 15 randomly selected chapters of The Desire of Ages for evidence of literary dependence and concluded, "On an average we may say that 31.4 percent of the DA text is dependent to some extent on literary sources." The results are available at the General Conference Archives. Roger W. Coon, David J. Conklin, Denis Fortin, King and Morgan, and Morgan, among others, undertook the refutation of the accusations of plagiarism. At the conclusion of his report, Ramik states:

It is impossible to imagine that the intention of Ellen G. White, as reflected in her writings and the unquestionably prodigious efforts involved therein, was anything other than a sincerely motivated and unselfish effort to place the understandings of Biblical truths in a coherent form for all to see and comprehend. Most certainly, the nature and content of her writings had but one hope and intent, namely, the furthering of mankind's understanding of the word of God. Considering all factors necessary in reaching a just conclusion on this issue, it is submitted that the writings of Ellen G. White were conclusively unplagiaristic.

=== Exclusivism ===
Critics have alleged that certain Adventist beliefs and practices are exclusivist in nature, and they point to the Adventist claim to be the "remnant church", and the traditional Protestant association of Roman Catholicism with "Babylon". These attitudes are said to legitimize the proselytising of Christians from other denominations. In response to such criticisms, Adventist theologians have stated that the doctrine of the remnant does not preclude the existence of genuine Christians in other denominations but is concerned with institutions.

== Offshoots and schisms ==
Throughout the denomination's history, several groups have left the church and formed their own movements.

Following World War I, a group known as the Seventh Day Adventist Reform Movement was formed as a result of the actions of L. R. Conradi and certain European church leaders during the war, who decided that it was acceptable for Adventists to take part in said war. Those who opposed this stand and refused to participate in the war were declared "disfellowshipped" by their local Church leaders at the time. When the Church leaders from the General Conference came and admonished the local European leaders after the war to try to heal the damage, and bring the members together, it met with resistance from those who had suffered under those leaders. Their attempts at reconciliation failed after the war, and the group became organized as a separate church at a conference held on July 14–20, 1925. The movement was officially incorporated in 1949.

In 2005, in another attempt to examine and resolve what its German leaders had done, the mainstream church apologized for its failures during World War II, stating that they "'deeply regret' any participation in or support of Nazi activities during the war by the German and Austrian leadership of the church."

In the Soviet Union, the same issues produced the group known as the True and Free Seventh-day Adventists. This also formed as the result of a schism within the Seventh-day Adventist Church in Europe during World War I over the position its European church leaders took on having its members join the military or keep the Sabbath. The group remains active today in the former republics of the Soviet Union.

Well-known but distant offshoots are the Davidian Seventh-day Adventist organization and the Branch Davidians, themselves a schism within the larger Davidian movement. The Davidians formed in 1929, following Victor Houteff, after he published his book The Shepherd's Rod, which was rejected as heretical. A succession dispute after Houteff died in 1955 led to the formation of two groups, the original Davidians and the Branches. Later, another ex-Adventist, David Koresh, led the Branch Davidians until he died in the 1993 siege at the group's headquarters near Waco, Texas.

== Cultural influence ==
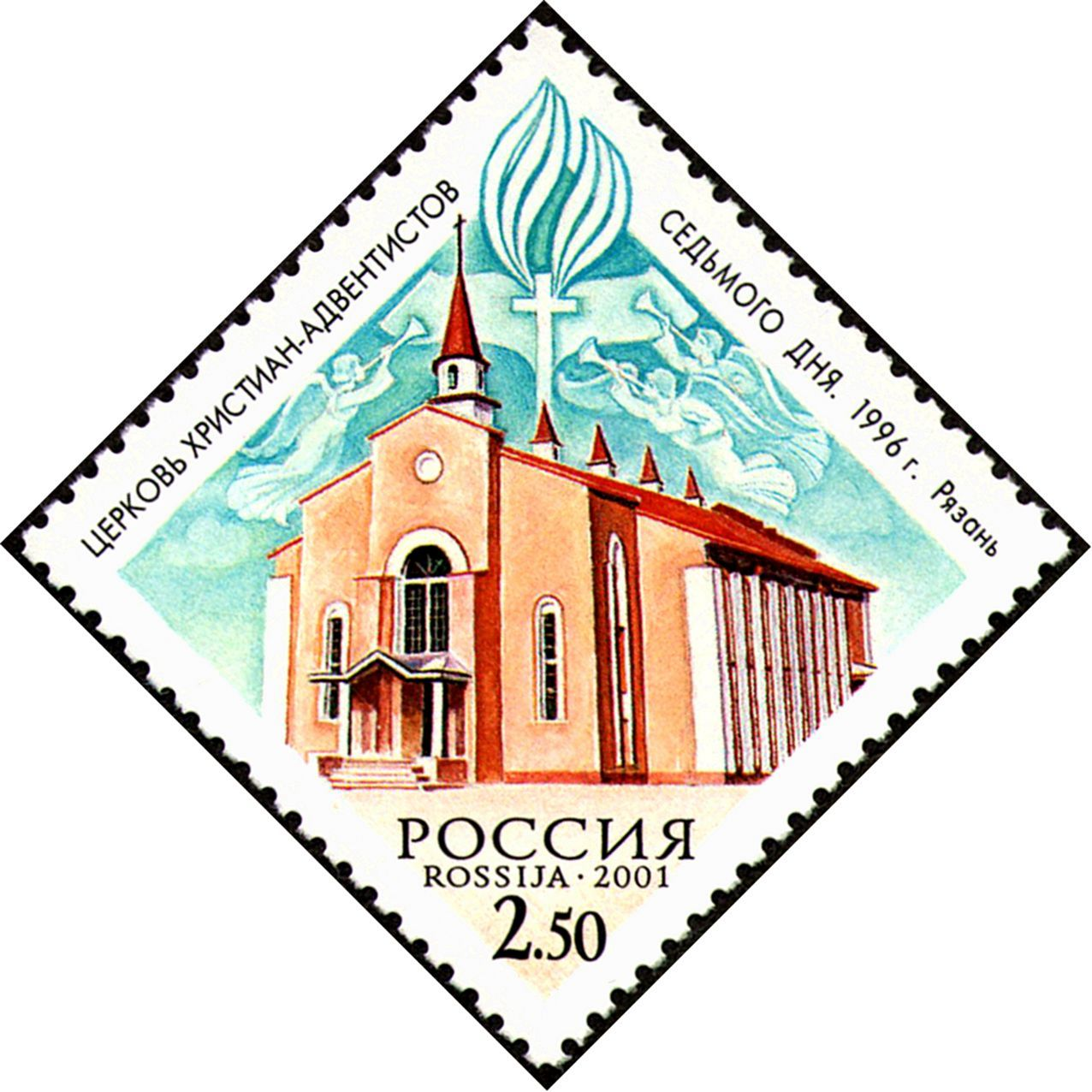
Postage stamp of the Seventh-day Adventist Church in Ryazan

Hacksaw Ridge depicts the life of Adventist conscientious objector and Medal of Honor recipient Desmond Doss. The Road to Wellville is based on a novel about Seventh-day Adventist physician John Harvey Kellogg, director of the Battle Creek Sanitarium. A Cry in the Dark, a film about the death of Azaria Chamberlain, features the prejudice her parents faced due to misconceptions about their religion. Many other forms of media include mentions of Seventh-day Adventism.

Many country postal services around the world have created postage stamps honoring the Seventh-day Adventist Church, or an individual member. In 2020, Iraqi Post released a set of eight commemorative stamps to honor the Christian churches in the country. The set included a photograph of the Baghdad Seventh-day Adventist Church.

== See also ==
- List of the largest Protestant denominations
- History of Seventh-day Adventist freedom of religion in Canada
- List of Seventh-day Adventist periodicals
- Prophecy in the Seventh-day Adventist Church

By geographic region

- Canada: Seventh-day Adventist Church in Canada
- Germany: Seventh-day Adventist Church in Germany
- Italy: Italian Union of Seventh-day Adventist Christian Churches
- Poland: Seventh-day Adventist Church in Poland
- Romania: Romanian Union Conference of Seventh-day Adventists
- Tonga: Seventh-day Adventist Church in Tonga
