= James R. Nix =

James Rosco Nix
- Born: 1947 (age 78–79)
- Occupations: Seventh-day Adventist; Preacher

James Rosco Nix (born 1947) was director of the Ellen G. White Estate from 2000-2020. As a young person he developed a collection of rare early Seventh-day Adventist materials and interviewed individuals who remembered Ellen G. White. Nix is recognized as a consummate storyteller of early Adventism who has worked tirelessly to protect Ellen White's writings.

== Education ==
Nix graduated in 1969 from La Sierra University with a dual major in history and theology. In 1972 he earned an M.Div. degree from Andrews University and a degree in library science.

== Ellen G. White Estate ==
In 1972 Loma Linda University hired Nix to develop a Heritage Room of which he became director in 1974. Two years later he supervised the opening of an Ellen G. White Estate Research Center, which became a Branch Office of the White Estate in 1985. He was ordained as a Seventh-day Adventist minister in 1994 and became director of the Ellen G. White Estate in 2000. His leadership has been noted by his strong reticence to have Ellen G. White's unpublished writings made available. In 2015 Nix was responsible for opening a "world class" visitor center at the Seventh-day Adventist world church headquarters, the fulfillment of a lifelong dream. In 2020 he retired as director of the Ellen G. White Estate.

== Adventist Heritage Ministry ==
In 1981 he co-founded Adventist Historic Properties, Inc., now known as Adventist Heritage Ministry, and currently serves as chair of its board. In 1994 he organized the sesquicentennial commemoration of the Great Disappointment held at the William Miller Farm. He has been intimately involved in the purchase of a series of historic properties owned by Adventist Heritage Ministry.

== Personal life ==
James Rosco Nix married Mary K. Thesman and they later divorced in 1977. They have a daughter and one grandson. He married his second wife Mindi Nix and they reside in Maryland.

== Publications ==
Nix has authored or contributed to several books including Early Advent Singing, Laughter and Tears of the Pioneers, and In the Footprints of the Pioneers. His writings are generally considered strongly apologetic and promote a hagiographical view of Adventist history.

== See also ==
- 28 Fundamental Beliefs
- Adventism
- Adventist Heritage Ministry
- Conditional Immortality
- Historicism
- History of the Seventh-day Adventist Church
- Inspiration of Ellen G. White
- Investigative judgment
- Pillars of Adventism
- Prophecy in the Seventh-day Adventist Church
- Questions on Doctrine
- Sabbath in seventh-day churches
- Second Coming
- Seventh-day Adventist Church
- Seventh-day Adventist Church Pioneers
- Seventh-day Adventist eschatology
- Seventh-day Adventist theology
- Seventh-day Adventist worship
- Teachings of Ellen G. White
- Three Angels' Messages

Preceded by Juan Carlos Viera	Secretary of the Ellen G. White Estate; 2000–2020	Succeeded by Merlin D. Burt
