= 1998 in art =

Events from the year 1998 in art.

== Events ==
- April – Fans of Newcastle United F.C. decorate the newly erected Angel of the North sculpture with a giant replica of Alan Shearer's no. 9 shirt. Police remove the shirt after about twenty minutes.
- 3 December – 44 governments participating in the Washington Conference on Holocaust-Era Assets approve the Washington Principles on Nazi-Confiscated Art (or "Washington Declaration"), requiring efforts to be made to restore looted art to its original owners or their heirs.
- Gemäldegalerie, Berlin (in the Kulturforum), designed by Heinz Hilmer and Christoph Sattler, opens.

== Exhibitions ==
- 1 November – Jackson Pollock retrospective opens at MoMA.

== Awards ==
- Archibald Prize – Lewis Miller, Portrait of Allan Mitelman No 3
- Arts & Cultural Council for Greater Rochester Artist of the Year – Wendell Castle
- Gran Prix d'Antoine Pevsner – Constantine Andreou
- Hugo Boss Prize – Douglas Gordon
- Turner Prize – Chris Ofili

== Works ==
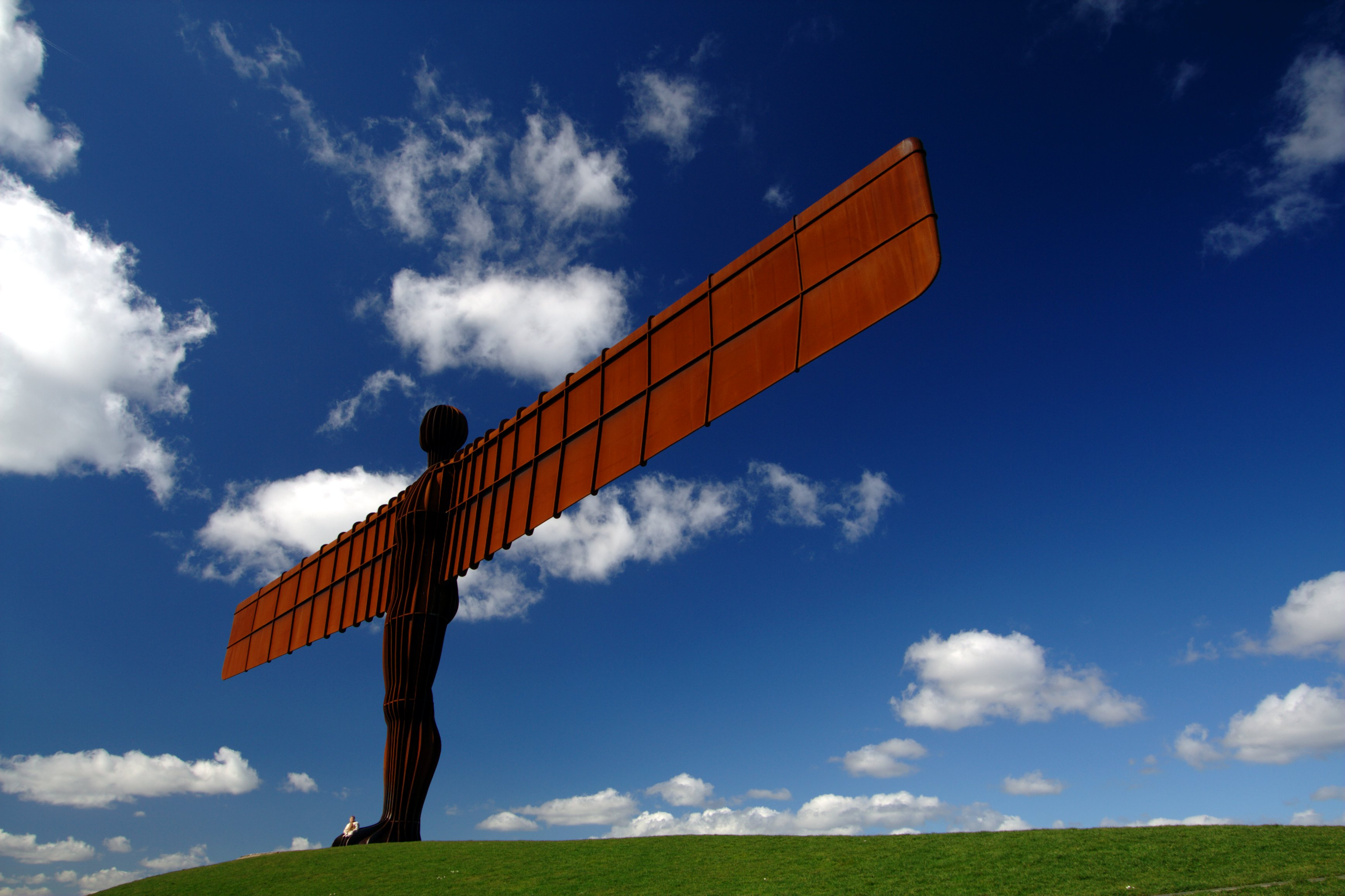
16 February – Angel of the North unveiled in England

- Mark Calderon – Floribunda (bronze, Portland, Oregon)
- Alan Collins – Legacy of Leadership (bronze, Berrien Springs, Michigan)
- Michael Condron – Martian tripod (Woking, England)
- Martin Creed – Work No 200: Half the air in a given space
- Anthony Gormley – Angel of the North
- David Hockney – A Bigger Grand Canyon
- Alexander McQueen – Joan (fashion collection and show, London, February 25)
- Mary Miss – Framing Union Square in the 14th Street–Union Square station in New York City
- Ron Mueck – Ghost
- Chris Ofili – No Woman No Cry
- Valerie Otani – Folly Bollards (bronzes, Portland, Oregon)
- Stephen Robin – Federal Triangle Flowers (sculptures, Washington, D.C.)
- Edwina Sandys - Eve's Apple permanently installed in Windsor, Ontario
- Piotr Uklański – The Nazis
- Rachel Whiteread – Water Tower (New York City)

== Publications ==
- Fossi, Gloria (1998). Botticelli. Primavera (Inglese ed.). Giunti Editore Firenze Italy. ISBN 978-88-09-21459-0.
- Boyd, William (1998). Nat Tate: An American Artist 1928–1960. Cambridge: 21 Publishing. ISBN 1-901785-01-7. A hoax biography, launched on 1 April.

== Deaths ==
- 23 January – Victor Pasmore, English artist and architect (b. 1908)
- 29 January - Karin Jonzen, British sculptor (b. 1914)
- 7 March – Karen Holtsmark, Norwegian painter (b. 1907)
- 12 March – Beatrice Wood, American artist and ceramicist (b. 1893)
- 13 March – Bill Reid, Canadian artist (b. 1920)
- 3 April – Wolf Vostell, German painter and sculptor (b. 1932)
- 7 April – James McIntosh Patrick, Scottish landscape painter (b. 1907)
- 25 April – Wright Morris, American novelist, photographer, and essayist (b. 1910)
- 3 May – Otto Bettmann, German American image archivist (b. 1903)
- 6 May – Sybil Connolly, Welsh-Irish fashion designer (b. 1921)
- 18 May – Enid Marx, English textile designer (b. 1902)
- June – Kali, Polish-American portrait painter and Polish Resistance agent during World War II (b. 1918)
- 8 October – Zhang Chongren, Chinese artist and sculptor (b. 1907)
- 25 October – Dick Higgins, English composer, poet, printer and early Fluxus artist (b. 1938)
- 3 November – Bob Kane, American comic book artist and writer (b. 1915)
- 13 November – Claude Serre, French cartoonist (b. 1938)
- 2 December – Brian Stonehouse, English painter and Special Operations Executive agent during World War II (b. 1918)
- 30 December – Joan Brossa, Catalan poet, playwright, graphic designer and plastic artist (b. 1919)
