= Paul Gordon =

Paul Gordon may refer to:

- Paul Gordon (basketball) (1927–2002), American basketball player
- Paul Gordon (hurler) (born 1990), Irish hurler
- Paul Gordon (composer) (born c. 1954), composer-lyricist of Jane Eyre and other musicals
- Paul Gordon (musician) (1963–2016), American keyboardist and guitarist
- Paul A. Gordon (1930–2009), Seventh-day Adventist and former director of the Ellen G. White Estate

== See also ==
- Paul Gordan (1837–1912), German mathematician
