= Lauren Woodland =

American actress, attorney (b. 1977)

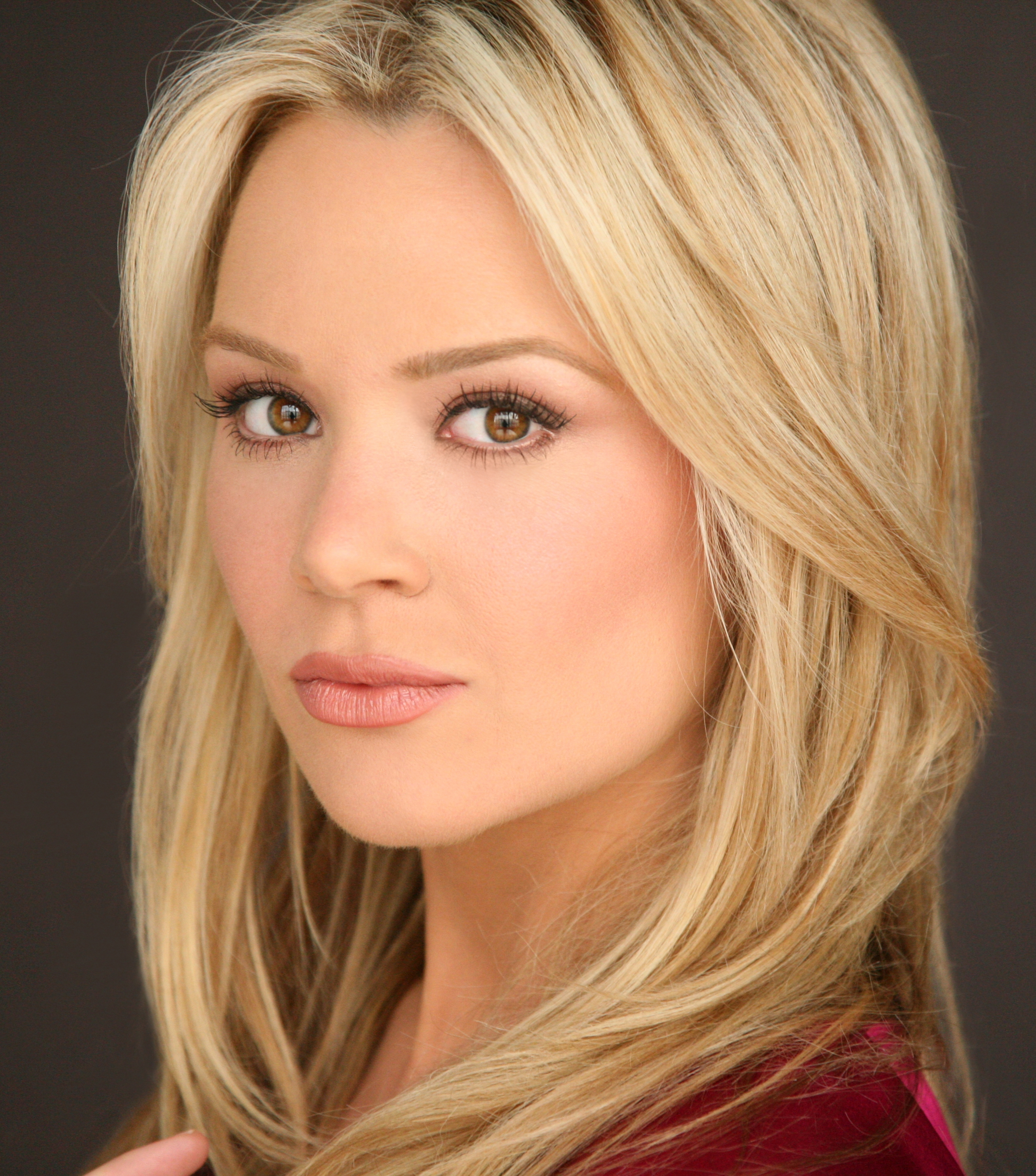
- Woodland in 2008
- Born: October 28, 1977 (age 48); Carson City, Nevada
- Education: University of Southern California (BA); University of California, Los Angeles (JD)
- Occupations: Actress, attorney
- Years active: 1985–present
- Awards: Daytime Emmy Award nomination
- Website: laurenwoodland.com

Lauren Woodland (born October 28, 1977) is an American attorney and semi-retired actress. Before entering the field of law, she appeared in more than 50 commercials, guest starred in more than 20 television programs and starred as a series regular in four television series. She starred as Emily Francisco in Alien Nation from 1989 to 1990 and reprised her role in the five television film sequels from 1994 to 1997. She received a Daytime Emmy Award nomination for her role as Brittany Hodges in the CBS daytime soap The Young and the Restless. She is an attorney with the law firm Novian & Novian, LLP.

== Education ==
Woodland attended the Highly Gifted Magnet at North Hollywood High School from 1992 to 1995. She spent her summers in high school attending programs at the Boston Ballet and the Royal Academy of Dramatic Art in London. After graduating from high school, she attended the Tisch School of the Arts at New York University before transferring to the University of Southern California where she graduated magna cum laude with a major in history and a minor in religion. In 2011, she obtained a J.D. degree from the UCLA School of Law where she served as managing editor of the UCLA Entertainment Law Review.

== Acting career ==
Woodland has been acting since childhood. From 1989 to 1990, she appeared in the science fiction series Alien Nation as the child newcomer Emily Francisco. She reprised her role in the five Alien Nation TV movies, from 1994 to 1997. She appeared as the 12-year-old Jamie Spontini in the 1990 Quantum Leap episode "The Great Spontini".

Woodland has numerous soap opera credits, including a short stint 1998 as the role of Sara Cummings on the soap opera Sunset Beach (however she was replaced by Shawn Batten almost immediately), a role as Janelle on Port Charles in February 1999, and as Brittany Hodges on The Young and the Restless which she portrayed from March 2000 until November 2005 and she returned to the role in 2018 and 2020. She also appeared on Cold Case in the episode "Stand Up and Holler" which premiered April 1, 2007.

=== Awards and nominations ===
Year	Award	Work	Result	Ref
1990	Young Artist Award for Best Young Actress Supporting Role in a Television Series	Alien Nation	Nominated	
2004	Daytime Emmy Award for Outstanding Younger Actress in a Drama Series	The Young and the Restless	Nominated	

== Legal career ==
After earning the Juris Doctor degree from UCLA School of Law in 2011, Woodland worked as an associate at the international law firm White & Case LLP, moving to Novian & Novian, LLP where she is Senior Counsel. She is Vice-Chair of the American Bar Association, Business and Corporate Litigation Committee Business Torts Subcommittee, Business Law Section.

== Personal life ==
Woodland was born on October 28, 1977, in Carson City, Nevada. She received her first acting role when she was just 6 years old (an Oscar Mayer Weiner hot dog commercial) and moved to Southern California to pursue an acting career. Her family already had a distinguished history in California: her great-grandaunt was Julia Morgan, architect of Hearst Castle.

She is active in her support of the arts and in helping aspiring young actors. She serves as Vice-President of the Los Angeles Dance Company, a neo-classical and contemporary dance company, founded by former American Ballet Theater soloist Marie-France Lévesque, dedicated to supporting and advancing the art of dance.

Lauren is also a member of the board of directors of the Castro Organ Devotees Association, a San Francisco nonprofit organization founded by David Hegarty, dedicated to keeping the art of organ music alive through the acquisition and restoration of the Wurlitzer pipe organ in the Castro Theatre, San Francisco.
