= Floribunda =

Floribunda may refer to:

== Plants ==
- Floribunda (genus), a genus in the family Cactaceae
- Cassia floribunda, a synonym for Senna septemtrionalis, a plant species in the family Fabaceae
- Nuytsia floribunda, Western Australian Christmas tree
- Floribunda (rose), a popular garden rose cultivar group

== Other uses ==
- Floribunda (horse), a thoroughbred racehorse
- Floribunda (sculpture), a 1998 bronze sculpture in Portland, Oregon
