= Makeda Antoine-Cambridge =

Trinidad and Tobago ambassador

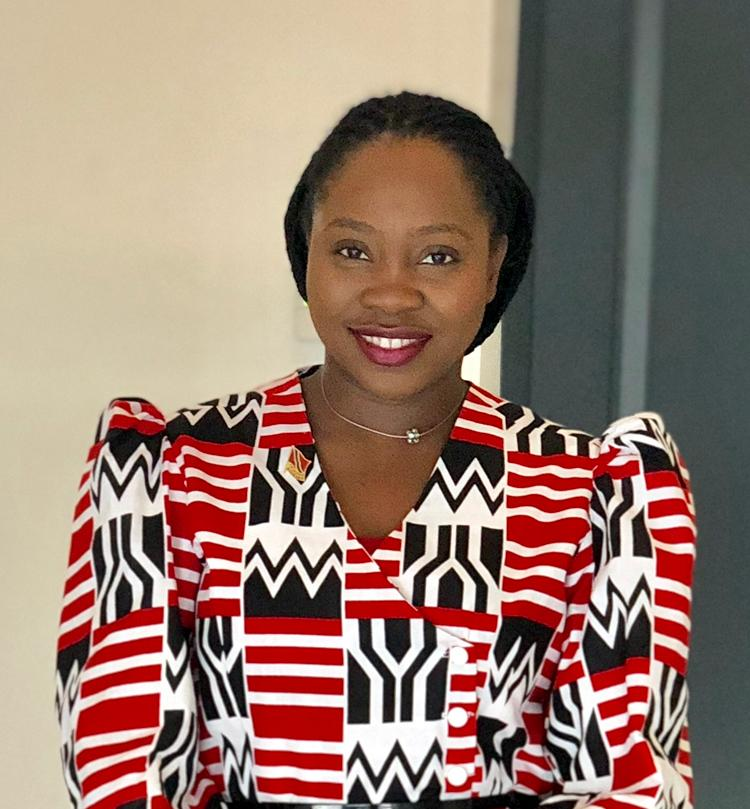

The Permanent Mission of Trinidad and Tobago to the United Nations, Geneva
- Incumbent
- Assumed office November 15, 2017
- Prime Minister: Keith Rowley

Personal details
- Born: Makeda Antoine; December 31, 1978 (age 47)
- Education: University of Bradford, UK Andrews University, Michigan

Makeda Lizanna Kefima Antoine-Cambridge (born December 31, 1978) was the ambassador and permanent representative of Trinidad and Tobago to the United Nations.

Antoine-Cambridge earned a Masters of Science from the University of Bradford, and an MBA from Andrews University. In 2013 she founded Genesis International Limited, Trinidad and Tobago. On May 31, 2018, she was appointed as an ambassador of Trinidad and Tobago to the United Nations Office at Vienna.
