= Federal Triangle Flowers =

1998 sculpture in Washington, D.C., U.S.

- The sculpture in 2011
- Artist: Stephen Robin
- Year: 1998
- Type: Sculpture
- Medium: Aluminum
- Location: Washington, D.C., United States; 38.89371°N 77.02962°W

Federal Triangle Flowers is an outdoor 1998 sculptural work by Stephen Robin, installed in Woodrow Wilson Plaza, between the William Jefferson Clinton Federal Building and the Ronald Reagan Building and International Trade Center, in Washington, D.C., United States. The installation includes two pieces, one depicting a single stem rose and the other a lily. The cast-aluminum sculptures are set on limestone pedestals; both flowers measure approximately 10 feet (3.0 m) x 14 feet (4.3 m) x 7 feet (2.1 m).

== See also ==
- 1998 in art
- List of public art in Washington, D.C., Ward 6
