= Legacy of Leadership =

1998 sculpture in Berrien Springs, Michigan, U.S.

- Artist: Alan Collins
- Year: 1998
- Type: Sculpture
- Medium: Bronze
- Subject: J. N. Andrews and his children
- Location: Berrien Springs, Michigan, U.S.; 41°57′44.6″N 86°21′33.8″W

Legacy of Leadership is an outdoor 1998 sculpture by Alan Collins, installed on the Andrews University campus in Berrien Springs, Michigan, United States. The bronze sculptural group depicts J. N. Andrews and his children Charles and Mary departing from Boston Harbor in 1874 for missionary work overseas. It was unveiled in front of Pioneer Memorial Church in 1998.

== See also ==
- 1998 in art
- Regeneration (1975), another sculpture by Collins at Andrews University
