= Juan Carlos Viera =

Uruguayan Seventh-day adventist (1938–2016)

Juan Carlos Viera Rossano
- Born: 30 April 1938
- Died: 28 November 2016 (aged 78)
- Occupations: Seventh-day Adventists; Teacher; Preacher

Juan Carlos Viera Rossano (April 30, 1938 – November 28, 2016) was an Uruguayan Seventh-day Adventist director of the Ellen G. White Estate from 1995 to 2000. A native of Uruguay, Viera was the first director of the White Estate to come from outside the North American Division. He holds an M.A. in Religion from Andrews University (1976) and a doctorate in Missiology from Fuller Theological Seminary. In 1998 he wrote the book "The Voice of the Spirit: How God Has Led His People Through the Gift of Prophecy" (Pacific Press, 1998; available online).

Vieira died on 28 November 2016, at the age of 78.

== See also ==
- Seventh-day Adventist Church
- Seventh-day Adventist theology
- Seventh-day Adventist eschatology
- History of the Seventh-day Adventist Church
- Inspiration of Ellen G. White
- Ellen G. White Estate

Preceded by Paul A. Gordon	Secretary of the Ellen G. White Estate; 1995–2000	Succeeded by James R. Nix
