= Greg Constantine =

Canadian-American artist

Greg Constantine is a contemporary Canadian-American artist who currently lives and works in Berrien Springs, Michigan.

Some of his artwork can be seen on his personal webpage: gconstantine.com

== Biography ==
Constantine was born in Windsor, Ontario, Canada in 1938. He received a BA from Andrews University in 1960 and went on to complete a Master of Fine Arts from Michigan State University in 1968.

Constantine became a naturalized US citizen in 1976. He was a professor of drawing, painting, and art history at Andrews University for 43 years, retiring from teaching in 2006.

== Recognitions ==
In 1984, Constantine was awarded the J.N. Andrews Medallion by [Andrews University] for outstanding research and publication. In 1986, he was the recipient of a Michigan Creative Artists Grant. In 1996, Constantine was made Artist-in-Residence and Research Professor of Art.

== Publications ==
Constantine is the author of six books. In 1982, he started a project depicting famous artist visiting various American cities, and illustrating for marvel comics. The series of three books were published by Alfred A. Knopf and Chicago Review Books. They include "Vincent van Gogh Visits New York", published in 1983, "Leonardo Visits Los Angeles", published in 1985, and "Picasso Visits Chicago" in 1986. In 2009, Constantine started a series of children's books that depict famous artists as young children. Using historical facts about the artists he shows a basis for how their later work might have been influenced by their childhood experiences. Published by Edgecliff Press, the series includes "When Big Artists Were Little Kids", "When MORE Big Artists Were Little Kids", and "When Big Architects Were Little Kids".

== Exhibitions ==
Constantine has been exhibiting nationally since 1969 and has a record of 47 solo exhibits.

== One-person exhibitions ==
=== 2010s ===
- 2012: OK Harris Gallery, New York, New York
- 2010: Buchanan Museum of Fine Art, Buchanan, Michigan

=== 2000s ===
- 2008: Lakeside Gallery West, Michigan City, Indiana
- 2007: Benton Harbor Fine Art Gallery, Benton Harbor, Michigan
- 2006: Broadway Windows, New York, NY
- 2004: OK Harris Gallery, New York, NY
- 2004: Lakeside Gallery, Lakeside, Berrien County, Michigan
- 2003: Washington Square Windows, New York, NY
- 2002: National Theatre Bucharest, Bucharest, Romania; South Haven Art Center, South Haven, Michigan; DeGraaf Gallery, Saugatuck, Michigan
- 2001: OK Harris Gallery, New York, NY

=== 1990s ===
- 1999: Lakeside Gallery, Lakeside, MI
- 1998: Bethel college, Mishawaka, Indiana
- 1997: OK Harris Gallery, New York, NY
- 1996: Washington Square East Windows, New York, NY; Broadway Windows, New York, NY
- 1995: Hunter Museum of American Art, Chattanooga, Tennessee; OK Harris Gallery, New York, NY; Jean Albano Gallery, Chicago, Illinois
- 1994: OK Harris Gallery, New York, NY
- 1992: OK Harris Gallery, New York, NY
- 1991: Kalamazoo Institute of Arts, Kalamazoo, Michigan; OK Harris Gallery, Birmingham, Michigan
- 1990: Hokin Gallery, Bay Harbor Islands, Florida; OK Harris Gallery, New York, NY; Broadway Windows, New York, NY

=== 1980s ===
- 1988: Western Michigan University, Kalamazoo, MI; South Bend Museum of Art, South Bend, Indiana
- 1987: OK Harris Gallery, New York, NY; Broadway Windows, New York, NY
- 1986: Hokin-Kaufman Gallery, Chicago, IL
- 1985: Long Beach Museum of Art, Long Beach, California; Tortue Gallery, Santa Monica, California; OK Harris Gallery, New York, NY
- 1984: Hoechst Cultural Center, Frankfurt, Germany
- 1983: Munson-Williams-Proctor Arts Institute, Utica, New York; OK Harris Gallery, New York, NY
- 1981: Frumkin and Struve Gallery, Chicago, IL; The Louis K. Meisel Gallery, New York, NY
- 1980: Pacific Union College, Angwin, California

=== 1970s ===
- 1979: La Sierra College, Riverside, California; Goshen College, Goshen, Indiana
- 1978: Razor Gallery, New York, NY; Galleria Caminul Artei, Bucharest, Romania
- 1977: One Illinois Center, Chicago, IL; Fine Arts Week, Loma Linda University, Loma Linda, California; Razor Gallery, New York, NY 1977; Romanian Cultural Center, New York, NY
- 1975: Western Michigan University, Kalamazoo, MI; South Bend Museum of Art, South Bend, IN
- 1973: Western Michigan University, Kalamazoo, MI; South Bend Museum of Art, South Bend, IN
- 1972: Western Michigan University, Kalamazoo, MI
- 1971: South Bend Museum of Art, South Bend, IN

== List of group exhibitions ==
=== 2010s ===
- 2010: AIEP, Paramaribo, Suriname

=== 2000s ===
- 2009: Michigan Masters, Kresge Art Museum, Michigan State University, East Lansing, MI; Art in Embassies Program, (AIEP) NATO, Brussels, Belgium
- 2008: Elkhart Juried Regional, Midwest Museum of American Art, Elkhart, Indiana
- 2005: Elkhart Juried Regional, Midwest Museum of American Art, Elkhart, IN
- 2004: 76th Regional Competition, Muskegon, Michigan; West Michigan Area Show, Kalamazoo, MI; Michigan Fine Arts Competition, Birmingham, MI; Everything OK at OK Harris, Brevard Museum, Melbourne, Florida
- 2003: Car Crazy, Hinsdale Center for the Arts, Hinsdale, Illinois; Subject/Object, OK harris Works of Art, New York, NY
- 2002: Art in Embassies Program, (AIEP) Athens, Greece
- 2001: AIEP, Vilnius, Lithuania; AIEP, Minsk, Belarus; Reflections, Jean Albano Gallery, Chicago, IL
- 2000: Chicago Collectors Select, Jean Albano Gallery, Chicago, IL; Pop and After, 65-00, Beth Urdang Gallery, Boston, Massachusetts

=== 1990s ===
- 1999: Harper Collins Exhibit Space, New York, NY
- 1998: AIEP, Chișinău, Moldova; AIEP, Brussels, Belgium; AIEP, The Hague, Netherlands; Primary Colors, Jean Albano Gallery, Chicago, IL; Surrealist Show, Monique Goldstrom Gallery, New York, NY
- 1997: Two of a Kind, Jean Albano Gallery, Chicago, IL
- 1996: Group Show, Barbara Scott Gallery, Miami Beach, Florida; New York Works, Arij Gasiunasen Fine Arts, Palm Beach, Florida; Best of 1995, Jean Albano Gallery, Chicago, IL
- 1995: Humor & Politics, Westbeth Gallery, New York, NY
- 1994: Art After Art, Nassau County Museum of Art, Roslyn Harbor, New York
- 1993: The Purloined Image, Flint Institute of Art, Flint, Michigan
- 1992: Frame Up!, University of Rhode Island, Kingston, Rhode Island; New Work-New York, Helander Gallery, Palm Beach, FL
- 1991: Tenth Anniversary Exhibition, Helander Gallery, Palm Beach, FL; O.K. Harris Works of Art, Birmhingham, MI
- 1990: Morgan Gallery, Kansas City, Missouri; Regarding Art: Artworks About Art, Kohler Arts Center, Sheboygan, Wisconsin; On Paper, Hokin-Kaufman Gallery, Chicago, IL

=== 1980s ===
- 1988: Homages to Hopper, Baruch College, New York, NY
- 1987: Signs, Times, Writings, Detroit Institute of Arts, Detroit, Michigan; Hokin-Kaufman Gallery, Chicago, IL; Collaborations, South Bend Art Center, South Bend, IN
- 1986: Statue of Liberty Centennial, Ellis Island, New York; La Grande Jatte Centennial, Roy Boyd Gallery, Chicago, IL
- 1985: Alterations, South Bend Art Center, South Bend, IN
- 1983: Contemporary Works on Paper, Frumkin and Struve Gallery, Chicago, IL; University Museum, Southern Illinois University, Carbondale, Illinois; Portland Art Museum, Portland, OR; Prints and Multiples, Quincy Society of Fine Arts, Quincy, Illinois
- 1982: Minot State College 11th National Prints and Drawings, Minot, North Dakota; Regional Competition, Owensboro, Kentucky; Prints and Multiples, National Museum of American Art, Washington, D.C.; Prints and Multiples, National Academy of Design, New York, NY; Prints and Multiples, Illinois State Museum, Springfield, IL
- 1981: Prints and Multiples, Lakeview Museum, Peoria, Illinois; Chicago and Vicinity Competition, Art Institute, Chicago, IL
- 1980: Michigan Artists Competition, Grand Rapids Art Museum, Grand Rapids, Michigan

=== 1970s ===
- 1978: Artists Look at Art, University of Kansas, Lawrence, Kansas
- 1977: Kalamazoo Area Show, Kalamazoo Institute of Art, Kalamazoo, MI
- 1976: Michigan State University Alumni Artists, East Lansing, MI; Michigan Artists-Teachers, University of Michigan, Ann Arbor, Michigan
- 1975: Contemporary Painters, Philbrook Art Center, Tulsa, Oklahoma; Randolph-Macon Women's College Invitational, Lynchburg, Virginia; Delmar College Drawing Exhibition, Corpus Christi, Texas; LaGrange National Exhibition, LaGrange, Georgia; Contemporary American Art Exhibition, Lehigh University, Bethlehem, Pennsylvania; James Yu Gallery, New York, NY
- 1974: James Yu Gallery, New York, NY
- 1971: *Michigan Artists, Detroit Institute of Arts, Detroit, MI; Chicago and Vicinity Competition, Art Institute of Chicago, Chicago, IL

=== 1960s ===
- 1969: Michigan Artists, Detroit Institute of Arts, Detroit, MI; Michigan Painters, Grand Rapids Art Museum, Grand Rapids, MI; Arkansas National Exhibition, University of Arkansas, AR
