= Alan Collins (sculptor) =

English-born American sculptor (1928–2016)

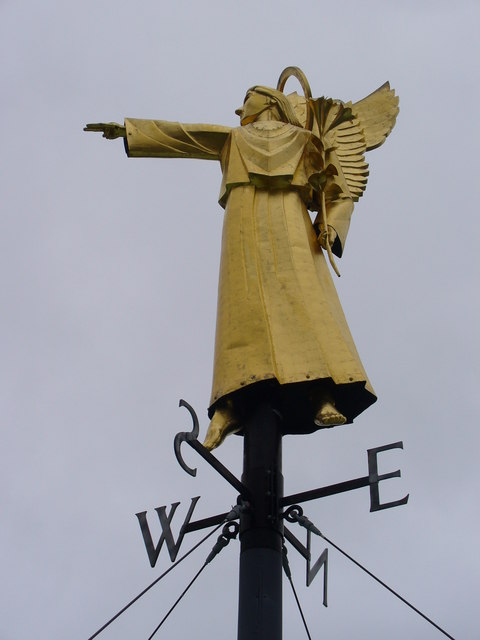
- Gilded Angel, Guildford Cathedral weather vane
- Born: 15 August 1928; Beddington, Surrey, England
- Died: 18 October 2016 (aged 88)
- Education: Wimbledon School of Art, Royal College of Art
- Spouse(s): Jeanne Fuegi; Aliki Snow
- Awards: Sir Otto Beit Medal
- Elected: Fellow of Royal Academy
- Website: collinsculptor.com

Alan Collins (15 August 1928 – 18 October 2016) was an English-born sculptor noted for his work at Guildford Cathedral. After continuing his career in England, Collins moved to the United States and continued working there as an artist and, for more than 20 years, as a professor of art at Seventh-day Adventist universities.

Collins work primarily focused on evocative Biblical stories told in outdoor sculptures, which has been described as "24-hour, 365-days-a-year silent sermons."

== Early life ==
Collins was born in the village of Beddington, in northeast Surrey, England. At the age of 16, after attending public schools, Collins entered Wimbledon School of Art. While there he earned first prize in an England-wide competition. Having won a scholarship for the Royal College of Art, he studied sculpture.

Collins developed a lifelong connection to the Adventist Church after having attended a meeting by Australian evangelist Thomas J. Bradley in Corydon, England. At a Seventh-day Adventist Church in Holloway, London, Collins met his wife Jeanne Fuegi, and they were married in 1954.

== Career ==
When Collins first began carving in stone he used limestone from Malta, which was in great supply during and after World War II as it had been used by supply ships as ballast when returning to England without cargo.

His sculptures were exhibited at the Royal Society for the Arts and the Royal Academy, one of which was Head of a King, in Maltese stone, exhibited in 1946 at Exhibition 20 by the Arts and Crafts Exhibition Society when he was a student at Wimbledon College of Art.

In 1964 Collins was elected a Fellow of the Royal Society of British Sculptors and received the Society's Sir Otto Beit Medal for his stone carving of St. Martha of Bethany at Guildford Cathedral.

In 1968 he moved to the United States and began a career of over 20 years, teaching at Seventh-day Adventists universities, including Atlantic Union College (1968–1971) in Massachusetts, Andrews University (1971–1978) in Michigan, and Loma Linda University (La Sierra Campus) (1978–1989) in California. As a result of his years of work teaching at Adventist universities, he developed a "signature style" that is attributed to Adventist college works.

After retiring from teaching, Collins worked in Phoenix, Oregon on his own works made in many mediums: bronze, wood, clay, wood, concrete and stone. He created many works for the Adventist Church, and also conducted lectures and showed his work at Adventist colleges.

He moved back to England in 2013, and lived in Bridport, Dorset until his death.

== Works ==
Aside from Collins's work at Guildford Cathedral, he executed other works in England before moving to the United States. Most notably, he designed and carved the John F. Kennedy Memorial at Runnymede. In the United States he created sculptures largely for religious organisations, commissions from hospitals and private individuals. He never used models for his sculptures, they were all created using his own imagination. He was noted for being very knowledgeable of human anatomy and he always taught human anatomy to his sculpture students. This information came from his second wife Aliki Collins.

=== Guildford Cathedral ===
Collins's most extensive work was created for the exterior of Guildford Cathedral, including:

- The Hand of God, visible at the approach to the cathedral. Surrounded by the moon, stars and the sun, the offered hand represents an "invitation from God to be a part of the Christian Community".
- a statue of Archangel Gabriel, at the eastern end of the Lady Chapel.
- statues of St Catherine and St Martha on the buttresses of the Lady Chapel.
- atop the cathedral's tower, Gilded Angel, made of copper and gilded with gold leaf; although the 4.5-metre (15 foot) tall sculpture, constructed by Hurst, Franklin & Co of Islington, weighs about one ton, it is mounted on ball bearings allowing it to turn with shifting wind directions. Collins created the scale model of the angel in gold on the top of the tower and the font.
- nine statues of Christian virtues and Gifts of the Spirit: Charity, Courage, Temperance, Prudence, Wisdom, Understanding, Counsel, Fortitude and Knowledge.
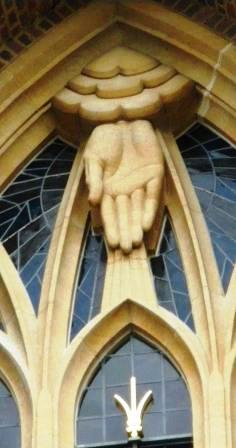
The Hand of God

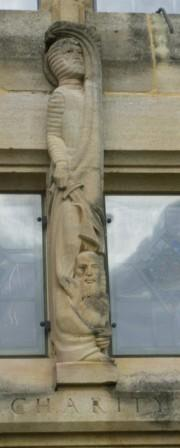
Charity

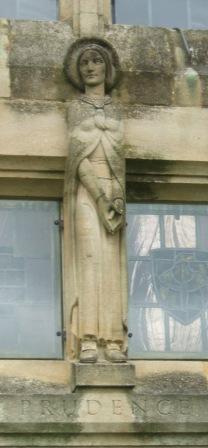
Prudence

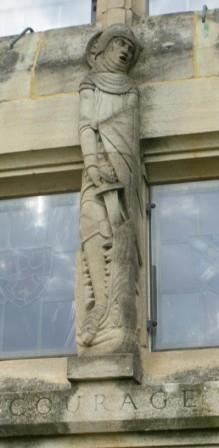
Courage

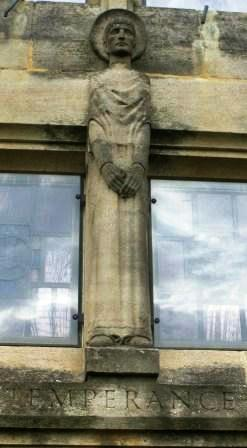
Temperance

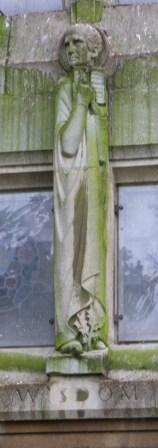
Wisdom

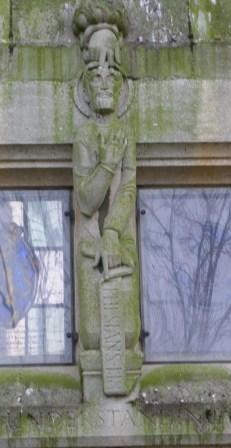
Understanding

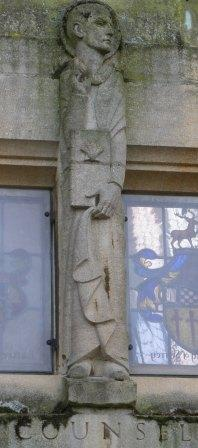
Counsel

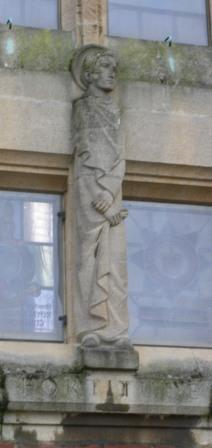
Fortitude

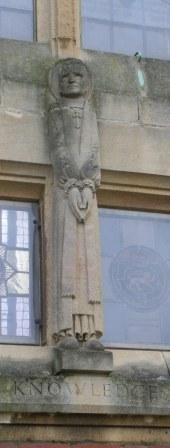
Knowledge

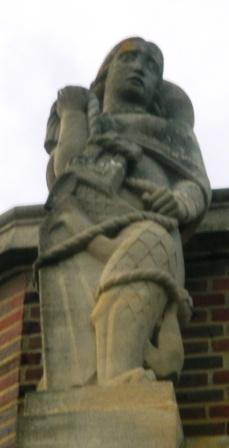
St Martha

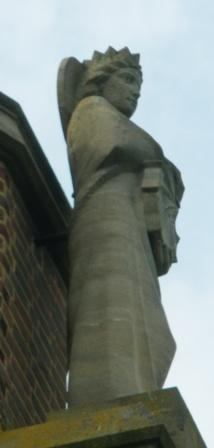
St Catherine

=== Seventh-day Adventist Campuses ===
- Andrews University – Collins created two works on the campus. His 1975 sculpture, Regeneration, a looping, concrete ribbon resembling the DNA molecule, is located on the patio of the Science Complex. In 1998, he completed the sculpture, Legacy of Leadership, depicting the family of John Nevins Andrews, the first Adventist foreign missionary, for whom the University is named.
- Loma Linda University – Collins's 7'3" limestone sculpture, Good Samaritan, on the campus mall was unveiled in 1981 . After being vandalized in 1983 and its restoration deteriorating from smog, the sculpture was recast in bronze and rededicated in 1995. The work adapts the familiar parable from Luke 10: 29-37 in a contemporary interpretation and conveys the University's motto, "to make man whole." A sandblast glass relief based on the original sculpture has also resided in the Center for Dentistry and Orthodontics since 2012. Collins also created the life-size, campus sculpture Who Touched Me? in 2010, depicting the Gospel story of a woman healed by touching Jesus's clothes.
- La Sierra University – In 2002, Collins created the campus sculpture entitled The Glory of God's Grace, depicting Jesus's parable of "The Man with Two Sons," commonly called "The Parable of the Prodigal Son," from Luke 15:11-32. Considering it one of his best pieces, Collins said that it was: “The chance to show the nature of God through a piece.”
- Oakwood University – In 2005, Collins completed the sculpture Sacrificial Service, which depicts Simon of Cyrene carrying Jesus's cross to the site of the crucifixion, for Oakwood University in Huntsville, Alabama.
- Walla Walla University – Collins was commissioned by the class of 1950 to create a bronze commemorating their 50th anniversary in 2010. His work, Jesus Among Us, is a bronze statue depicting Jesus washing his disciples' feet (John 13:1-20) that encapsulates "Generosity in Service" from the University's mission statement: "Walla Walla University is a community of faith dedicated to excellence in thought, generosity in service, beauty in expression and faith in God.".
- Burman University (formerly Canadian University College) – Unveiled on 7 June 2013 during Alumni Weekend, Collin's last work, The Sower, a representation of Jesus's "Parable of the Sower," is the centrepiece of the Administration Building lobby at the Alberta university.

=== Contemporary religious art ===
- The First Advent depicts It Came Upon a Midnight Clear at the South Lancaster, Massachusetts Atlantic Union College.
- Three Angels of the Apocalypse in St Albans, England, the "first public sculpture commissioned by the Adventist Church".
- Three Angels of the Apocalypse, a different version of the same theme as the St. Albans work, is located in Lincoln, Nebraska on the Union College administrative building.
- The Flame, "that Fire which leads", is located within the sermon hall of the Bay Knoll Adventist Church in Rochester, New York. Of this work, Collins wrote:

Fire is perhaps the most memorable visual form by which God has made His presence known to men. The burning bush, the guiding pillar of fire, the all-consuming fire on Mount Carmel, the tongues of fire at Pentecost and the eventual purification of the world by fire are pictures that come quite readily to mind. Being symbolic, my representation of fire became formalized, differing from the fluctuating form of fire itself. An artist may frequently attempt to make a visual analogy between differing visual forms, creating a bridge that will unite seemingly disparate qualities to form a new reality. In bringing together the two-halves of my design I trapped a space that outlines the form of a wheat ear, the wheat that God will harvest when the chaff has all been burned. At the center of the design is a calm, stable form in clear plexiglass which I think of as the quiet flame of God's presence – the still small voice at the heart of every fiery experience.

=== Other works ===
The following is a partial list of Collins's other works.

==== England ====
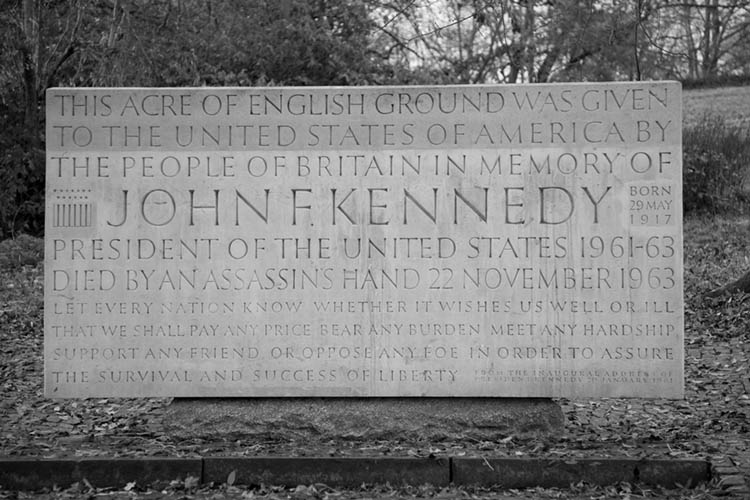
Inscription on Runnymede Memorial for Kennedy Memorial Trust

- Head of a King that Collins exhibited in 1946 at Exhibition 20 by the Arts and Crafts Exhibition Society when he was a student at Wimbledon College of Art.
- Inscription on Runnymede Memorial for Kennedy Memorial Trust
- Minerva is an abstract sculpture made of aluminium. It is situated on a concrete plinth between Minerva House and Southwark Cathedral in London.
- Chessboard, picking up the theme of Hodder & Stoughton Publishers "chess knight" logo, was made from Portland Stone by Collins in 1963 for the publishers offices at St Paul's House, Warwick Lane, London, England. Collins was commissioned the work through Victor Heal and Partners.
- At the St. Clement Dane Church, the City of London is a memorial to an 18th-century couple, Francis and Catherine Sirr. Replacing the original destroyed during World War II, it is located in the crypt and made of Portland stone.
- Seven portrait masks on keystones above the nave arcades in St. Mary-Le-Bow church, the City of London.
- Stone figure of the patron saint of sailors above the entrance to St. Nicholas' Church in Saltdean, Sussex.
- Replacement of the Royal Coat-of-Arms of King Charles above the portico of All Saints' Church in Northampton.
- Sculptures at Bradford Cathedral, Yorkshire.
- A work above the Grays Inn Law School doorway in London that depicts a lion, griffon and eagle in limestone.

==== United States ====
- At a library Jacksonville County, Oregon, Collins inscribed the building with Roman-style lettering.

== Awards and exhibitions ==
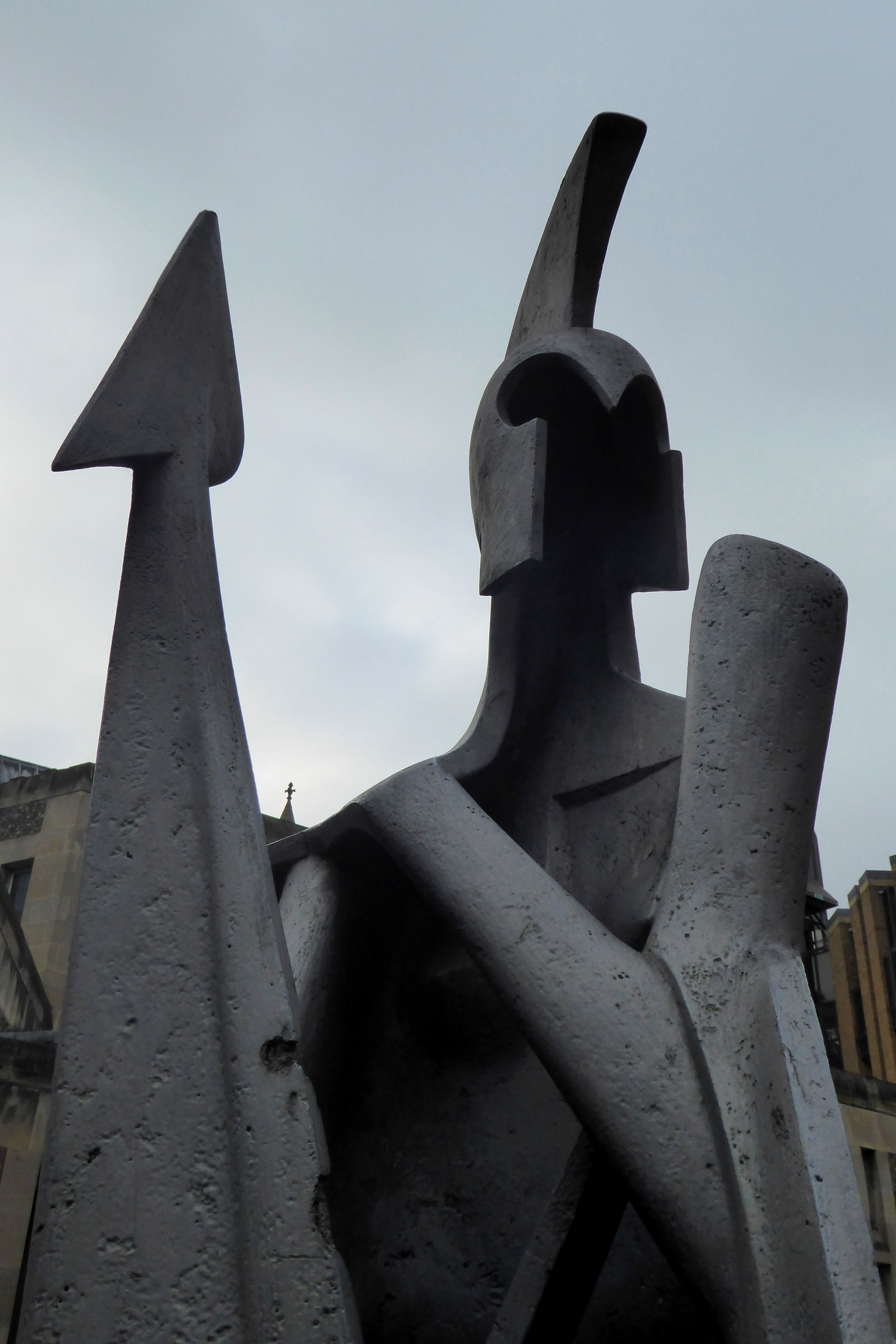
Sculpture of a soldier outside Southwark Cathedral.

- For his Guildford Cathedral stone sculpture work, Collins was awarded first prize for a Commonwealth wide sculpture contest and received the Royal British Society of Sculptors Sir Otto Beit Medal.
- Collins was awarded in 1988 the first honorary degree bestowed by the Adventist Church for recognition of his work.
- In the early 2000s he was awarded a second honorary doctorate degree by Loma Linda University, California.
- In 2004 Collins exhibited in Florence, Italy at International Biennale of Contemporary Art.

== Personal life ==
After beginning his career in England, Collins, moved to the United States in 1968 with his wife Jeanne and their daughter and son. They first lived in South Lancaster, Massachusetts. They moved to Michigan in 1971, where Collins taught at Andrews University (a Seventh-day Adventist university in Berrien Springs.) In 1978 Collins and his family moved to California where Collins taught for 11 years at La Sierra University (another Seventh-day Adventist university that was located in Riverside.)

Collins's wife Jeanne Fuegi suffered a long battle with cancer and died in 1992. In 1993, Collins married his second wife Aliki After his retirement from sculpting, he moved to Bridport, Dorset, England.
