= Andrews University Press =

American university press

Andrews University Press (AUP) is an academic publishing authority operated under the auspices of Andrews University in Berrien Springs, Michigan. Established with minimal funding in 1969, a permanent director was appointed in 1979. AUP now has over 90 titles in print, and the Press publishes and distributes books, journals, papers and films that make a scholarly and/or professional contribution to their respective fields and are in harmony with the mission of Andrews University. Publication emphases include such areas as biblical archaeology, biblical studies, religion, education, faith and learning, and selected areas of science. The Press also occasionally publishes non-academic materials under other imprints. The Press is immediately governed by the Andrews University Scholarly Publications and University Press Board, which considers and authorizes all publications of the Press. The current director of the press is Ronald Knott.

== See also ==
- List of English-language book publishing companies
- List of university presses
- Seventh-day Adventist Church
- Andrews University
