= Regeneration (sculpture) =

Outdoor concrete sculpture designed by Alan Collins

- Artist: Alan Collins
- Year: 1975; 51 years ago
- Type: Sculpture
- Medium: Concrete
- Location: Berrien Springs, Michigan, U.S.; 41°57′46″N 86°21′20″W

Regeneration is an outdoor 1975 concrete sculpture designed by Alan Collins, located on the Andrews University campus in Berrien Springs, Michigan, United States.

== Description and history ==
Regeneration was designed by Alan Collins in 1971, specifically for the patio of Andrews University's Science Complex. Andrews offers the following description: "The looping, curving ribbon resembles the joining and division of molecules, the intricately twisted DNA molecule, or the form of a mandorla, a medieval symbol of Jesus Christ. At no point does the ribbon ever touch itself in its course, suggesting the course of life. The four forms extending out to passersby represent the four primitive elements—earth, air, water and fire—in subject (horizontal) forms at Jesus' Second coming." The sculpture's unveiling was intended to coincide with the Science Complex's dedication, but was delayed until the fall of 1975. Nearly 2 miles (3.2 km) of steel rebar, installed by two faculty members and a student work during the summer of 1975, reinforces the 22-foot (6.7 m), 6-tonne (6,000 kg) concrete piece.

== See also ==
- 1975 in art
- Legacy of Leadership (1998), another sculpture by Collins at Andrews University
