= Paul A. Gordon =

Seventh-day Adventist director of the Ellen G. White Estate

- Born: 1930
- Died: June 25, 2009 (aged 78–79); Medford, Oregon
- Occupations: Seventh-day Adventist teacher, preacher, and director of the Ellen G. White Estate

Paul Alfred Gordon (1930 – June 25, 2009) was a Seventh-day Adventist. He was director of the Ellen G. White Estate from 1990 to 1995.

== Background ==
Paul Gordon was born in 1930. A graduate of Auburn Academy in Washington and of what is now Walla Walla University in College Place, Washington, Gordon began his work for the Seventh-day Adventist Church with pastoral ministry in Oregon and Washington state, as well as service as a Bible teacher at both Upper Columbia Academy and Milo Adventist Academy.

He served in the White Estate for over 30 years, serving for 5 years as director of the organization which safeguards and promotes the writings and ministry of Ellen G. White, a pioneering founder of the movement. He traveled to more than 100 countries in his work with the White Estate, retiring in 1995.

In 1981, Gordon was a co-founder of the Adventist Heritage Ministry, and led out in the acquisition of the William Miller home in 1984. He was the primary compiler for four morning devotional books; and authored numerous articles for church periodicals including Adventist Review. His two-part 1980 Review article, “The Right to Vote – Shall I Exercise It?” were subjects which are still cited as important articles.

Gordon died in 2009 at the age of 79, and was survived by his wife Donna, their four children, and a number of grandchildren.

== See also ==
- Seventh-day Adventist Church
- Seventh-day Adventist theology
- Seventh-day Adventist eschatology
- History of the Seventh-day Adventist Church
- Teachings of Ellen G. White
- Inspiration of Ellen G. White
- Prophecy in the Seventh-day Adventist Church
- Investigative judgment
- The Pillars of Adventism
- Second Coming
- Conditional Immortality
- Historicism
- Three Angels' Messages
- Sabbath in seventh-day churches
- Ellen G. White
- Adventism
- Seventh-day Adventist Church Pioneers
- Seventh-day Adventist worship
- Ellen G. White Estate

Preceded by Robert W. Olson	Secretary of the Ellen G. White Estate; 1990–1995	Succeeded by Juan Carlos Viera
