= Floribunda (sculpture) =

Sculpture in Portland, Oregon, U.S.

- The sculpture in 2015
- Artist: Mark Calderon
- Year: 1998
- Type: Sculpture
- Medium: Bronze
- Location: Portland, Oregon, United States; 45.52067°N 122.67668°W
- Owner: City of Portland and Multnomah County Public Art Collection courtesy of the Regional Arts & Culture Council

Floribunda is an outdoor 1998 bronze sculpture by American artist Mark Calderon, installed in Portland, Oregon, United States. It is part of the City of Portland and Multnomah County Public Art Collection courtesy of the Regional Arts & Culture Council, which administers the work.

== Description ==
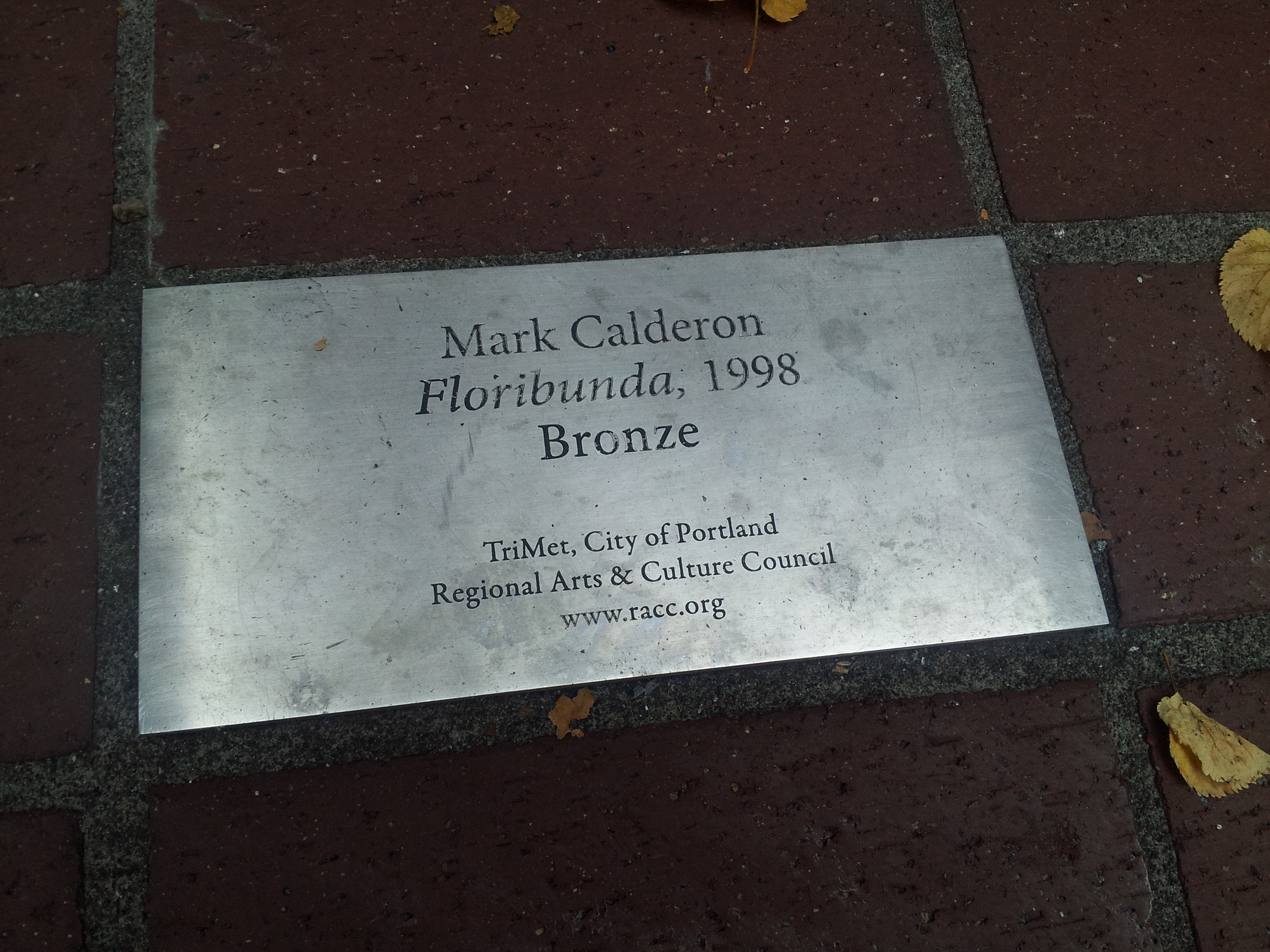
Plaque for the sculpture

Mark Calderon's Floribunda (1998) is a bronze sculpture installed at the southwest corner of the intersection of Southwest 5th Avenue and Stark Street in the Portland Transit Mall. The sculpture, part of a series of works created by Calderon in the 1990s based on hairstyles found in 12th- and 13th-century Japanese Buddhist sculpture, measures 23 inches (58 cm) x 23.5 inches (60 cm) x 23.5 inches (60 cm). Floribunda is the only free-standing piece from the series, but according to the Regional Arts & Culture Council, which administers the work, "much of his work from that period was inspired by religious images of ancient cultures and consisted of larger than life-size pieces—head-like in form—meant to be displayed on a wall". The sculpture is part of the City of Portland and Multnomah County Public Art Collection courtesy of the Regional Arts & Culture Council.

== See also ==
- 1998 in art
- Japanese sculpture
