= Adventist Heritage Ministry =

Adventist Heritage Ministry

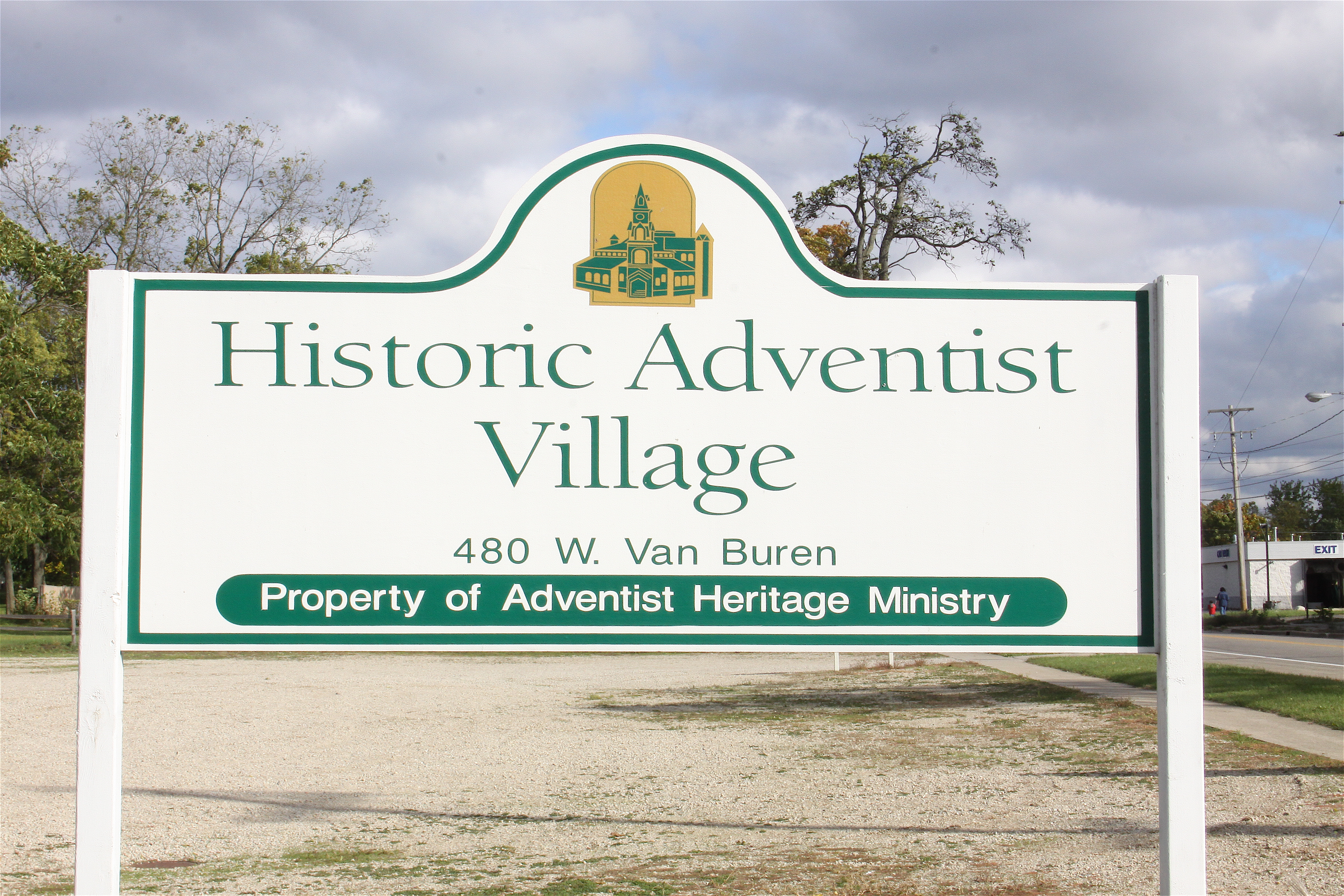
Historic Adventist Village-Entrance

Adventist Heritage Ministries (AHM) began on May 8, 1981, as Adventist Historic Properties, Inc., by several Adventist laypeople to help preserve Seventh-day Adventist historic sites. Shortly after its founding the organization adopted the motto, "The Past With a Future."

== History ==
The organization did not come under church ownership until 1988.

In 1984 AHM purchased 25 acres (100,000 m^{2}) that was originally part of William Miller's farm in Low Hampton, New York. Included in this purchase was William Miller's house built in 1815 and nearby Ascension Rock, where local Millerites are reported to have waited for Christ's return on October 22, 1844. In 1985 the organization published the first issue of its periodical, the AHP Bulletin, containing updates and mailed to the organizations supporters.

In 1989 AHM purchased 17 acres (69,000 m^{2}) near Port Gibson, New York. Three years later the organization purchased a barn that originally belonged to Luther Edson, Hiram Edson's father, dismantled it, and transported it to the Edson farm to be re-erected there.

In 1994 the organization's name was formally changed to "Adventist Heritage Ministry" and initial plans were laid for the development of a Historic Adventist Village consisting of nearly a three block area that included the home of James and Ellen White, the home of Deacon John and Betsey White, the Loughborough property, and the surrounding area.

In 2005 the organization purchased the home of Joseph Bates in Fairhaven, Massachusetts.

The organization is governed by a board of trustees elected by their constituent organization, the Ellen G. White Estate board of trustees.

Board Chairs: Lawrence E. Crandall, 1981-1988; Robert L. Dale, 1988-1997; James R. Nix, 1997-present.

Presidents: Lawrence E. Crandall, 1981-1991; James R. Nix, 1991-1995; Alice R. Voorheis, 1995-2001; Thomas R. Neslund, 2001-2016; Markus Kutzschbach, 2016 - Present

== See also ==
- History of the Seventh-day Adventist Church
- Seventh-day Adventist Church
