= Castro Organ Devotees Association =

American nonprofit organization

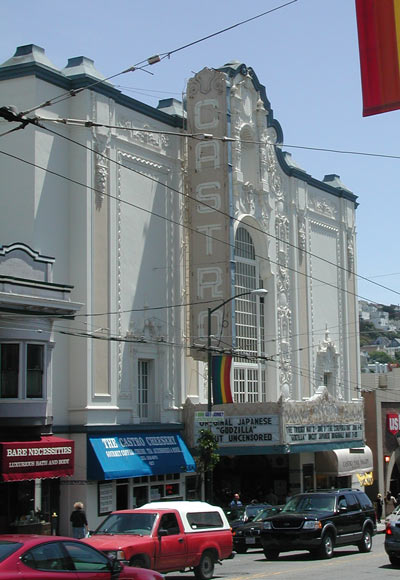
The Castro Theatre in San Francisco, anchors The Castro business district and is home to the Mighty Wurlitzer Hope-Jones Unit Orchestra pipe organ.

The Castro Organ Devotees Association (CODA) is an American nonprofit organization dedicated to preserving and enhancing the tradition of live organ music in San Francisco's Castro Theatre. The theater is a popular San Francisco movie palace, built in the 1920s, which gained Historic Landmark status in 1976. The original Robert Morton organ was removed in the 1950s. The present organ, widely regarded as one of the finest theatre organs assembled, was assembled in the late 1970s using components from other organs, including its console, which was originally built in 1925 for the State Theatre in Detroit, Michigan to accompany silent pictures. The current console and organ were built by the Taylor family starting in 1979, and it has been owned and maintained by them since, but in 2014 they moved taking the console and one fourth of the pipework.

David Hegarty, the Castro Theatre's resident organist, formed CODA to act as a rescue organization for the remaining parts, and formed a partnership with organ designer Alan Harrah who had previously built one of the largest electronic organs in the world. Together they are constructing one of the largest electronic organs in the western United States with seven keyboards, retaining 800 organ pipes.

CODA is set up as an educational and outreach foundation to get the organ bought, and built including installing the expanded console, replacing and increasing the pipes, and coordinating the ongoing fundraising and outreach to build awareness of theater organs. Hegarty noted the Bay Area already has "more world-class theater organs than any area in the country." Once the installation is complete CODA hopes to; have students intern and practice playing the large instrument, set up tours and special events, and act as an attraction for people who seek out the music of the large pipe organs including concert organists. The initial fundraising efforts have been budgeted at $1 million US dollars.

== History of the Castro Theatre ==
The Castro Theatre is located on Castro Street near the intersection of Market and 17th Streets, across from the Castro Street Station on the Muni Metro subway. Located at 429 Castro Street, in the Castro district, it was built in 1922 with a Spanish Colonial Baroque façade that pays homage—in its great arched central window surmounted by a scrolling pediment framing a niche—to the recently rebuilt basilica of Mission Dolores nearby. Its designer, Timothy L. Pflueger, also designed Oakland's Paramount Theater and other movie theaters in California in that period. The theater has 1407 seats. It is one of the few 1920s theater houses still in operation in the U.S.

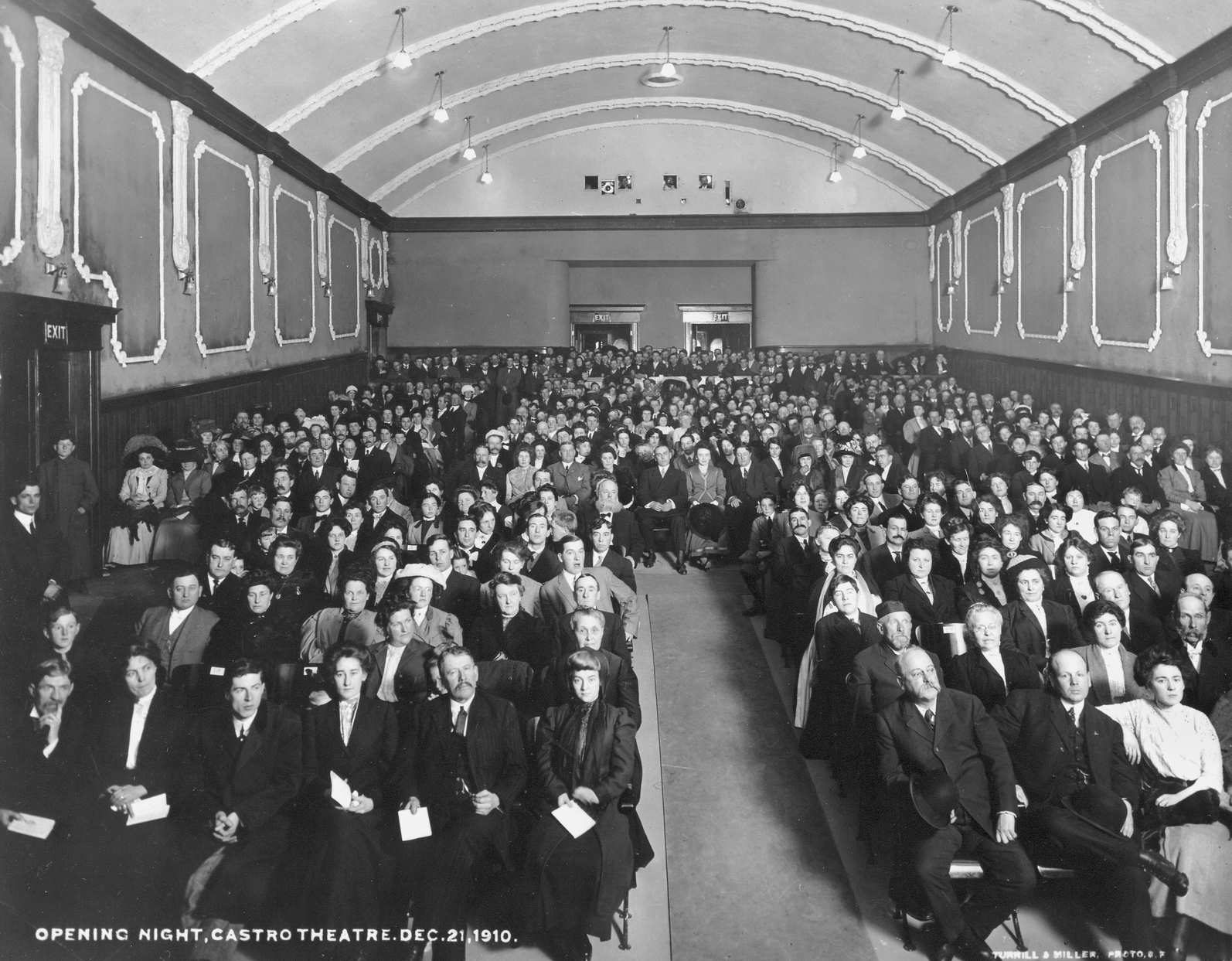
The original Castro Theatre was located down the street from the present location at 479 Castro Street

The Castro Theatre originally opened at 479 Castro Street in 1910. The building was remodeled into a retail store – currently occupied by Cliff's Variety Store, since 1971 – in the mid-1920s after the larger Castro Theatre was built up the street at 429 Castro Street. The new theater opened in June 1922. The interior is luxurious and ornate, with subtly convex and concave walls and ceiling and the dramatic Mighty Wurlitzer Hope-Jones Unit Orchestra pipe organ that is played before films and events. It is San Francisco's last single-screen movie palace.

Today, the Castro Theatre hosts repertory movies, film festivals, and special events, including gay and multicultural focus. In recent years, the Castro has been the site for gala tributes to many legendary Hollywood stars making appearances with a showing of one of their movies, including Tony Curtis, Ann-Margret, Debbie Reynolds, Jane Russell, and Sandra Dee—many of the events produced by local impresario Marc Huestis. The theater can project modern digital formats such as DCP with 5.1 Dolby sound and can accurately reproduce the classic silent film experience by projecting custom frame rates anywhere between 12 and 30 frames per second, including the ability to speed up or slow down during a film. The Castro is capable of showing 70 mm films and is one of the few theaters in the world that can show a 70 mm film with separate DTS soundtrack.

== Organ history ==
The Castro Theatre opened at its present location in 1922. The original Robert Morton organ installed in the early 1920s was removed in the 1950s. In the 1970s a C.G. Conn 651 organ was used until the late 1970s when the Taylor family worked to install a Mighty Wurlitzer. Ray Taylor and his sons began "assembling the all-Wurlitzer pipe organ in 1979", getting parts from many sources, like the console from a Detroit theater. The present organ is a collection of parts pulled together in the late 1970s, as was regarded as one of the finest theatre organs assembled. The organ still belongs to the Taylors, who have maintained and updated the instrument over the past thirty years. The ownership of the organ has remained separate from the ownership of the theater where it resides.

The assembled Mighty Wurlitzer Hope-Jones Unit Orchestra console and organ were leased to the Castro Theatre in 1978, the deal taking four years to culminate in an agreement. When the last theater lease expired July 2001, the Nasser family took over management of the theater. Now the Taylors, who maintained the organ for nearly forty years, are moving and taking the console and a fourth of the pipework sometime in 2014. The organ was due for major reconstruction.

David Hegarty, who has been the main organist at the Castro Theatre, and also plays at a few other Bay Area theaters, has been playing at the Castro Theatre almost nightly since 1983. He contacted Alan Harrah, an electronic organ designer, former president of Rodgers, and close friend who had built one of the largest electronic organs in the world. The two conceived a plan to create the largest combination pipe/electronic organ in the world with seven keyboards and 800 stop controls. Digital organs have developed greatly over the last two decades, and are a cheaper alternative to the pipe organ, particularly in churches. Digital organs by custom builders have become a viable alternative for venues who may have had a pipe organ and can no longer afford to maintain it, or for those situations where a pipe organ is not financially possible. All-digital and pipe/digital combination organs now significantly outsell pipe organs.

Hegarty formed a non-profit group CODA, and they secured a grant to buy the remaining parts of the present organ set-up minus the console and a fourth of the pipes. The current owners of the Castro Theatre are very supportive of the effort as the refurbishment fits in with their plans to offer more special and performing arts events instead of relying on movie sales. CODA is using outreach techniques including concerts, facility tours, lectures, and organ conventions and events.

== Organ console ==
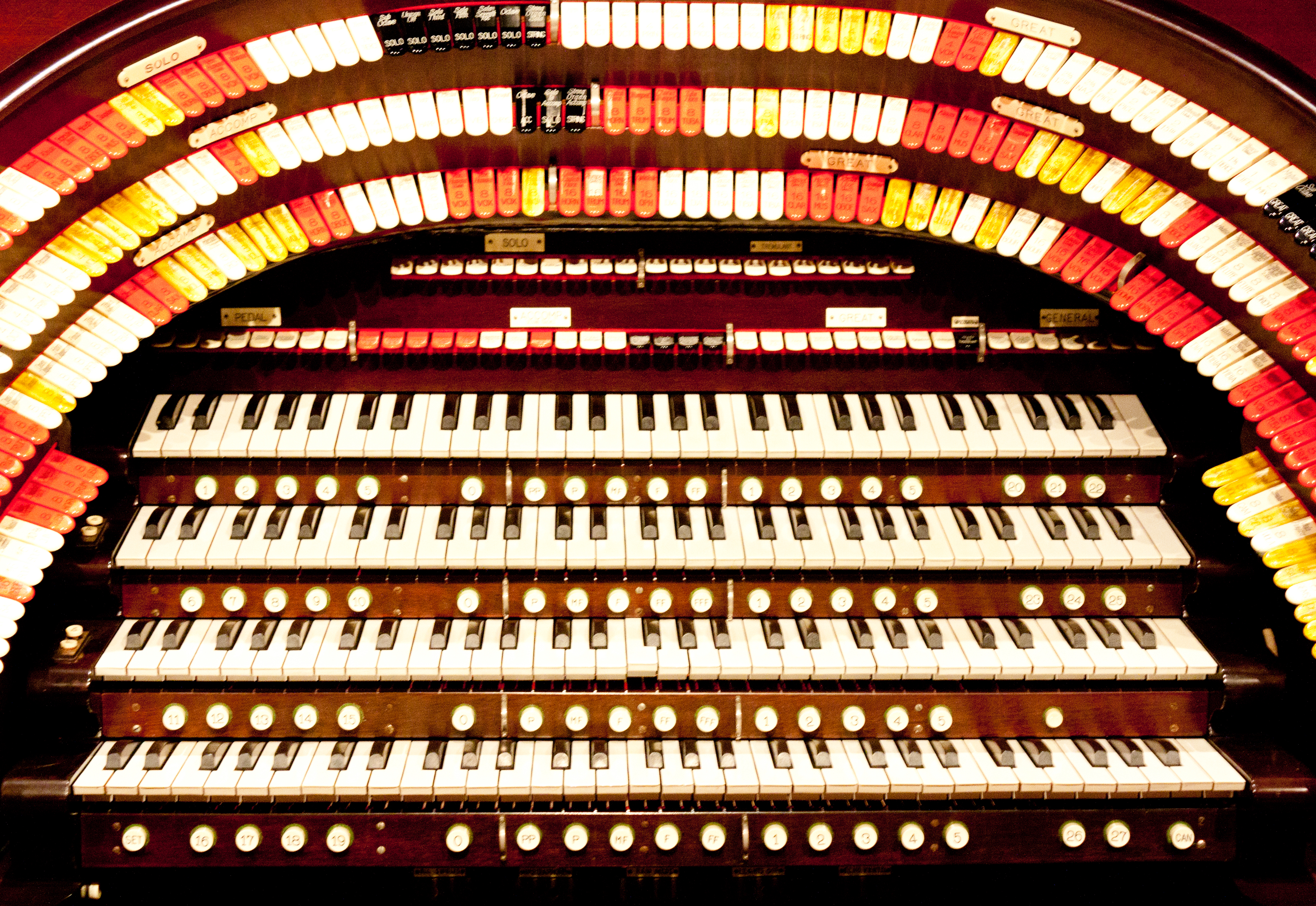
The Mighty Wurlitzer Hope-Jones Unit Orchestra console, from the Nethercutt Collection, showing four manuals and colour-coded stop tabs. The configuration of the Castro Theatre's current hybrid organ is similar. The new console will have seven manuals which is designed so that every key can be reached while performing. The Castro Theatre's pipe ranks are split on either side of the stage and hidden by large organ grills.

A pipe organ is played from an area called the console or keydesk, which holds the manual keyboards that look like a traditional piano keyboard, pedals, and stop controls. This is where the organist resides whether the listener can see the person or not. At the Castro Theatre the console is presently in the front center of the stage facing the screen. The entire console is on a platform that is raised up before an event, stage show, or movie starts. It is usually lowered right before the stage show unfolds and commonly in conjunction with the chorus of "Theme from San Francisco" with the audience clapping along. The Castro Theatre owners have stated they want the refurbished and expanded organ to remain the centerpiece of the theater.

Controls at the console called stops select which ranks and pipes are used. These controls are generally either draw knobs (or stop knobs), which engage the stops when pulled out from the console. Different combinations of stops change the timbre of the instrument considerably. The selection of stops is called the registration. On modern organs, the registration can be changed instantaneously with the aid of a combination action, usually featuring pistons. Pistons are buttons that can be pressed by the organist to change registrations; they are generally found between the manuals or above the pedalboard. In the latter case they are called toe studs or toe pistons (as opposed to thumb pistons). Most large organs have both preset and programmable pistons, with some of the couplers repeated for convenience as pistons and toe studs. Programmable pistons allow comprehensive control over changes in registration. Newer organs may have multiple levels of solid-state memory, allowing each piston to be programmed more than once. This allows more than one organist to store their own registrations. Many newer consoles also feature MIDI, which allows the organist to record performances. It also allows an external keyboard to be plugged in, which assists in tuning and maintenance. The new configured pipe/digital organ will allow for a fuller range of possibilities and broaden the appeal of the Castro Theatre as a "major organ center."
