= Andrews University =

Christian university in Berrien Springs, Michigan, US

Coordinates: 41.963°N 86.358°W

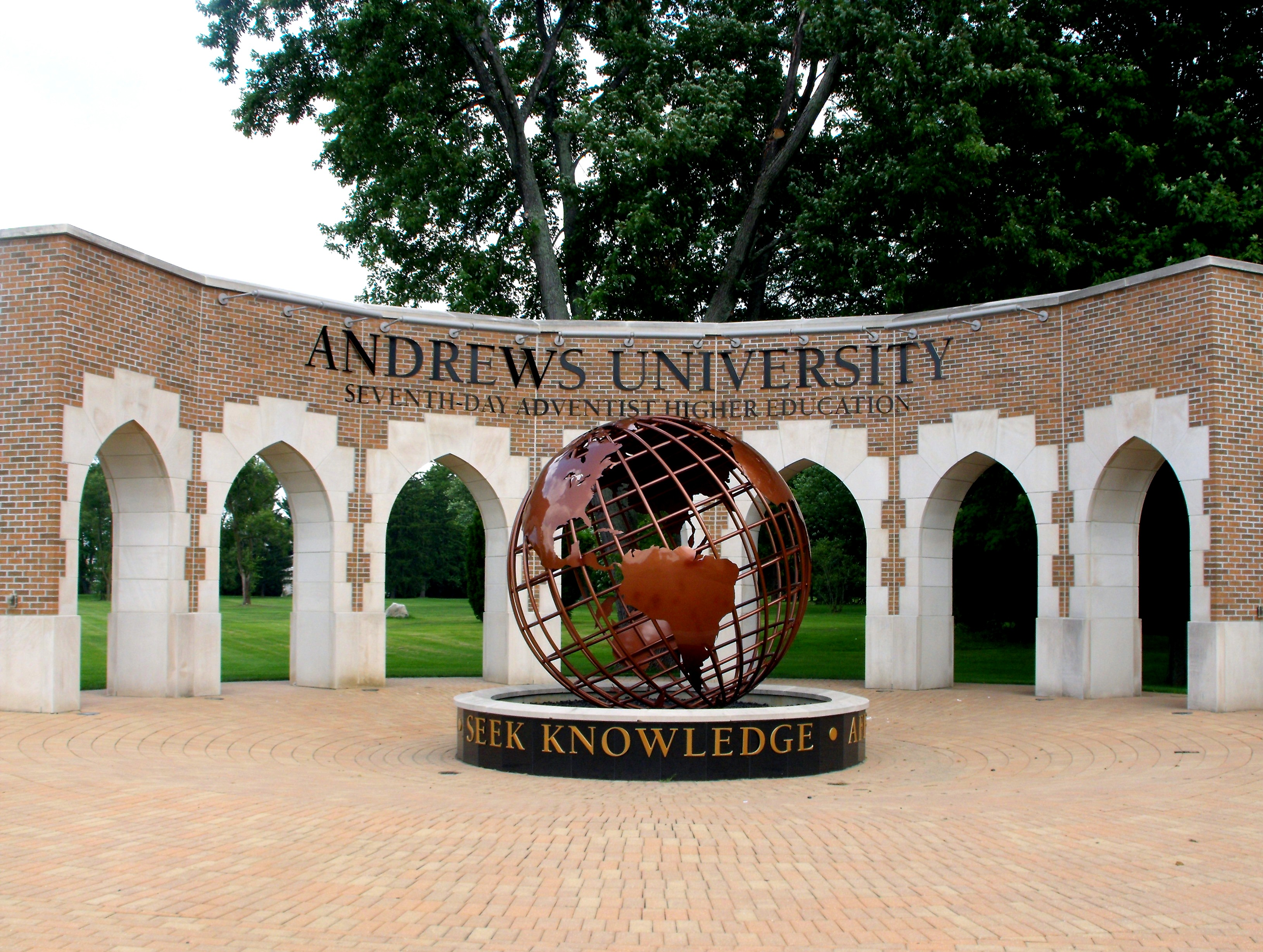
- Former names: Battle Creek College; Emmanuel Missionary College
- Motto: Corpus, Mens, Spiritus
- Type: Private university
- Established: 1874
- Religious affiliation: Seventh-day Adventist Church
- Academic affiliations: CIC
- Endowment: $70.1 million as of 2021
- President: John Wesley Taylor V
- Faculty: 197 full-time, 126 part-time (fall 2022)
- Students: 2,858 (fall 2022)
- Undergraduates: 1,295 (fall 2022)
- Postgraduates: 1,563 (fall 2022)
- Other students: 350 (Seminary)
- Location: Berrien Springs, Michigan, United States
- Campus: Rural, 1,600 acres (6.5 km^{2})
- Colors: Blue and gold
- Nickname: Cardinals
- Sporting affiliations: USCAA
- Mascot: Cardinal
- Website: www.andrews.edu

Michigan State Historic Site
- Designated: September 13, 1963

Andrews University (Andrews) is a private Seventh-day Adventist university in Berrien Springs, Michigan. Founded in 1874 as Battle Creek College, it was the first higher education facility started by Seventh-day Adventists and is the flagship university of the Seventh-day Adventist school system, the world's second largest Christian school system.

The university consists of eight schools or colleges, offering 130 undergraduate majors and 70 graduate majors in addition to graduate degree programs. It is accredited by the Higher Learning Commission and the Adventist Accrediting Association (AAA).

== History ==
=== 1874–1901: Battle Creek College ===
Andrews University was founded as a small Seventh-day Adventist school called Battle Creek College in 1874 named for the nearby city of Battle Creek, Michigan.

=== 1901–1959: Emmanuel Missionary College ===
In 1901, the school moved from Battle Creek, Michigan to its current location in Berrien Springs. It is said that everything the school had was packed up in 16 boxcars and sent on its way. The school was renamed "Emmanuel Missionary College", or EMC for short, as "the first school among us having a distinctive Biblical name".

After this SDA college that had been known as Battle Creek College moved to Berrien Springs, Dr. John Harvey Kellogg opened a new Battle Creek College in Battle Creek under his presidency in 1923, by bringing together the existing Training School for Nurses, the School of Home Economics, and the School of Physical Education. This Battle Creek College operated until 1938.

Emmanuel Missionary College continued to grow slowly through the early 20th century. In the 1940s, Nethery Hall, the current location of the College of Arts and Sciences, was built as the administration building. Its construction marked the culmination of an aggressive building program.

==== SDA Theological Seminary ====
In the 1930s Seventh-day Adventist leaders established a Theological Seminary. At first, it was located on the campus of Pacific Union College in the Napa Valley, California. Later it was moved to Washington, D.C., and located near the denominational headquarters.

=== 1959–1974: Andrews University ===
The following events culminated in relocating the graduate program and theological seminary of Potomac University from Washington, D.C., and joining with the school in Berrien Springs in 1959.

==== Potomac University ====
In 1956, denominational leaders decided to organize a university in order to train elementary and secondary teachers in an Adventist school rather than send them to an unaffiliated university which did not promote a denominational perspective."

In 1956 a charter was granted. The new school was named Potomac University. Earlier, Ellen White, cofounder of the Adventist Church, had advised that Adventist schools locate in rural settings. Church leaders looked for a suitable rural location where the new university could be near to, and in affiliation with, Washington Missionary College, now Washington Adventist University. Over a period of two years effort was put forth to find such a location. Finally the idea was abandoned. Too much expense was involved in making such a move.

At the 1958 Autumn Council, held in Washington, the board of Emmanuel Missionary College invited the General Conference to locate Potomac University on its campus. After careful deliberation, the council voted unanimously to accept the offer and move the institution to the EMC campus.

Arrangements similar to those envisioned for Washington Missionary College were made with EMC. Emmanuel Missionary College did not lose its identity. It remained the college for the youth of the Lake Union Conference, but was affiliated with the new Seventh-day Adventist university.

In 1959, H. L. Rudy, a vice-president for the SDA General Conference, described the relationship of the new graduate university with Emmanuel Missionary College:

Potomac University (a new name is under study) has been founded to meet the graduate needs of students, teachers, ministers, and^ other workers of the church. As a "university-type General Conference institution" it draws students from the entire world field. The undergraduate school—Emmanuel Missionary College—will continue to recruit its students from its own territory, but the Seminary and the School of Graduate Studies may recruit students from the entire world field.

==== Andrews University ====
Because of the addition of the graduate programs and the seminary in 1960, the school was renamed "Andrews University" in honor of John Nevins Andrews, an Adventist scholar and the first officially sponsored overseas missionary for the Seventh-day Adventist Church.

On April 18, 1957, the Minutes of the General Conference Committee report gave the conclusion that " the name of the graduate school be Adventist University" Three years later, the April 5, 1960, Minutes of the General Conference Committee's Spring Meeting recommended that it be Andrews University, saying "This name was chosen because it honors our first missionary, a scholarly, dedicated man, J. N, Andrews, and is a name that has a very strong Adventist appeal.

Today the seminary is known as the Seventh-day Adventist Theological Seminary.

A marker designating the college as a Michigan Historic Site was erected by the Michigan Historical Commission. The inscription reads:

This, the oldest Seventh-day Adventist college and the pioneer in a world-wide system of Christian education, was chartered in 1874 at Battle Creek as Battle Creek College. It was moved to Berrien Springs in 1901 where its name was changed to Emmanuel Missionary College. The first classes here were held in tents. The old Berrien County Courthouse served as an administration building. Permanent buildings were erected by student labor. In 1960 the Adventists' Theological Seminary, founded in 1934, and the Graduate School (1957), were moved here from Washington, D.C., to join Emmanuel Missionary College under one charter as Andrews University. The name honors a pioneer Adventist author, administrator, and missionary, John Nevins Andrews.

=== 1974–present ===
In 1974, the undergraduate division of Andrews was organized into two colleges—the College of Arts & Sciences and the College of Technology. The School of Business Administration, which evolved from the Department of Business Administration, was established in 1980. In a similar move, the Department of Education became the School of Education in 1983. In 1993, the Department of Architecture became the Division of Architecture, and is now the School of Architecture, Art & Design. At the same time existing and new programs in technology were restructured and a new School of Health Professions was opened in 2012.

The present organizational structure of the School of Graduate Studies was adopted in 1987. Now the School of Graduate Studies & Research, it oversees graduate programs and research activities campus-wide.

Griggs University joined Andrews in 2011 to become the School of Distance Education. It extends access to Adventist education beyond campus, community and national boundaries. It supports all schools in delivery of degrees at national and international locations, while also promoting and modeling best practices in distance education.

On Thursday, April 11, 2007, President Niels-Erik Andreasen announced at a special chapel assembly that the university had just received a gift totaling $8.5 million. The anonymous donors requested the money be spent on the following: Construction of the new entrance on Old US 31 (officially opened on June 2, 2008, and named J. N. Andrews Blvd.), Two endowed chairs: one for the Marketing Department in the School of Business Administration and the second in the Seventh-day Adventist Theological Seminary's Christian Ministry Department, Construction of a milking parlor for the Andrews Dairy, Refurbish the kitchen and dining facilities in the Campus Center, and Support for the educational program of the Aeronautics Department.

== Campus ==
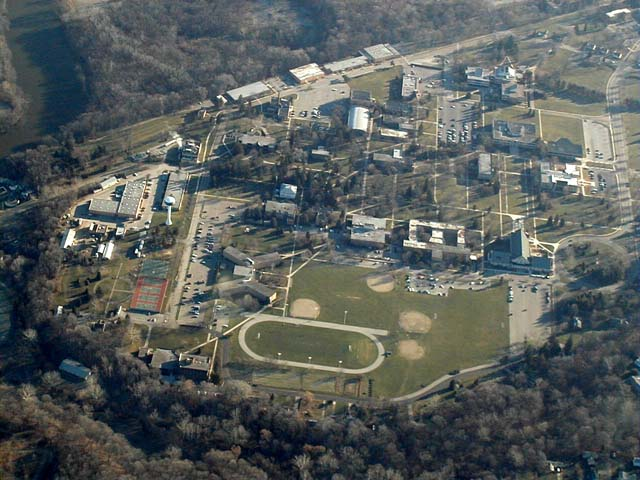
Aerial view of Andrews University, 2006

Andrews University is located in the Village of Berrien Springs in southwest Michigan. The campus is adjacent to the St. Joseph River and 12 miles (19 km) away from the shores of Lake Michigan. South Bend, Indiana, home of the University of Notre Dame, is 25 miles (40 km) away; thus, some Andrews faculty members hold joint appointments with Notre Dame.

The 1,600-acre (6.5 km^{2}) campus is officially designated as an arboretum. The campus maintains a variety of indigenous trees, especially around the quad in the center of the campus. The campus is composed of 27 instructional buildings, the Howard Performing Arts Center, an airpark, four single-sex residence halls and four apartment complexes.

The four dormitories on campus are Lamson Hall, the undergraduate women's hall, Damazo Hall, the graduate women's hall, Meier Hall, the undergraduate men's hall, and Burman Hall, primarily for men who are either graduate or seminary students. The residence halls strictly enforce a curfew depending on a student's age, as well as a visitation policy which does not allow students of the opposite sex in dorm rooms at any time. Students living on-campus are also required to attend a number of worship services.

=== Public art ===
Artworks on the campus include Corten Steel Sculpture, Legacy of Leadership, and Regeneration.

Corten Steel Sculpture (1966–1967) was designed by Timothy Malone while he was a graduate student and part-time instructor at the University of Notre Dame. The corten steel sculpture weighs 1,300 pounds (590 kg) and bears the Andrews University motto and the text "Corpus, Mens, Spiritus" on one side; the opposite side displays an imperfect circle that represents the globe and two curved meridian lines. It was supposed to be installed in December 1966, but was postponed until April 1967 due to Malone's illness and an "imbalance" in the sculpture.

== Academics ==
Following a major reorganization in 2019, the university is currently made up of five major academic units, offering 130 undergraduate majors and 70 graduate majors. In addition, post-graduate degrees in several areas are supervised by the School of Graduate Studies. Its most popular undergraduate majors, in terms of 2021 graduates, were:

Biology/Biological Sciences (32)
Registered Nursing/Registered Nurse (26)
General Studies (19)
Engineering (16)
Physical Therapy/Therapist (15)

The university's freshmen retention rate is 83.9% while the graduation rate is 53.3%.

=== College of Health & Human Services ===
The College of Health & Human Services was organized in 2019. The change incorporated the previously named School of Health Professions, which included all of the health-related sciences. The college currently includes the School of Architecture and Interior Design, the School of Communication Sciences & Disorders, the School of Nursing, the School fo Population Health, Nutrition & Wellness, the School of Rehabilitation Sciences, and the Department of Medical Laboratory Sciences. Emmanuel Rudatsikira was appointed the first dean of the College of Health & Human Services, and is currently still serving in this role.

==== School of Architecture & Interior Design ====
The School of Architecture began as a simple architecture program in 1974, offering an associate degree. The program received full accreditation as a bachelors program in 1987. In 2002 the program was approved to offer a 5 1/2-year National Architectural Accrediting Board–accredited masters of architecture. On October 29, 2007, the Board of Trustees voted the Division of Architecture to be reclassified as the School of Architecture. In January 2012, the School of Architecture was merged with the Department of Art & Design to form the School of Architecture, Art & Design. As a result, two new majors were introduced in the architecture program: Interior Design and Construction Management. In 2016 departments were again reorganized, with the art and design portions of the school leaving the School of Architecture and joining the Department of Communication, creating the School of Architecture & Interior Design and the Department of Visual Art, Communication & Design. Lionel Johnson is the current chair of the School of Architecture & Interior Design.

Previous projects by the School of Architecture include community plans for Palmer (Alaska), Empire, Suttons Bay, Traverse City and Wayne (Michigan), Billings (Montana), Michigan City and Plymouth (Indiana), and Henderson Point and Saucier (Mississippi). The Andrews University School of Architecture is one of five accredited architecture programs in the United States located at a Christian university. In 2020, the school received an open letter from their current and former students who were victims of racism perpetuated by the department.

=== College of Arts & Sciences ===
The College of Arts & Sciences, which was officially organized in 1974, is the largest of the university's six schools. It is divided into thirteen departments covering a wide range of subjects encompassing the fine arts, the sciences, the humanities, and the social sciences. Anthony Bosman is the current dean of the College of Arts & Sciences.

The college also offers pre-professional programs in law, health, optometry, dentistry, medicine, veterinary medicine among others. A number of graduates go on to attend Loma Linda University, a Seventh-day Adventist institution with the only Protestant Christian medical school and dental school in the United States, for a professional education in medicine, dentistry and other health-related disciplines.

=== College of Professions ===
The College of Professions includes the School of Business Administration, the Department of Aviation, and the Department of Computing. Kimberly Pichot is currently the dean of the College of Professions.

==== School of Business Administration ====
The School of Business Administration first began to offer graduate education in business in 1964. It has been housed in its current location in Chan Shun Hall since 1989 and offers Bachelor of Business Administration, Master of Science in Administration and Master of Business Administration degrees. The school is a member of the Accreditation Council for Business Schools and Programs (ACBSP).

=== College of Education & International Services ===
The College of Education & International Services includes the School of Education, the School of Leadership, the School of Graduate Psychology and Counseling, and the School of Distance Education. Alayne Thorpe is the current dean of the College of Education & International Services.

==== School of Education ====
The School of Education offers bachelors (BA, BS), masters (MA, MAT), education specialist (EdS) and doctoral degree (EdD, PhD) programs in thirty-one different programs of education. Also housed within the school is the university's leadership program, which offers graduate degrees in various areas of leadership. The university also has an undergraduate program in leadership, which currently awards certificates rather than degrees.

==== School of Distance Education & International Partnerships ====
The School of Distance Education & International Partnerships (formerly Griggs University/Griggs International Academy) was formally transferred to the ownership of Andrews University on November 1, 2010. It is housed in Griggs Hall B near the main campus entrance on Old US-31. In 2016 the School of Distance Education was given the extended name of School of Distance Education & International Partnerships, reflecting more of the school's focus on partnering with sister schools and extension campuses around the globe.

=== Seventh-day Adventist Theological Seminary ===
The Seventh-day Adventist Theological Seminary was voted into existence in 1936 by action of the General Conference of the Seventh-day Adventist Church. It operated in Washington, D.C., until 1960, when it was transferred to Berrien Springs, Michigan. There it became a school at the newly established Andrews University. The seminary is fully accredited by The Association of Theological Schools in the United States and Canada.

The primary mission of the Seminary is to prepare ministers for the Seventh-day Adventist Church. This is done especially by means of the 3-year Master of Divinity program. There are also 2-year master's programs in Youth Ministry and in Pastoral Ministry. In addition, the Seminary offers the 1–2 year academic Master of Arts in Religion program and the Master of Theology. Three doctoral programs are also offered: Doctor of Ministry, Doctor of Philosophy in Religion, and Doctor of Theology. Andrews University was the first institution to offer a PhD in Adventist studies.

The Seminary has six departments: Christian Ministry, Church History, Discipleship & Religious Education, New Testament, Old Testament, Theology & Christian Philosophy, and World Mission. The current dean of the Seminary is Jiři Moskala.

=== College of Technology ===
The College of Technology which began in 1974 was formally dissolved in 2012. Its former departments were relocated to other schools. The Department of Visual Art & Design is now joined with the Department of Communication to create the Department of Visual Art, Communication & Design. The Department of Engineering & Computer Science became part of the College of Arts & Sciences while the Department of Aviation was a stand-alone department until it joined with the School of Business Administration in 2017. The Department of Agriculture was also a stand-alone department overseen by an assistant to the president/provost until 2015 when it joined the College of Arts & Sciences. In 2019 it changed its name to the Department of Sustainable Agriculture and began the process of re-purposing the buildings of the former dairy (1907-2018) into an Agriculture Education Center.

=== J. N. Andrews Honors Program ===
The J. N. Andrews Honors program provides a learning community and curriculum focused on critical thinking, discussion, and debate. The program is a member of the Upper Midwest Honors Council, the Michigan Honors Association, and the National Collegiate Honors Council. Designed to offer both advanced general education coursework and monitored undergraduate research to the motivated student, the J. N. Andrews Honors Program was established in 1966 by Dr. Paul E. Hamel and Dr. Merlene A. Ogden. The current curriculum, SAGES (Scholars' Alternative General Education Studies) was developed by Dr. Malcom Russell and implemented by Dr. Gordon Atkins. The current director of the program is Dr. L. Monique Pittman.

== James White Library ==
The original James White Memorial Library was constructed in 1937 as the first stand-alone library building of the university's campus, then known as Emmanuel Missionary College. In 1959 the denomination's graduate programs in theology and education moved from Takoma Park, Maryland, to Berrien Springs, forming a comprehensive university for the growing needs of the world church. Paulette McLean Johnson is the current dean of libraries at Andrews University.

The library has three branches, the Music Materials Resource Center, the Architecture Resource Center, and the Center for Adventist Research. The Library also houses the University Archives and Records. The Library also catalogs materials for the Horn Archaeological Library.

== Rankings ==
In 2021 Andrews University was ranked #298-#389 among "National Universities" by U.S. News & World Report. The following year, it was ranked #1 in Campus Ethnic Diversity among "National Universities". In 2023, Niche ranked Andrews University the #1 private university and #1 Christian college in the state of Michigan. They also ranked Andrews #14 among Christian colleges nationally, the highest ranked among Adventist colleges and universities.

== Notable people ==
Educators include:

- Eliza Happy Morton

Alumni include:

- Sir Patrick Allen
- William Harrison Anderson
- Makeda Antoine-Cambridge
- Samuele Bacchiocchi
- Delbert Baker
- Barry Black
- Greg Constantine
- Clifton Davis
- Homer Drew
- Jon Dybdahl
- Desmond Ford
- Gary Hamel
- David Hegarty
- George R. Knight
- Christopher Mwashinga
- Morihiko Nakahara
- Ole Andres Olsen
- Bud Otis
- Arthur Patrick
- Jan Paulsen
- Shirley Neil Pettis
- Wintley Phipps
- Karl Rhoads
- Ángel Manuel Rodríguez
- Bill Shadel
- John Luis Shaw
- Philip T. Sica
- George Speight
- Edwin R. Thiele
- Alden Thompson
- Merlin Tuttle
- Juan Carlos Viera
- Ellet J. Waggoner
- John David Waiheʻe III
- Michael D. West
- Surangel Whipps Jr.
- Benjamin Wilkinson
- David R. Williams
- Neal C. Wilson
- Aung La Nsang

== See also ==
- Andrews University Seminary Studies
- Andrews University Press
- Andrews Academy
- List of Seventh-day Adventist colleges and universities
- Seventh-day Adventist education
