= Battle Creek Sanitarium =

- U.S. National Register of Historic Places
- Michigan State Historic Site
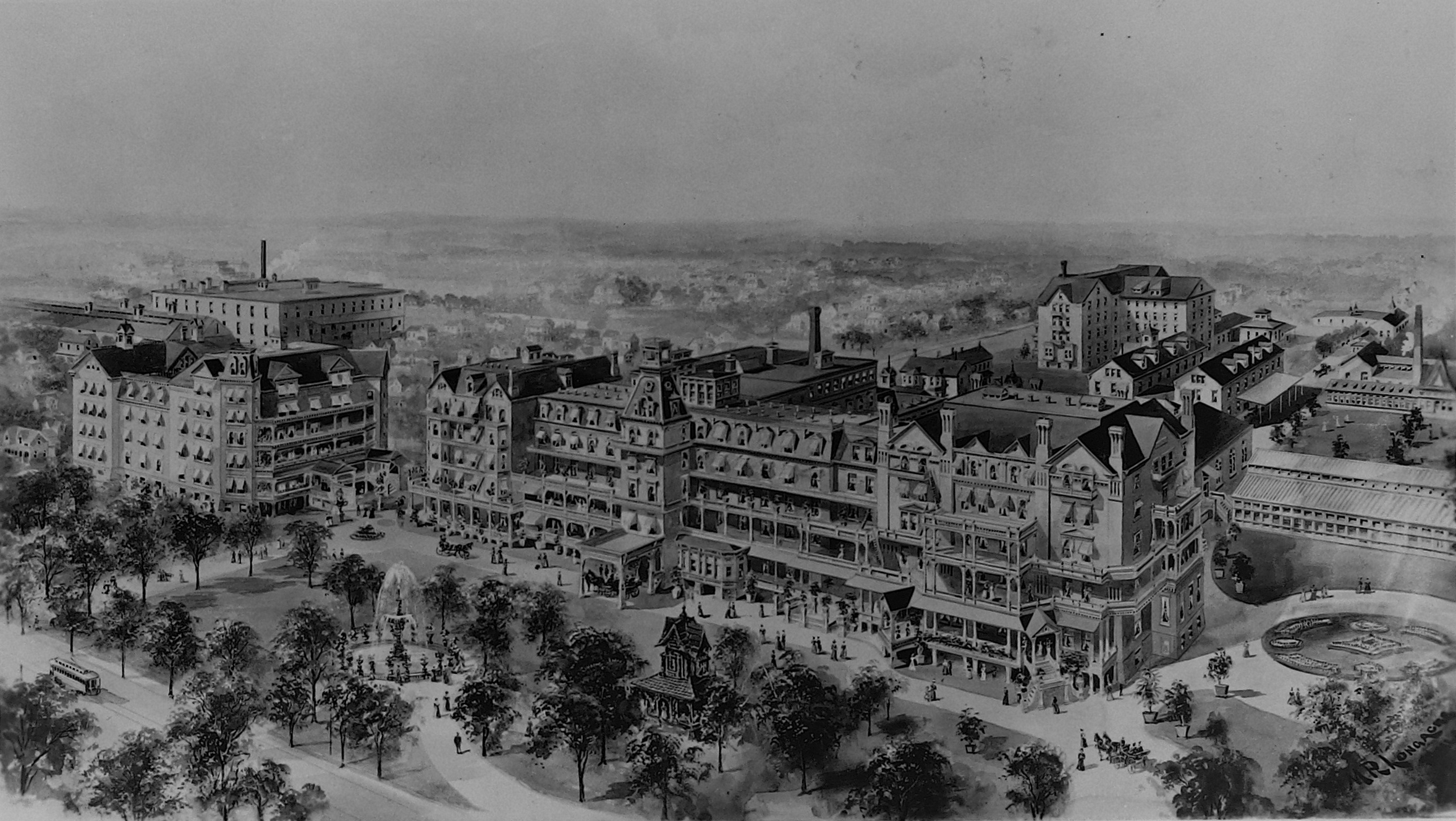
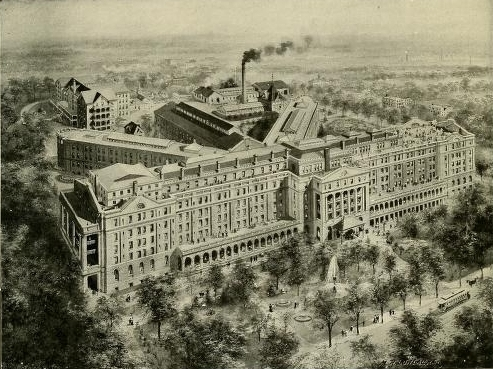
- Original Battle Creek Sanitarium main building destroyed by fire in 1902 Rebuilt Battle Creek Sanitarium and Hospital, dedicated in 1903

- Location within Michigan Location within the United States
- Interactive map showing the location of Battle Creek Sanitarium
- Location: 74 N. Washington St. Battle Creek, Michigan
- Coordinates: 42°19′37″N 85°11′16″W
- Built: 1903
- Architects: Frank Mills Andrews, M.J. Morehouse
- Architectural style: Renaissance
- NRHP reference No.: 74000980 (original); 11001060 (increase)

Significant dates
- Added to NRHP: July 30, 1974
- Boundary increase: January 27, 2012
- Designated MSHS: September 7, 1989

The Battle Creek Sanitarium was a world-renowned health resort in Battle Creek, Michigan, United States. It was founded in 1866 on health principles advocated by the Seventh-day Adventist Church, and from 1876 to 1943 was managed by Dr. John Harvey Kellogg.

The "San," as it was called, flourished under Dr. Kellogg's direction and became one of the "premier wellness destinations" in the United States. After a devastating fire in 1902 the Sanitarium was not only rebuilt, but also enlarged. At its zenith, the sprawling health and wellness complex of more than 30 buildings situated on 30 acres accommodated near thirteen hundred guests. It housed a hospital with research facilities and a nursing school, as well as the Sanitarium Food Company, among others. Following the disfellowshipping of Dr. Kellogg in 1907, the physician stated that he and his employees were "independents" who "did not belong to any church" and that the Sanitarium promoted his theory of "biologic living" based on Adventist principles. In 1928, a distinct 14-story addition to the main building, the "Towers," was constructed.

The Great Depression forced the institution to constrict and sell assets to serve its debt. In 1942, the signature main building was purchased by the U.S. Army and converted into the Percy Jones Army Hospital, and the sanatorium moved to the former Phelps Sanitarium building.

In 1957, the floundering wellness institution was taken over by the Seventh-day Adventist Church, which operated it under a different name until 1993, when it was sold. The hospital was disbanded in the 1950s and the facility was managed by the General Services Administration. In 2003, it was re-dedicated as the Hart–Dole–Inouye Federal Center.

== History ==
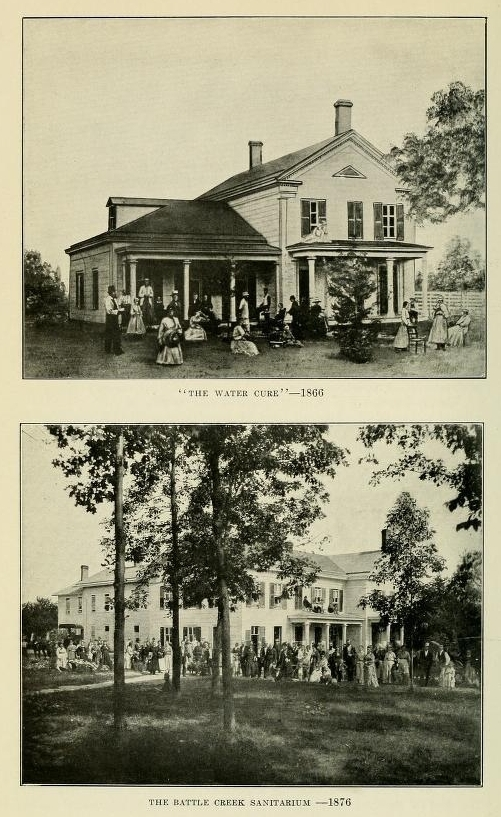
The origin of the Battle Creek Sanitarium

In May 1866, Ellen G. White presented the idea to create a health institution based on the newly developing health philosophy of the Seventh Day Adventist Church at the fourth session of the Church's General Conference in Battle Creek. The leaders of the church, including Ellen's husband James S. White agreed, and construction began on the Western Health Reform Institute, which would later become the Battle Creek Sanitarium. On September 5, 1866, the Institute opened and began accepting patients, at first under Dr. Horatio S. Lay. In 1876, Dr. John Harvey Kellogg became the medical superintendent, and his brother, W. K. Kellogg, worked as the bookkeeper. As John H. Kellogg put it, they took the word "sanatorium," which was defined back then as a health resort for invalid soldiers. In his words, "A change of two letters transformed 'sanatorium' to 'sanitarium,' and a new word was added to the English language." Kellogg stated the number of patients grew from 106 in 1866 to 7,006 patrons in 1906.

In 1878, a new wooden structure known as the "Old Main" was built on the site, going through major redevelopments in 1884 and 1891. The Old Main burned down in 1902 and was rebuilt in stone, 5-story high and enlarged.

In 1928, Battle Creek Sanitarium expanded with a 14-story high-rise with 265 guest rooms, called the "Towers," facing Champion Street. The institution went into receivership in 1933, and the Sanitarium started to vacate its main facility. In 1942, the U. S. Army purchased the main building and established the Percy Jones General Hospital; the hospital closed permanently in 1953 and one year later became the Battle Creek Federal Center. Owned by the Seventh-day Adventists, the Battle Creek Sanitarium continued to operate as a psychiatric facility through the 1970s but closed its doors by the end of the decade. In 1986, the radial wings of the main building (the solarium, gymnasium and swimming pool) were razed, and the Sanitarium entered into the final chapter of its history, which formally ended in 1993. Medical records have since been microfiched and are now kept by the nearby Fieldstone Center.

== The sanitarium system ==
=== Guest, staff, and buildings ===
Along with high numbers of patrons, there was a large number of staff at Battle Creek. Kellogg stated that "at the Battle Creek Sanitarium, the number of persons employed is never less than eight hundred, and often rises in the busiest season to more than one thousand." They comprised "physicians, nurses, helpers etc." There were 30 physicians on staff. The main buildings comprised four large buildings, chief of which was the central structure, "which affords rooming accommodations for about 400 guests ... [and] ... treatment rooms capable of handling more than 1,000 patients."

The sanitarium became a destination for both prominent and middle-class American citizens. Celebrated American figures who visited the sanitarium (including Mary Todd Lincoln and Sojourner Truth) would influence and encourage enthusiasm for health and wellness among the general population. "Battle Creek Sanitarium was world renowned and became the 'in' place for the rich and famous to seek their lost health, to listen to health lectures and to learn and practice the principles of a healthy lifestyle."

=== Therapeutic system ===
At the sanitarium, Kellogg explored various treatments for his patients, including diet reform and frequent enemas. He encouraged a low-fat, low-protein vegetarian diet with an emphasis on whole grains, fiber-rich foods, and most importantly, nuts. Kellogg also recommended a daily intake of fresh air, exercise, and the importance of hygiene. Many of the theories of John Harvey Kellogg were later published in his book The Road to Wellness. C. W. Post also worked with Dr. John Harvey Kellogg.

Kellogg described the Sanitarium system as "a composite physiologic method comprising hydrotherapy, phototherapy, thermotherapy, electrotherapy, mechanotherapy, dietetics, physical culture, cold-air cure, and health training." To assist with diagnostics and evaluation of therapeutic efficacy, various measures of physiological integrity were utilised to obtain numerous vital coefficients, "especially in relation to the integrity and efficiency of the blood, the heart, the lungs, the liver, the kidneys, stomach, intestines, brain, nerves and muscles."^{[a]}

==== Hydrotherapy ====
Hydrotherapy was widely utilized. Two three-story buildings, for men and women respectively, were devoted to hydrotherapy. Each building had a basement "devoted to rectal and bowel applications and classrooms." Both buildings were connected to the main building and the 'great gymnasium.' Kellogg, the facility's founder and owner, stated "that hydrotherapy has won a definite and permanent place in modern rational therapeutics can no longer be questioned, and the Battle Creek Sanitarium claims recognition as the pioneer in scientific hydrotherapy" in America.

Kellogg's use of hydrotherapy was a more sophisticated development of the system that was utilized in the early 19th century by Vincent Priessnitz, which, when introduced to America, was essentially a "cold water cure," although "as a tonic, cold water has no superior." The Battle Creek system utilized both hot and cold water, and correlated the use of hydrotherapy with other therapeutic modalities. Among the methods used were douches, sitz baths, cold mitten frictions, salt glows, towel rubs, wet sheet rubs, wet and dry packings, compresses, "full baths of various sorts, including Nauheim baths,^{[b]} electro-hydric baths, shallow and neutral baths." Kellogg stated his belief that use of hot and cold applications would "profound reflex effects," including vasodilation and vasoconstriction.

==== Phototherapy, thermotherapy, and electrotherapy ====
This department employed both solar and electric light, with the latter used chiefly during winter. Phototherapy held a prominent place at Battle Creek, where the first electric light bath was constructed. Regarding the application of electricity, Kellogg stated that "electricity is not capable of accomplishing half the marvels that are claimed for it by many enthusiastic electrotherapists." Nevertheless, he stated that it was valuable when used in conjunction with hydrotherapy, thermotherapy, and other methods.

==== Physical training ====
Physical exercise was an important part of the Battle Creek system, facilitating not just the improvement of muscle tone, but also of posture, respiration, and of circulation and the facilitation of anabolic and catabolic functions enabled by circulatory processes. Exercise included such components as postural, calisthetics, gymnastics, swimming, and passive methods such as mechanotherapy, vibrotherapy, mechanical massage.

==== Open-air and cold-air methods ====
Kellogg stated that exposure to the sun and open air was fundamentally important for health, including stimulation of the skin. Battle Creek had a large outdoor gymnasium. Again, the use of temperature differentials facilitated by water was a component, with exercise followed by a plunge into a fresh water swimming pool "just cool enough to be refreshing and invigorating," according to Kellogg's description of his own facility. Patients were encouraged to sleep in the open air, and a range of outdoor activities were facilitated, from wood-chopping to basketball and other games, walking, trotting, and swimming lessons. Also available were skating, tobogganing, skiing, and other outdoor sports (p. 111). "Thus all the best advantages of the seashore, camping out, 'going fishing,' and other forms of recreation are secured, while the patient is protected from excess by the careful guidance of his physician, and has the advantages of medical care, dietetic regulation, etc," stated Kellogg in reference to the resort he owned and operated.

==== Dietetics ====
Battle Creek utilized information as known at that time to provide nutritional requirements for health and well-being relative to each person's requirements. Food required careful prescriptive preparation, with care also taken to ensure appetiveness and palatability were recognized. The diet lists included "scores of special dishes and hundreds of special food preparations, each of which has been carefully studied in relation to its nutritive and therapeutic properties," with the diet lists used "by the physicians in arranging the diet prescriptions of individual patients." Also, "all the so-called Sanitarium health foods" were "regularly found on the Sanitarium bill of fare, having been originally devised solely for this use."

== Decline of the Battle Creek Sanitarium ==
After the Wall Street Crash of 1929, few previously well-to-do patients came to the sanitarium. Finances became very difficult for the "San" and the complex was put under receivership in 1933. The sanitarium stayed in business until after the beginning of World War II. The U.S. Army, needing a hospital, paid $2,341,000 and moved in, creating Percy Jones Army Hospital. The complex was later converted into a federal center and is currently named the Hart–Dole–Inouye Federal Center.

== National Register ==
The Battle Creek Sanitarium was listed on the National Register of Historic Places in 1976. The original listing included only the main building, a long six-story building in the Italian Renaissance Revival style, situated parallel to North Washington Avenue. The listing was expanded in 2012 to include the 1928 tower, other buildings built prior to 1953, and the site itself.

== Notable patients ==
- Thomas A. Edison, inventor.
- Amelia Earhart, first female aviator to fly across the Atlantic Ocean
- Warren G. Harding, 29th president of the United States
- Irving Fisher, celebrity economist and a later fellow of J. H. Kellogg's Race Betterment Foundation (eugenics)
- Henry Ford, founder of the Ford Motor Company and high-volume user of the assembly line
- James Cash Penney, founder of J.C. Penney Department Stores
- C. W. Post, founder of what is now Post Consumer Brands.
- Wayne Wheeler, Attorney, Prohibitionist, and founder of the Anti-Saloon League

== In popular culture ==
Battle Creek Sanitarium mentioned on the Murdock Mysteries series season 6, Episode 9. Victoria Cross. Murdock Mysteries Season 6 Episode 9, aproximately10 minutes into episode

Battle Creek Sanitarium is depicted in the American 1994 film The Road to Wellville by Alan Parker, with British actor Anthony Hopkins playing a highly fictionalized Dr. J.H. Kellogg in one of the leading roles. This movie ends with the fire of the sanitarium building complex. The movie is based on the book of the same name by T.C. Boyle.

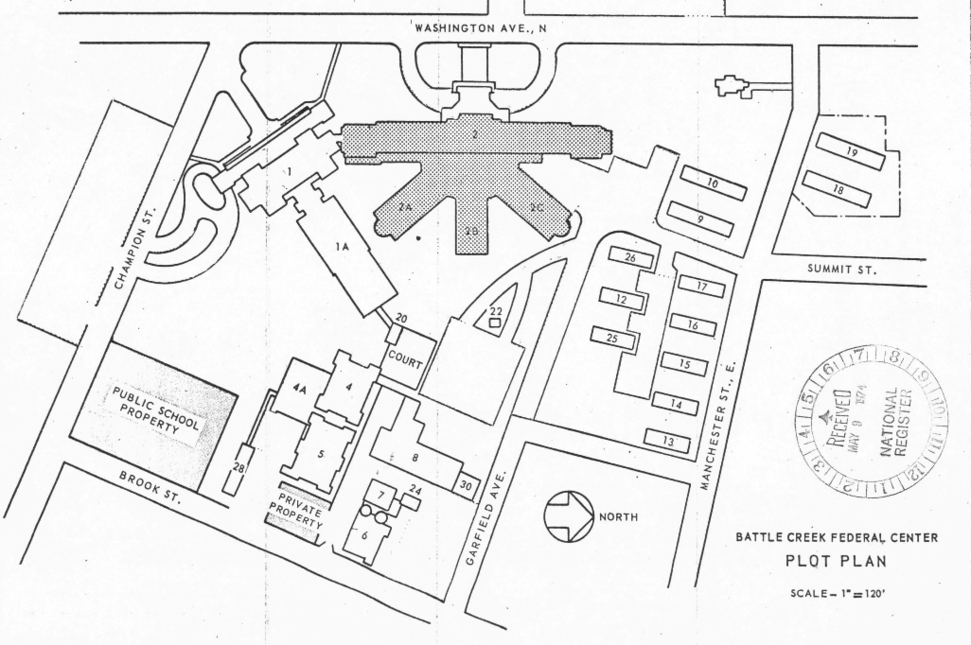
Layout of the former Battle Creek Sanitarium

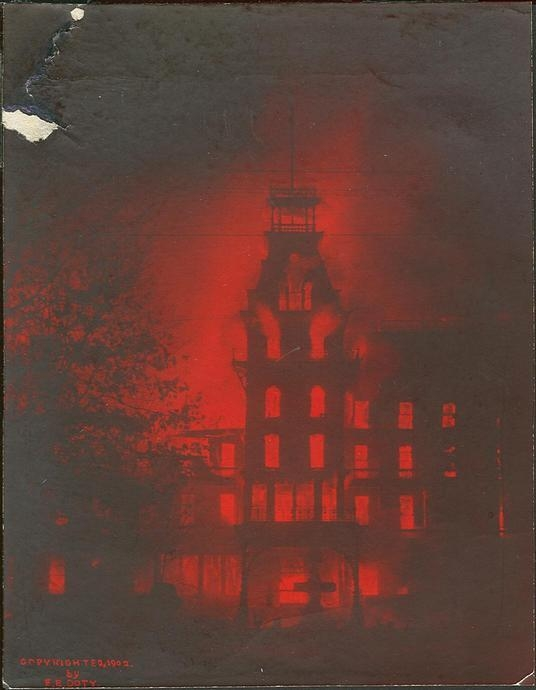
Battle Creek Sanitarium fire on February 18, 1902

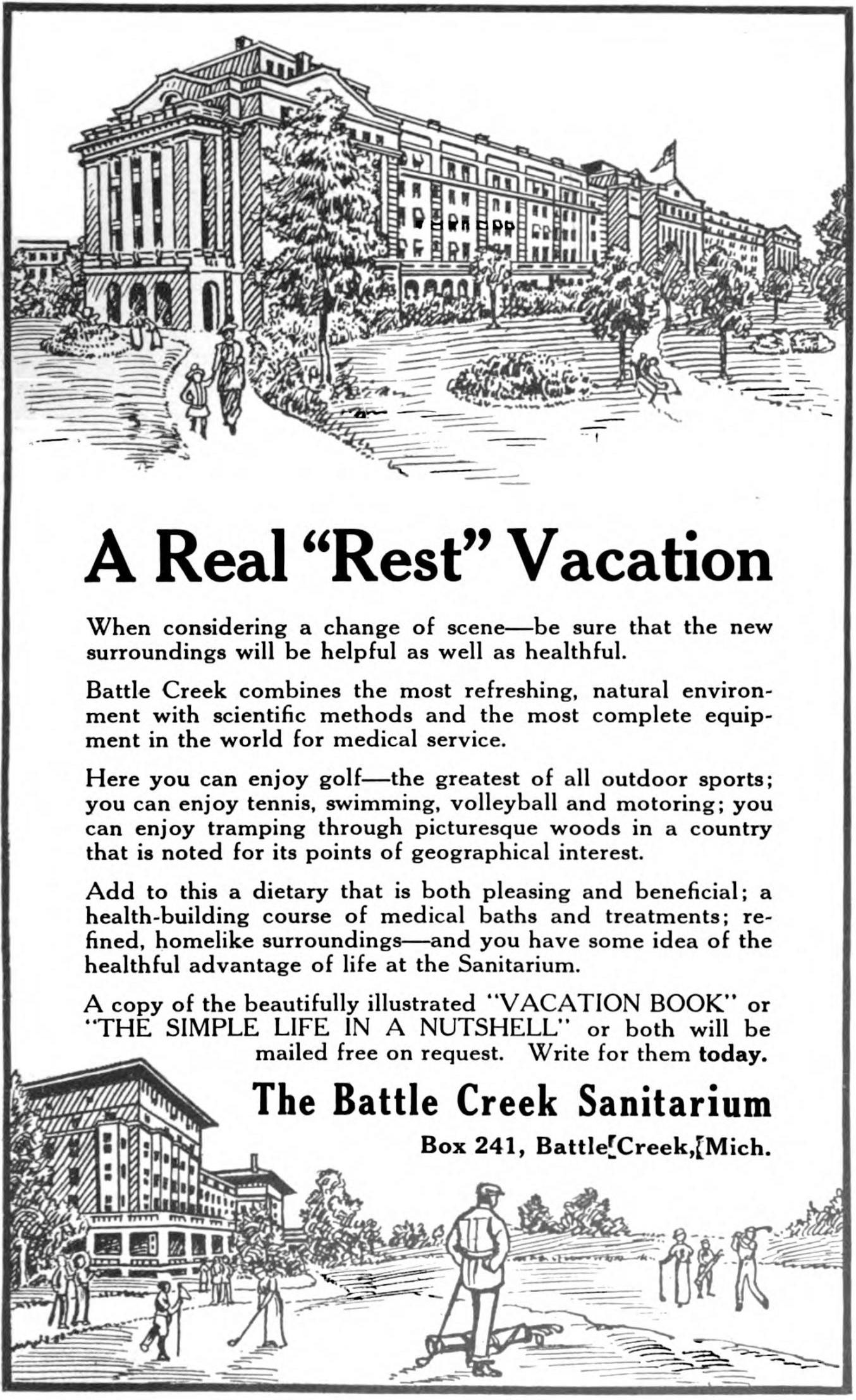
Battle Creek Sanitarium ad, Golfers Magazine March 1916

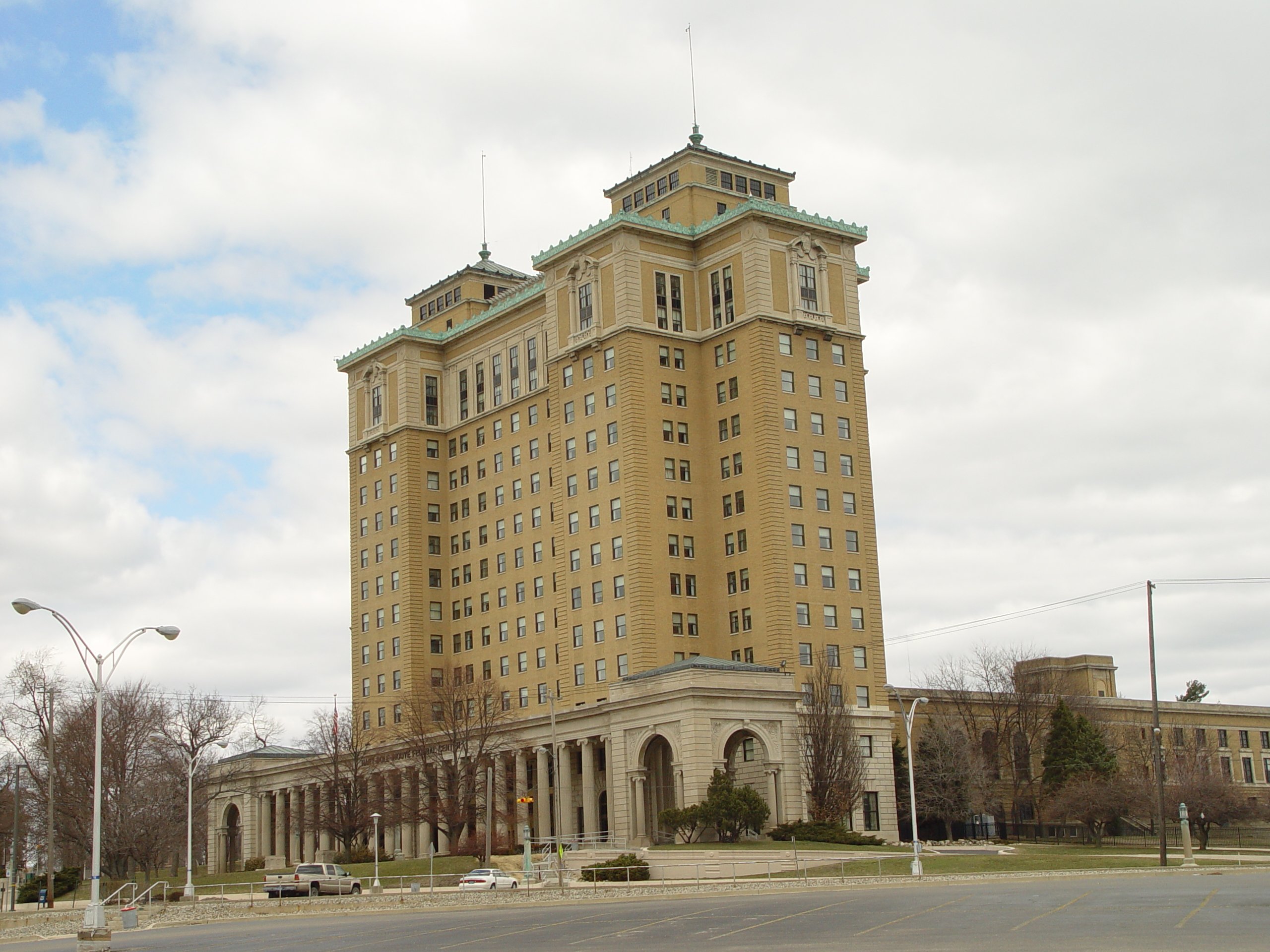
The "Towers," a 14-story sanitarium skyscraper built in 1928, now the Hart–Dole–Inouye Federal Center

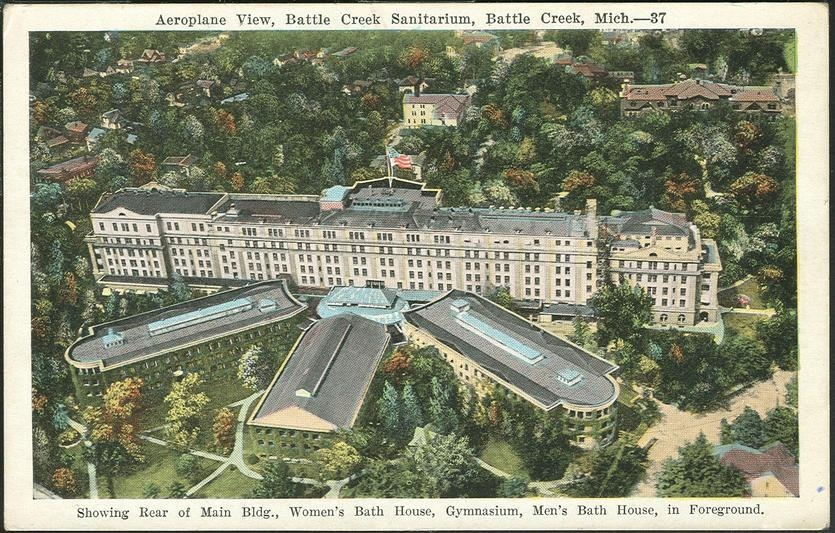
Postcard with an aerial view of sanitarium, c. 1928

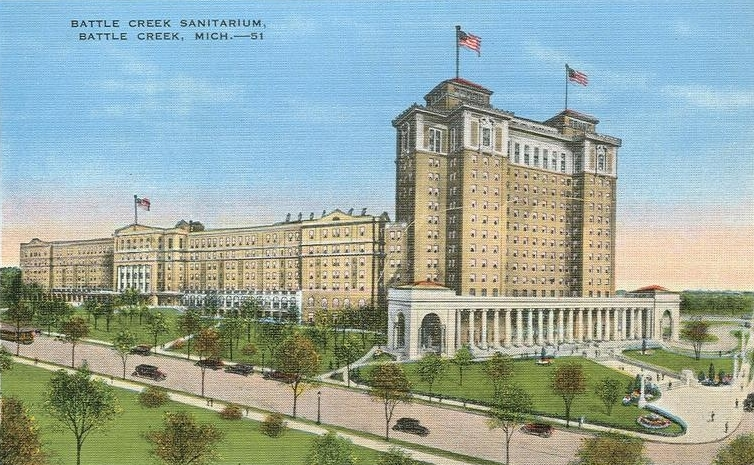
Postcard with a view of sanitarium with the tower addition, c. 1930

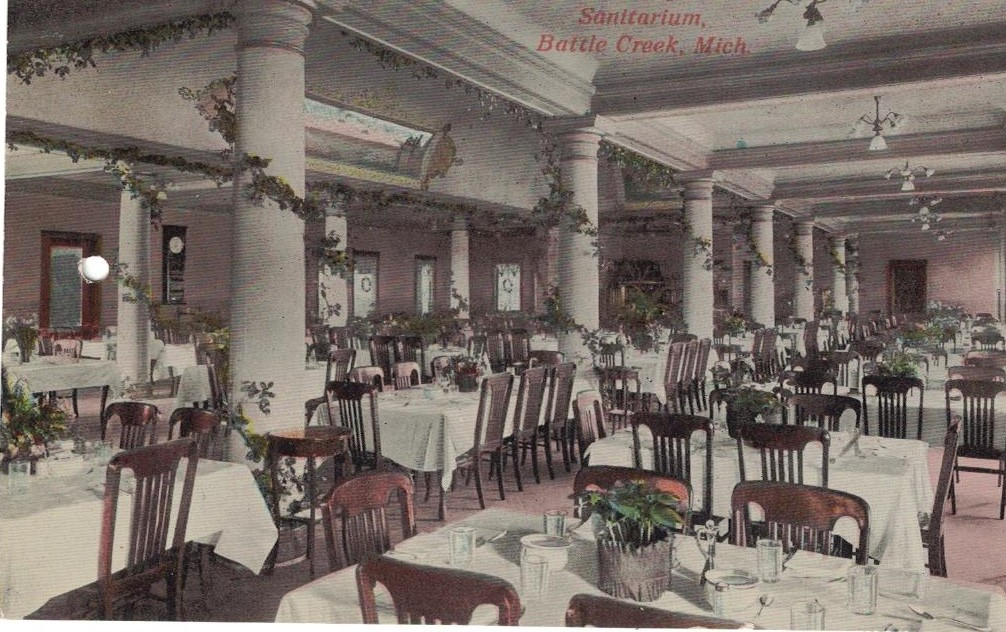
Main Dining Room

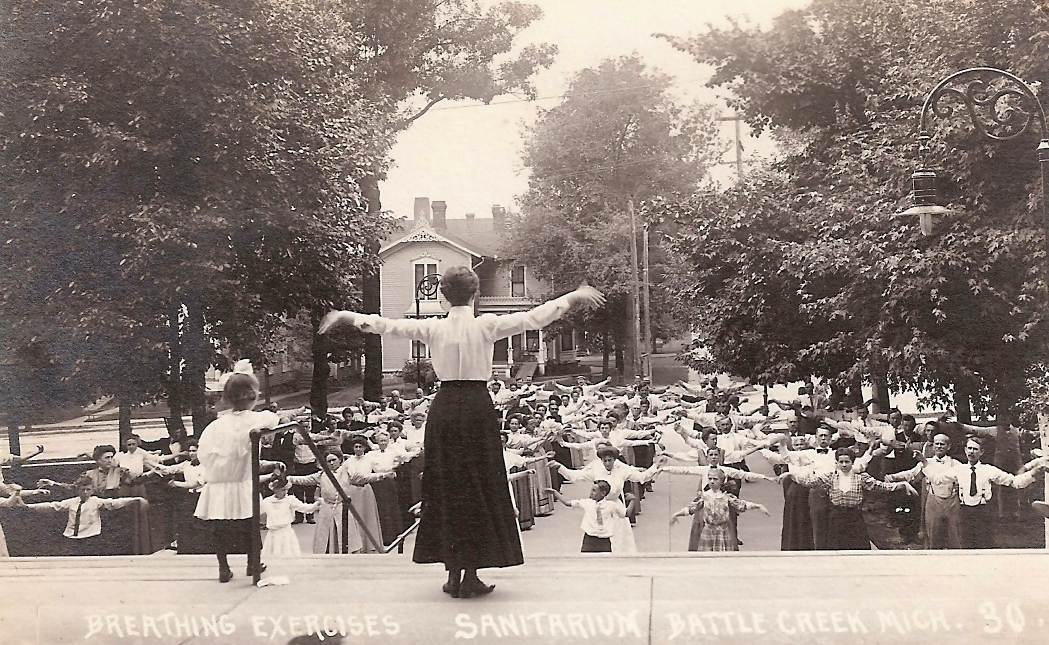
Turn-of-the-20th-century breathing exercises

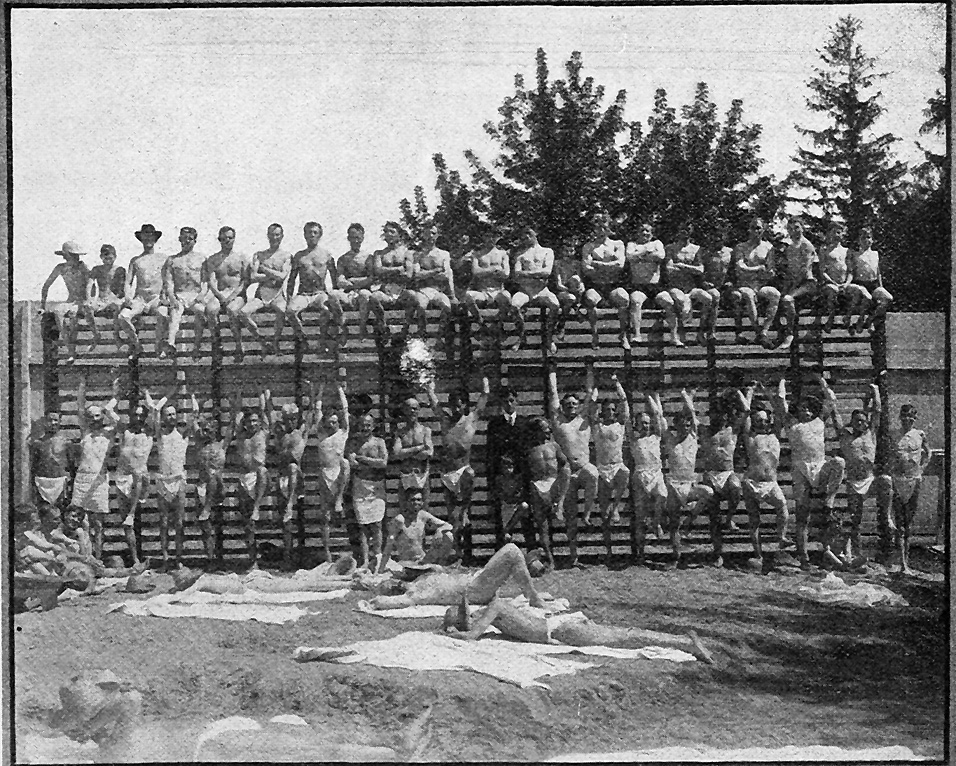
Sunbathing at the Battle Creek Sanitarium

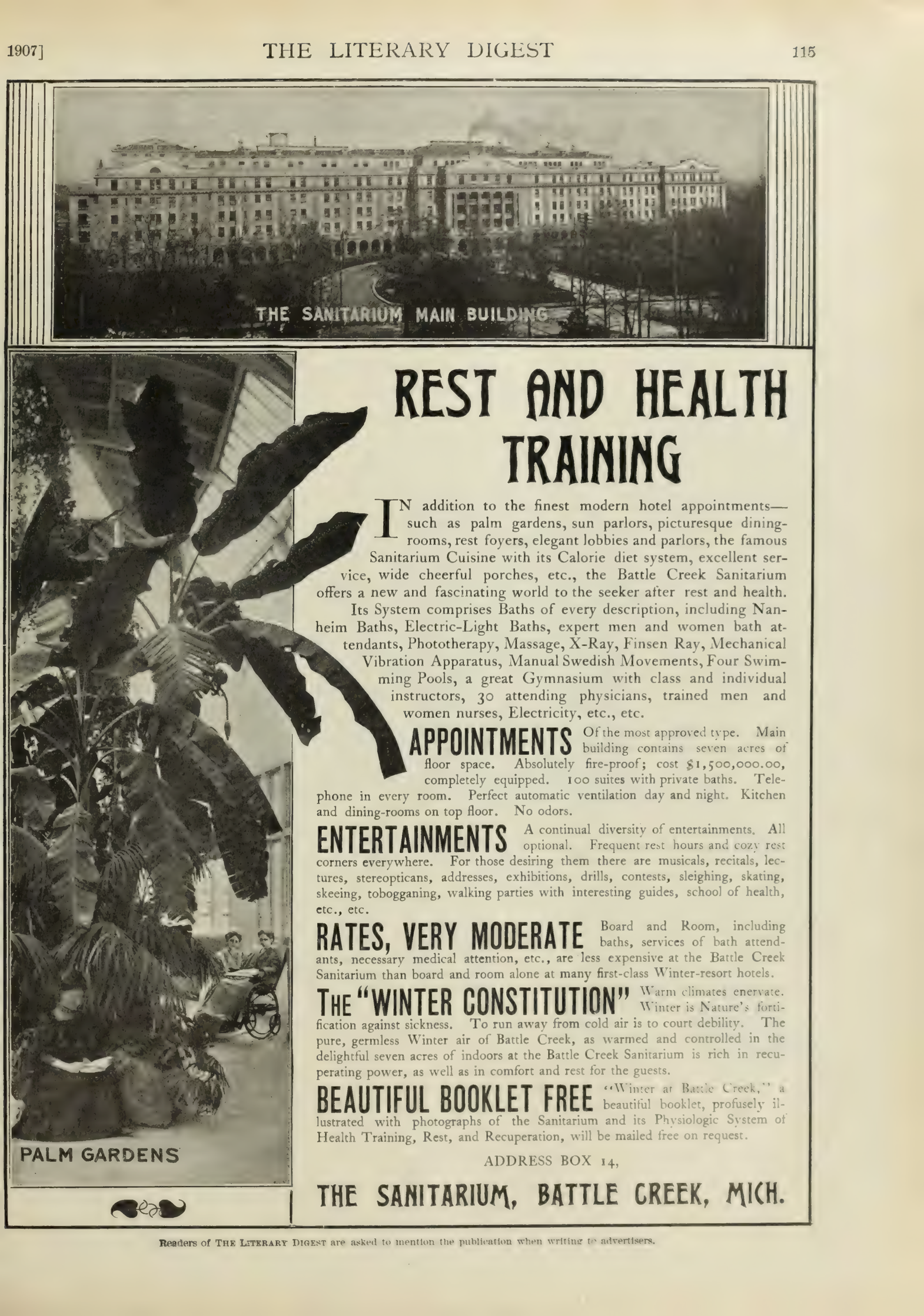
Battle Creek Sanitarium ad, The Literary Digest January 19, 1907

== Notes ==
a.' A persual of the main body of the text reveals an impressive use of the available scientific methods of the day. However, the synopsis from the contents page is hard to beat for succinctness, hence the quotations.

b.' A Nauheim (or 'effervescent') bath is a type of spa bath through which carbon dioxide is bubbled. It is named after the German spa town.
