= John Harvey Kellogg =

American physician (1852–1943)

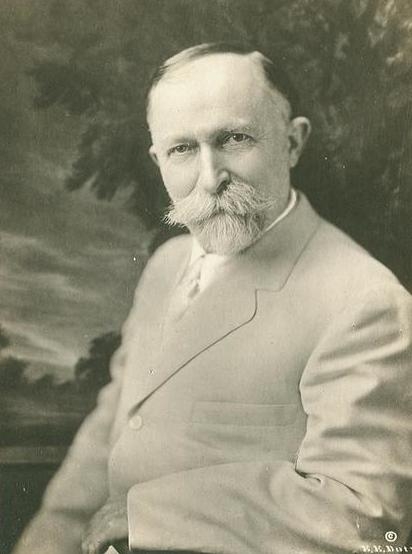
- Kellogg, c. 1915
- Born: February 26, 1852; Tyrone, Michigan, US
- Died: December 14, 1943 (aged 91); Battle Creek, Michigan, US
- Education: Michigan State Normal School; Hygeio-Therapeutic College; University of Michigan Medical School; Bellevue Hospital Medical College (MD)
- Occupations: Physician, nutritionist
- Known for: Corn flakes; Battle Creek Sanitarium; Kellanova (Kellogg's)
- Spouse: Ella Ervilla Eaton (m. 1879; died 1920)
- Relatives: Will Keith Kellogg (brother)

Signature
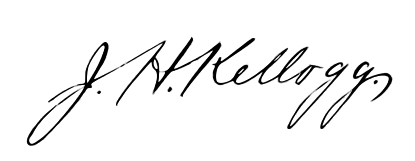

John Harvey Kellogg (February 26, 1852 – December 14, 1943) was an American businessman, inventor, physician, and advocate of the health reforms advocated by the Battle Creek Progressive Friends movement and the eugenics policies espoused by many in the Progressive Movement. He was the director of the Battle Creek Sanitarium in Battle Creek, Michigan, founded by members of the Seventh-day Adventist Church. It combined aspects of a European spa, a hydrotherapy institution, a hospital, and a high-class hotel. Kellogg treated the rich and famous, as well as the poor who could not afford other hospitals. According to Encyclopædia Britannica, he "developed numerous nut and vegetable products to vary the diet of the patients, including a flaked-wheat cereal called Granose and cornflakes. Although cornflakes were not new, they had never before been presented as a breakfast food [...] Kellogg was [also] a cofounder of the Race Betterment Foundation, an organization that promoted eugenics and racial segregation."

An early proponent of the germ theory of disease, Kellogg was well ahead of his time in relating intestinal flora and the presence of bacteria in the intestines to health and disease. The sanitarium approached treatment in a holistic manner, actively promoting vegetarianism, nutrition, the use of yogurt enemas to clear "intestinal flora", exercise, sun-bathing, and hydrotherapy, as well as abstinence from smoking tobacco, drinking alcoholic beverages, and sexual activity. Kellogg dedicated the last 30 years of his life to promoting eugenics and racial segregation. Kellogg was a major leader in progressive health reform, particularly in the second phase of the clean living movement. He wrote extensively on science and health. His approach to "biologic living" combined scientific knowledge with Adventist beliefs and the promotion of health reform and temperance. Many of the vegetarian foods that Kellogg developed and offered his patients were publicly marketed: Kellogg's brother, Will Keith Kellogg, is best known today for the invention of the breakfast cereal corn flakes.

Kellogg held liberal Christian theological beliefs radically different from mainstream Nicene Christianity and emphasized what he saw as the importance of human reason over many aspects of traditional doctrinal authority. He strongly rejected fundamentalist and conservative notions of original sin, human depravity, and the atonement of Jesus, viewing the last in terms of "his exemplary life" on Earth rather than death. Kellogg was a Seventh-day Adventist (SDA) as the group's beliefs shifted towards Trinitarianism during the 1890s, and Adventists were "unable to accommodate the essentially liberal understanding of Christianity" exhibited by Kellogg, viewing his theology as pantheistic and unorthodox. His disagreements with other members of the SDA Church led to a major schism: he was disfellowshipped in 1907, but continued to adhere to many of the church's beliefs and directed the sanitarium until his death. Kellogg helped to establish the American Medical Missionary College in 1895. Popular misconceptions have wrongly attributed various cultural practices, inventions, and historical events to Kellogg.

== Early life ==
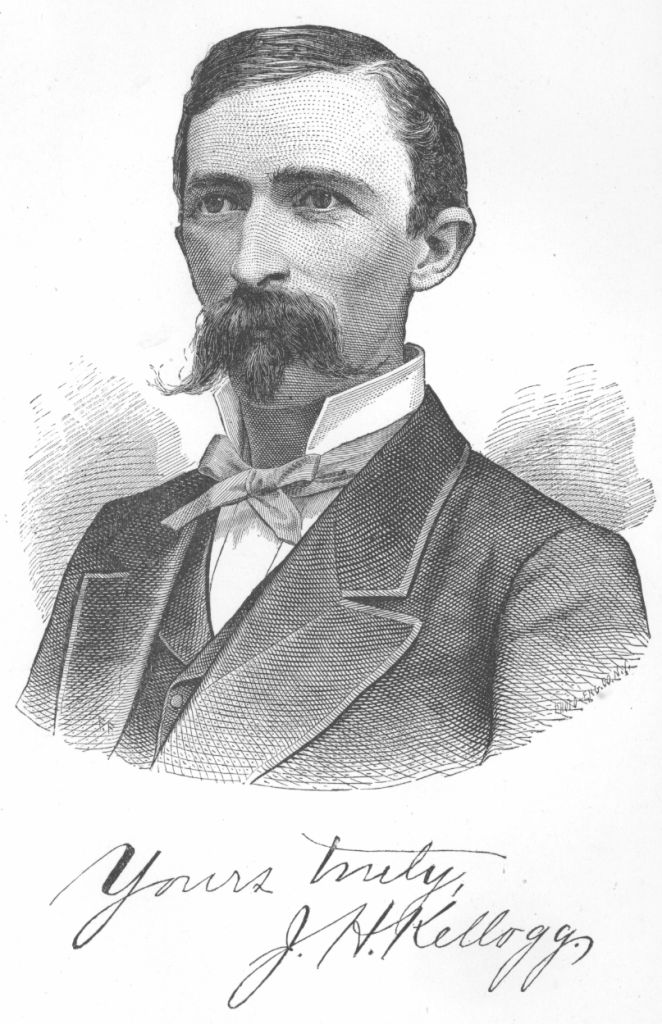
Kellogg in 1881, aged about 29

John Harvey Kellogg was born in Tyrone, Michigan, on February 26, 1852, to John Preston Kellogg (1806–1881) and his second wife Ann Janette Stanley (1824–1893). His father, John Preston Kellogg, was born in Hadley, Massachusetts; his ancestry can be traced back to the founding of Hadley, Massachusetts, where a great-grandfather operated a ferry. John Preston Kellogg and his family moved to Michigan in 1834, and after his first wife's death and his remarriage in 1842, to a farm in Tyrone Township. In addition to six children from his first marriage, John Preston Kellogg had 11 children with his second wife Ann, including John Harvey and his younger brother, Will Keith Kellogg.

John Preston Kellogg became a member of several revivalist movements, including the Baptists, the Congregationalist Church, and finally the Seventh-day Adventist Church. He was one of four adherents who pledged substantial sums to convince Seventh-day Adventists Ellen G. White and her husband James Springer White to relocate to Battle Creek, Michigan, with their publishing business, in 1855. He persuaded a Seventh-day Adventist couple, Daniel H. Kress and Lauretta E. Kress, to become doctors at Michigan where he had studied; they were early founders of what became Washington Adventist Hospital. In 1856, the Kellogg family moved to Battle Creek to be near other members of the denomination. There John Preston Kellogg established a broom factory. The Kelloggs believed that the Second Coming of Christ was imminent, and that formal education of their children was therefore unnecessary. Originally a sickly child, John Harvey Kellogg attended Battle Creek public schools only briefly, from ages 9–11. He left school to work sorting brooms in his father's broom factory. Nonetheless, he read voraciously and acquired a broad but largely self-taught education. At age 12, John Harvey Kellogg was offered work by the Whites. He became one of their protégés, rising from errand boy to printer's devil, and eventually doing proofreading and editorial work. He helped to set articles for Health, or how to live and The Health Reformer, becoming familiar with Ellen G. White's theories of health, and beginning to follow recommendations such as a vegetarian diet. Ellen White described her husband's relationship with John Harvey Kellogg as closer than that with his own children.

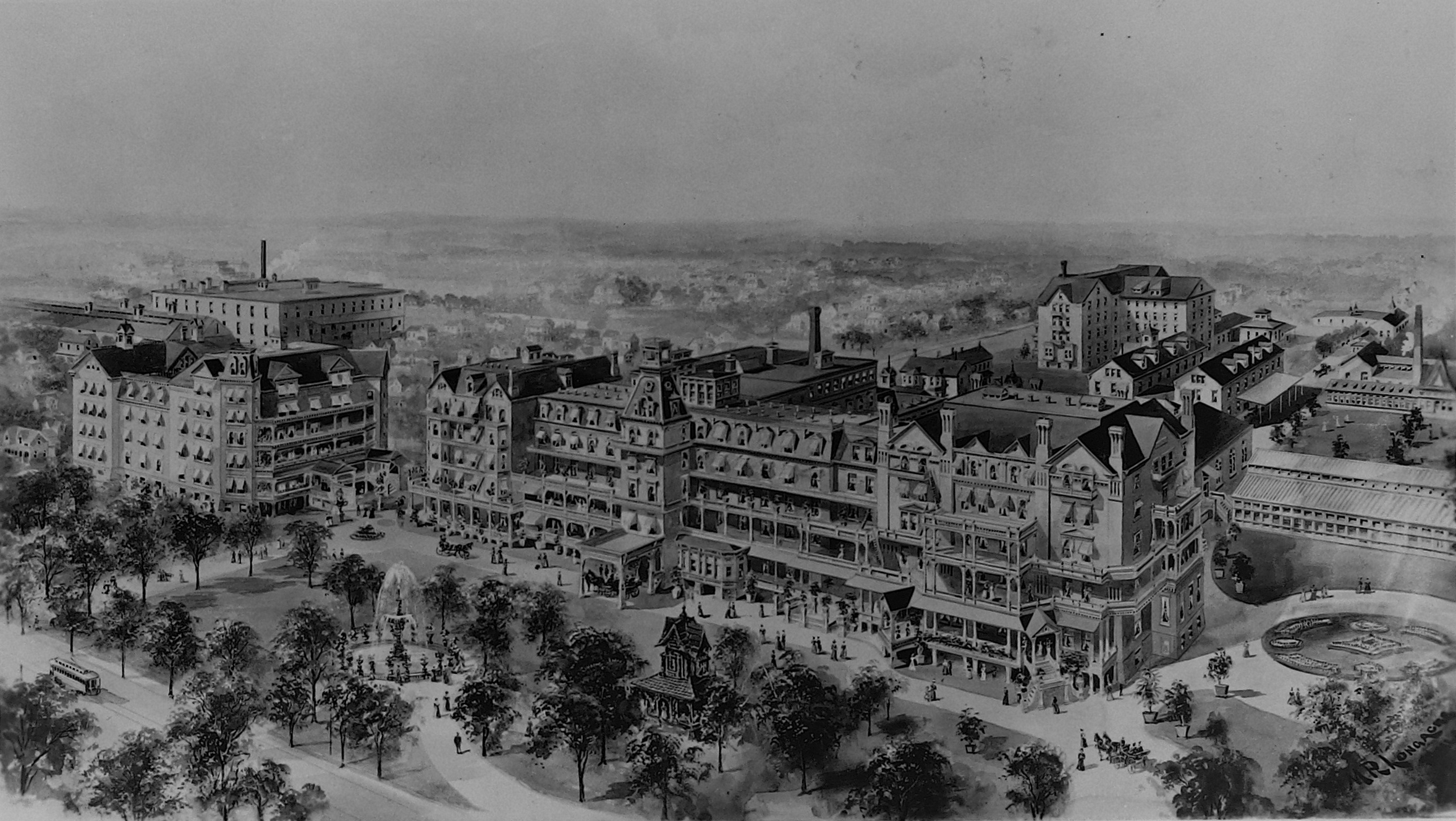
Battle Creek Medical Surgical Sanitarium before 1902

Kellogg hoped to become a teacher, and at age 16 taught a district school in Hastings, Michigan. By age 20, he had enrolled in a teacher's training course offered by Michigan State Normal School. The Kelloggs and the Whites, however, convinced him to join his half-brother Merritt, Edson White, William C. White, and Jennie Trembley, as students in a six-month medical course at Russell Trall's Hygieo-Therapeutic College in Florence Township, New Jersey. Their goal was to develop a group of trained doctors for the Adventist-inspired Western Health Reform Institute in Battle Creek. Under the Whites' patronage, John Harvey Kellogg went on to attend medical school at the University of Michigan and the Bellevue Hospital Medical College in New York City. He graduated in 1875 with a medical degree. In October 1876, Kellogg became director of the Western Health Reform Institute. In 1877, he renamed it the Battle Creek Medical Surgical Sanitarium, cleverly coining the term "sanitarium" to suggest both hospital care and the importance of sanitation and personal health. Kellogg would lead the institution until his death in 1943.

== Theological views ==
Kellogg was brought up in the Seventh-day Adventist Church from childhood. Selected as a protégé of the Whites and trained as a doctor, Kellogg held a prominent role as a speaker at church meetings. Throughout his lifetime, Kellogg experienced pressure from both science and religion regarding his theological views.

At the Seventeenth Annual Session of the General Conference of Seventh-day Adventists, October 4, 1878, the following action was taken:

WHEREAS, The impression has gone out from some unknown cause that J. H. Kellogg, M.D., holds infidel sentiments, which does him great injustice, and also endangers his influence as physician-in-chief of the Sanitarium; therefore

RESOLVED, That in our opinion justice to the doctor and the Institute under his medical charge, demand that he should have the privilege of making his sentiments known, and that he be invited to address those assembled on this ground, upon the harmony of science and the Sacred Scriptures.

This resolution was unanimously adopted, after which the Conference adjourned to the call of the chair.

[Note. – In accordance with the foregoing resolution, Dr. Kellogg gave, before a large audience, October 6, an able address on the harmony of science and the Bible, for which the congregation tendered him a vote of thanks.]

=== Theological modernism ===
Kellogg rejected Christian fundamentalism and promoted the tenets of theological modernism. He rejected many of the traditional tenets of Nicene Christianity, viewing the atonement of Jesus as "his exemplary life" on Earth rather than the Cross. Kellogg mocked the concepts of original sin and inherent human depravity, frequently joking that "the total depravity which we often hear talked about is, half the time at least, nothing more nor less than total indigestion". Historian Brian C. Wilson writes:

One of the most controversial aspects of Kellogg's developing theology ... was its decidedly non-Christocentric focus. While "God" is mentioned one hundred times, "Jesus Christ" is mentioned only briefly, twelve times, and is treated as something of a peripheral character.

=== Harmony of science and the Bible ===
Kellogg defended "the harmony of science and the Bible" throughout his career, but he was active at a transitional time, when both science and medicine were becoming increasingly secularized. White and others in the Adventist ministry worried that Kellogg's students and staff were in danger of losing their religious beliefs, while Kellogg felt that many ministers failed to recognize his expertise and the importance of his medical work. There were ongoing tensions between his authority as a doctor, and their authority as ministers. Nonetheless, Kellogg attempted to reconcile science and medicine with religion, rejecting their separation, and emphasizing the presence of God within God's creation of living things.

The heart is a muscle. The heart beats. My arm will contract and cause the fist to beat; but it beats only when my will commands. But here is a muscle in the body that beats when I am asleep. It beats when my will is inactive and I am utterly unconscious. It keeps on beating all the time. What will is it that causes this heart to beat? The heart can not beat once without a command. To me it is a most wonderful thing that a man's heart goes on beating. It does not beat by means of my will; for I can not stop the heart's beating, or make it beat faster or slower by commanding it by my will. But there is a will that controls the heart. It is the divine will that causes it to beat, and in the beating of that heart that you can feel, as you put your hand upon the breast, or as you put your finger against the pulse, an evidence of the divine presence that we have within us, that God is within, that there is an intelligence, a power, a will within, that is commanding the functions of our bodies and controlling them…

He further elaborated these ideas in his book The Living Temple (1903):

There is a clear, complete, satisfactory explanation of the most subtle, the most marvelous phenomena of nature, – namely, an infinite Intelligence working out its purposes. God is the explanation of nature, – not a God outside of nature, but in nature, manifesting himself through and in all the objects, movements, and varied phenomena of the universe. ... The tree does not create itself; a creative power is constantly going forward in it. Buds and leaves come forth from within the tree ... So there is present in the tree a power which creates and maintains it, a tree-maker in the tree, a flower-maker in the flower, – a divine architect who understands every law of proportion, an infinite artist who possesses a limitless power of expression in color and form; there is, in all the world about us, an infinite, divine, though invisible Presence, to which the unenlightened may be blind, but which is ever declaring itself by its ceaseless, beneficent activity.

At the same time that Kellogg defended the presence of God in nature against secularization, his co-religionists saw his descriptions of the presence of God in nature as evidence of panentheistic tendencies (Everything is in God). Kellogg rejected their religious criticisms, asserting that his views on indwelling divinity were simply a restatement of the omnipresence of God, and not pantheism.

=== Pantheism Crisis ===
His theological views went against many of the traditional tenets of Nicene Christianity. As Seventh-day Adventist beliefs shifted towards orthodox Trinitarianism during the 1890s, Adventists within the denominations were "unable to accommodate the essentially liberal understanding of Christianity" exhibited by Kellogg, viewing his theology as pantheistic and unorthodox. What came to be referred to as the "Pantheism Crisis" of 1903 was a pivotal moment in the church's history. Kellogg's theological views were only one of the issues involved: operation of the sanitarium was equally if not more important. Control of the sanitarium and its finances had been a source of contention for some time, especially as the institution expanded and attracted more affluent patients. Tensions came to a head when the Battle Creek Sanitarium, originally owned by the Seventh-day Adventist Church but run by Kellogg, was destroyed by fire on February 18, 1902. Although almost all of the guests escaped safely, property loss was estimated at $300,000 to $400,000, about twice the insured value.

Ellen G. White, who had proclaimed that a cleansing sword of fire was poised over the increasingly "worldly" and business-oriented Battle Creek, was against rebuilding the large institution. Although she apparently wrote a manuscript testifying against the rebuilding in 1902, it was not sent to Kellogg at that time, and Kellogg did not directly consult her about his plans. With support of the board of directors, he not only rebuilt the institution, but doubled its size. The new building was designed by architect Frank Mills Andrews of Ohio and opened on May 31, 1903. Designed to be fireproof, the new brick building was six stories high, with an elegant frontage extending 550 feet along Washington Avenue, and three wings opening out behind. It included, among other things, a solarium and palm court, and it cost more than $700,000.

=== Disfellowshipping ===
Kellogg used proceeds from his book The Living Temple to help pay the costs of reconstruction. The book's printing was opposed by a commission of the General Council of the Adventists after W. W. Prescott, one of the four members of the commission, argued that it was heretical. When Kellogg arranged to print it privately, the book went through its own trial by fire: on December 30, 1902, fire struck the Herald where the book was typeset and ready to print. When it finally appeared in 1903, the book was sharply criticized by White for what she considered its many statements of pantheism. Over the next few years, there was increasing conflict between Kellogg, General Conference President A. G. Daniells and others. In 1907, Kellogg was "disfellowshipped", as part of a schism that split the church. Kellogg retained control of the Battle Creek Sanitarium and the American Medical Missionary College, and continued to promote Adventist ideas of health and well-being at those institutions.

In later life, Kellogg spoke positively of Seventh-day Adventists and Ellen G. White's prophetic ministry, despite their struggles. In 1941, in response to critic E. S. Ballenger, Kellogg admonished Ballenger for his critical attitude to Mrs. White.

Mrs. White was unquestionably an inspired woman. In spite of this fact, she was human and made many mistakes and probably suffered more from those mistakes than any person ever did. Nevertheless, I knew the woman was sincere and honest and that the influence of her life was immensely helpful to a vast multitude of people, and I have not the slightest desire in any way to weaken in the smallest degree the good influence of her life and work.

== Battle Creek Sanitarium ==
Kellogg was a Seventh-day Adventist until mid-life, and gained fame while being the chief medical officer of the Battle Creek Sanitarium, which was owned and operated by the Seventh-day Adventist Church. The sanitarium was operated based on the church's health principles. Adventists believe in promoting a vegetarian diet, abstinence from alcohol and tobacco, and a regimen of exercise, all of which Kellogg followed. He is remembered as an advocate of vegetarianism and wrote in favor of it, even after leaving the Adventist Church. His dietary advice in the late 19th century discouraged meat-eating, but not emphatically so. His development of a bland diet was driven in part by the Adventist goal of reducing sexual stimulation.

Kellogg was an especially strong proponent of nuts, which he believed would save humanity in the face of decreasing food supplies. Though mainly renowned nowadays for his development of corn flakes, Kellogg also invented a process for making peanut butter and developed healthy "granose biscuits" which became popular as far away as Australia and England.

The Battle Creek Sanitarium had its own experimental kitchen. There, Ella Eaton Kellogg helped to develop vegetarian foods, and supervised a "school of cookery" which taught classes in food preparation for homemakers. She published a cookbook, Science in the Kitchen, containing hundreds of recipes along with discussions of nutrition and household and diet management. Some of its inventive vegetarian recipes use food products created at the sanitarium, such as Nuttolene (a meat pâté made from peanuts), Protose (a combination of nuts and grains), and various types of nut butters.

Kellogg believed that most disease is alleviated by a change in intestinal flora. He posited that bacteria in the intestines can either help or hinder the body; that pathogenic bacteria produce toxins during the digestion of protein which poison the blood; that a poor diet favors harmful bacteria that can then infect other tissues in the body; that the intestinal flora is changed by diet and is generally changed for the better by a well-balanced vegetarian diet favoring low-protein, laxative, and high-fiber foods. He recommended various regimens of specific foods designed to heal particular ailments.

Kellogg further believed that natural changes in intestinal flora could be sped by enemas seeded with favorable bacteria. He advocated the frequent use of an enema machine to cleanse the bowel with several gallons of water. Water enemas were followed by the administration of a pint of yogurt – half was eaten, the other half was administered by enema, "thus planting the protective germs where they are most needed and may render most effective service." The yogurt served to replace the intestinal flora of the bowel, creating what Kellogg claimed was a squeaky-clean intestine.

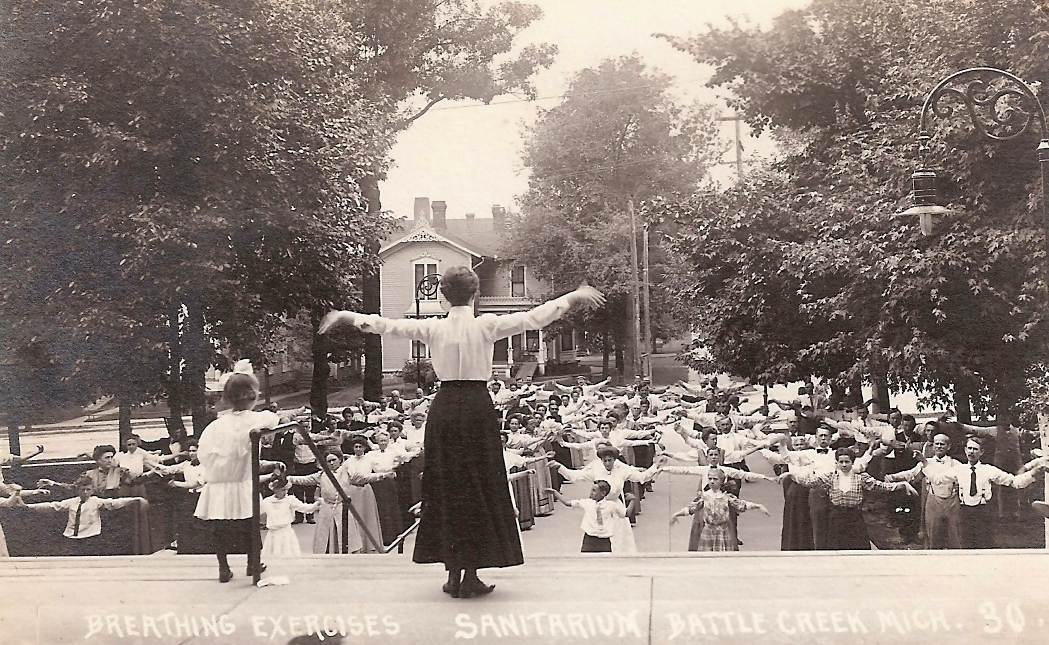
Breathing exercises at Battle Creek Sanitarium (c. 1900)

Sanitarium visitors also engaged in breathing exercises and mealtime marches, to promote proper digestion of food throughout the day. Because Kellogg was a staunch supporter of phototherapy, the sanitarium made use of artificial sunbaths. Kellogg was a skilled surgeon, who often donated his services to indigent patients at his clinic.

He had many notable patients, such as former president William Howard Taft, composer and pianist Percy Grainger, arctic explorers Vilhjalmur Stefansson and Roald Amundsen, world travellers Richard Halliburton and Lowell Thomas, aviator Amelia Earhart, economist Irving Fisher, Nobel prize winning playwright George Bernard Shaw, actor and athlete Johnny Weissmuller, founder of the Ford Motor Company Henry Ford, inventor Thomas Edison, African-American activist Sojourner Truth, and actress Sarah Bernhardt.

== Patents and inventions ==
=== Foods ===
John Harvey Kellogg developed and marketed a wide variety of vegetarian foods. Many of them were meant to be suitable for an invalid diet, and were intentionally made easy to chew and to digest. Starchy foods such as grains were ground and baked, to promote the conversion of starch into dextrin. Nuts were ground and boiled or steamed.

The foods Kellogg developed also tended to be bland. In this, Kellogg followed the teachings of Ellen G. White and Sylvester Graham who recommended a diet of bland foods to minimize excitement, sexual arousal, and masturbation.

==== Breakfast cereals ====
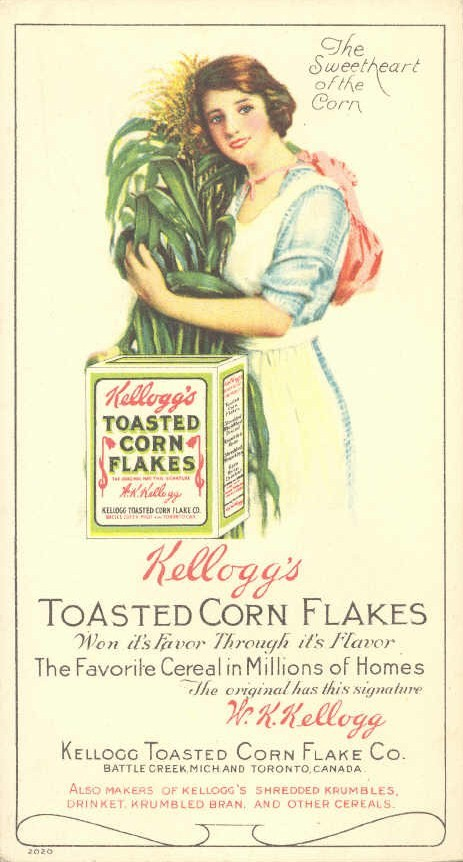
Early Kellogg's Corn Flakes advertisement

Around 1877, John H. Kellogg began experimenting to produce a softer breakfast food, something easy to chew. He developed a dough that was a mixture of wheat, oats, and corn. It was baked at high temperatures for a long period of time, to break down or "dextrinize" starch molecules in the grain. After it cooled, Kellogg broke the bread into crumbs. The cereal was originally marketed under the name "Granula" but this led to legal problems with James Caleb Jackson who already sold a wheat cereal under that name. In 1881, under threat of a lawsuit by Jackson, Kellogg changed the sanitarium cereal's name to "Granola". It was used initially by patients at the sanitarium, but slowly began to build up a following among former patients. In 1890, John formed the Sanitas Food Company to develop and market food products.

The Kelloggs are best known for the invention of the famous breakfast cereal corn flakes. The development of the flaked cereal in 1894 has been variously described by those involved: Ella Eaton Kellogg, John Harvey Kellogg, his younger brother Will Keith Kellogg, and other family members. There is considerable disagreement over who was involved in the discovery, and the role that they played. According to some accounts, Ella suggested rolling out the dough into thin sheets, and John developed a set of rollers for the purpose. According to others, John had the idea in a dream, and used equipment in his wife's kitchen to do the rolling. It is generally agreed that upon being called out one night, John Kellogg left a batch of wheat-berry dough behind. Rather than throwing it out the next morning, he sent it through the rollers and was surprised to obtain delicate flakes, which could then be baked. Will Kellogg was tasked with figuring out what had happened, and recreating the process reliably. Ella and Will were often at odds, and their versions of the story tend to minimize or deny each other's involvement, while emphasizing their own part in the discovery. The process that Kellogg had discovered, tempering, was to be a fundamental technique of the flaked cereal industry.

A patent for "Flaked Cereals and Process of Preparing Same" was filed on May 31, 1895, and issued on April 14, 1896, to John Harvey Kellogg as Patent No. 558,393. Significantly, the patent applied to a variety of types of grains, not just to wheat. John Harvey Kellogg was the only person named on the patent. Will later insisted that he, not Ella, had worked with John, and repeatedly asserted that he should have received more credit than he was given for the discovery of the flaked cereal.

During their first year of production, the Kelloggs sold tens of thousands of pounds of flaked cereal, marketing it as "Granose". They continued to experiment using rice and corn as well as wheat, and in 1898 released the first batch of Sanitas Toasted Corn Flakes. A modified version with a longer shelf life was released in 1902. By that time, both "Granose Biscuits" and "Granose Flakes" were available.

Will Kellogg continued to develop and market flaked cereal. When he proposed adding sugar to the flakes, John would not agree to the change. So, in 1906, Will started his own company, the Battle Creek Toasted Corn Flake Company. This marked the start of a decades-long feud between the brothers. Will's Battle Creek Toasted Corn Flake Company eventually became the Kellogg Company, while John was denied the right to use the Kellogg name for his cereals.

They had other competitors as well, including C. W. Post. Post was treated at the Battle Creek Sanitarium between February 6 and November 9, 1891, and later by Christian Scientists whom he credited with his successful treatment. He settled in Battle Creek, opened his own sanitarium, the LaVita Inn, in March 1892, and founded his own dry foods company, Post Holdings. Post started selling Postum coffee substitute in 1895. He issued Grape-Nuts breakfast cereal, a mixture of yeast, barley and wheat, in January 1898. In January 1906, Post introduced "Elijah's Manna", later renaming it Post Toasties Double-Crisp Corn Flakes, and marketing it as a direct competitor to Kellogg's Corn Flakes.

John Harvey Kellogg was inducted into the National Inventors Hall of Fame in 2006 for the discovery of tempering and the invention of the first dry flaked breakfast cereal, which "transformed the typical American breakfast".

==== Peanut butter ====
John H. Kellogg is one of several people who have been credited with the invention of peanut butter. Rose Davis of Alligerville, New York has been reported to have made a peanut spread as early as 1840, after her son described Cuban women grinding peanuts and eating the paste on bread. In 1884, Marcellus Gilmore Edson (1849–1940) of Montreal, Canada obtained a patent for the "Manufacture of peanut-candy", combining 1 part of a "flavoring paste" made from roasted peanuts with 7 parts of sugar. By 1894, George A. Bayle of St. Louis was selling a "Cheese Nut" snack food containing peanuts and cheese; a peanut-only version was apparently more successful. George Washington Carver is often credited because of his scientific work with peanuts and promotion of their use. Carver and Kellogg corresponded in the 1920s and 1930s about the use of both peanuts and sweet potatoes.

Some form of nut butter, likely made with peanuts, was served to patients at the Battle Creek Sanitarium before October 1895, when Kellogg wrote to Ellen White that "some very excellent preparations from nuts" had entirely replaced butter. Kellogg did not patent peanut butter explicitly, and later stated that this was intentional: "Let everybody that wants it have it, and make the best use of it". Kellogg did, however, apply for two patents relating to "nut butters" in 1895, before anyone else did so.

On November 4, 1895, John H. Kellogg applied for two patents that are relevant to the production of peanut butter. Patent No. 567901, granted September 15, 1896, was for a "Food Compound" which produced "an improved article of manufacture, the alimentary product composed of completely digested starch, completely-emulsified vegetable oil such as described, and thoroughly cooked and finely-divided vegetable proteins derived from nuts, as specified." The process described involved taking raw edible nuts, preferably peanuts or almonds, blanching them to remove their skins, and then boiling them for several hours. The nuts were then crushed and passed through rollers to separate out "a fine and comparatively dry and nearly white nutmeal" and a "moist, pasty, adhesive, and brown" butter or paste.

The second patent, No. 604493, granted on May 24, 1898, was for a "Process of Producing Alimentary Products" from "edible nuts, preferably peanuts". The process for making the paste again involved boiling the peanuts, but noted that roasting was a possible alternative. The final substance was heated in sealed cans to obtain "a product differing in many ways from the original paste" with a consistency resembling cheese.

By 1898, the Kelloggs were marketing a wide variety of nut-based foods through the Sanitas Nut Food Company. Kellogg marketed nut butters as a nutritious protein substitute for people who had difficulty chewing on solid food. Because peanuts were the least expensive nut available, they rapidly dominated the nut butter market.

Joseph Lambert, who had worked for Kellogg at the sanitarium, began selling a hand-operated peanut butter grinder in 1896. In 1899, his wife Almeda Lambert published a Guide for Nut Cookery.

==== Meat substitutes ====
Kellogg credited his interest in meat substitutes to Charles William Dabney, an agricultural chemist and the Assistant Secretary of Agriculture. Dabney wrote to Kellogg on the subject around 1895.

In 1896, Kellogg introduced but did not patent "Nuttose", the first commercially produced alternative to meat. Nuttose was made primarily from peanuts and resembled "cold roast mutton". By seasoning or marinating, Nuttose could be made to taste like fried chicken or barbeque. Served with mashed potatoes and vegetables, it could mimic a traditional American meal.

On March 19, 1901, Kellogg was granted the first United States Patent for a "vegetable substitute for meat", for a blend of nuts and grain cereals called "Protose". In applying for US patent 670283A, John Harvey Kellogg, "Vegetable-food Compound", issued June 8, 1899, Kellogg described Protose as a product "which shall possess equal or greater nutritive value in equal or more available form ... By proper regulation of the temperature and proportions of the ingredients, various meat-like flavors are developed, which give the finished product very characteristic properties." Nuttose and Protose were the first of many meat alternatives.

==== Other foods ====
In addition to developing imitation meats variously made from nuts, grains, and soy, Kellogg also developed the first acidophilus soy milk, which was patented in 1934. Kellogg advocated that it be administered to bottle-fed babies, to improve their intestinal fauna and combat bowel infections. Perhaps his most famous patients were the Dionne quintuplets. When he learned that Marie had a bowel infection, Kellogg sent a case of his soy acidophilus to their doctor, Allan Roy Dafoe. When Marie's infection cleared up, Dafoe requested that Kellogg send an ongoing supply for the quintuplets. By 1937, each one consumed at least a pint per day. Another famous patient who benefited from soy acidophilus was polar explorer Richard E. Byrd. Kellogg also sold yogurt, soy flour, and soy bread.

=== Medical patents ===
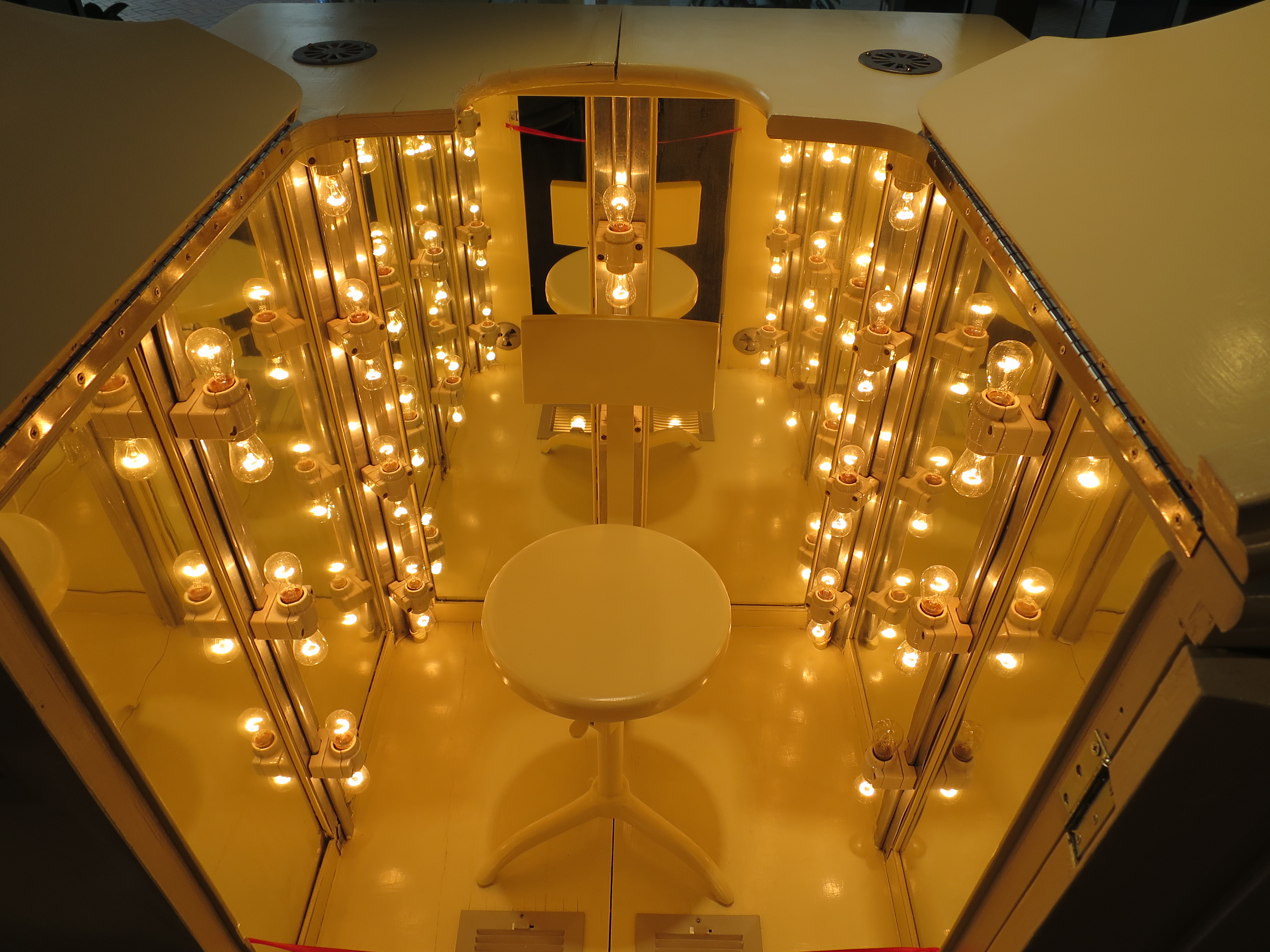
Radiant heat bath by John H. Kellogg at the USPTO museum, patent no. 558,394; patented April 14, 1896

- US patent 558394, John Harvey Kellogg, "Radiant-heat bath", issued April 14, 1896
- US patent 835622, John Harvey Kellogg, "Movement-cure apparatus", issued April 13, 1906
- US patent 850938, John Harvey Kellogg, "Exercising apparatus", issued April 23, 1907
- US patent 881321, John Harvey Kellogg, "Massage apparatus", issued March 10, 1908

=== Medical inventions ===
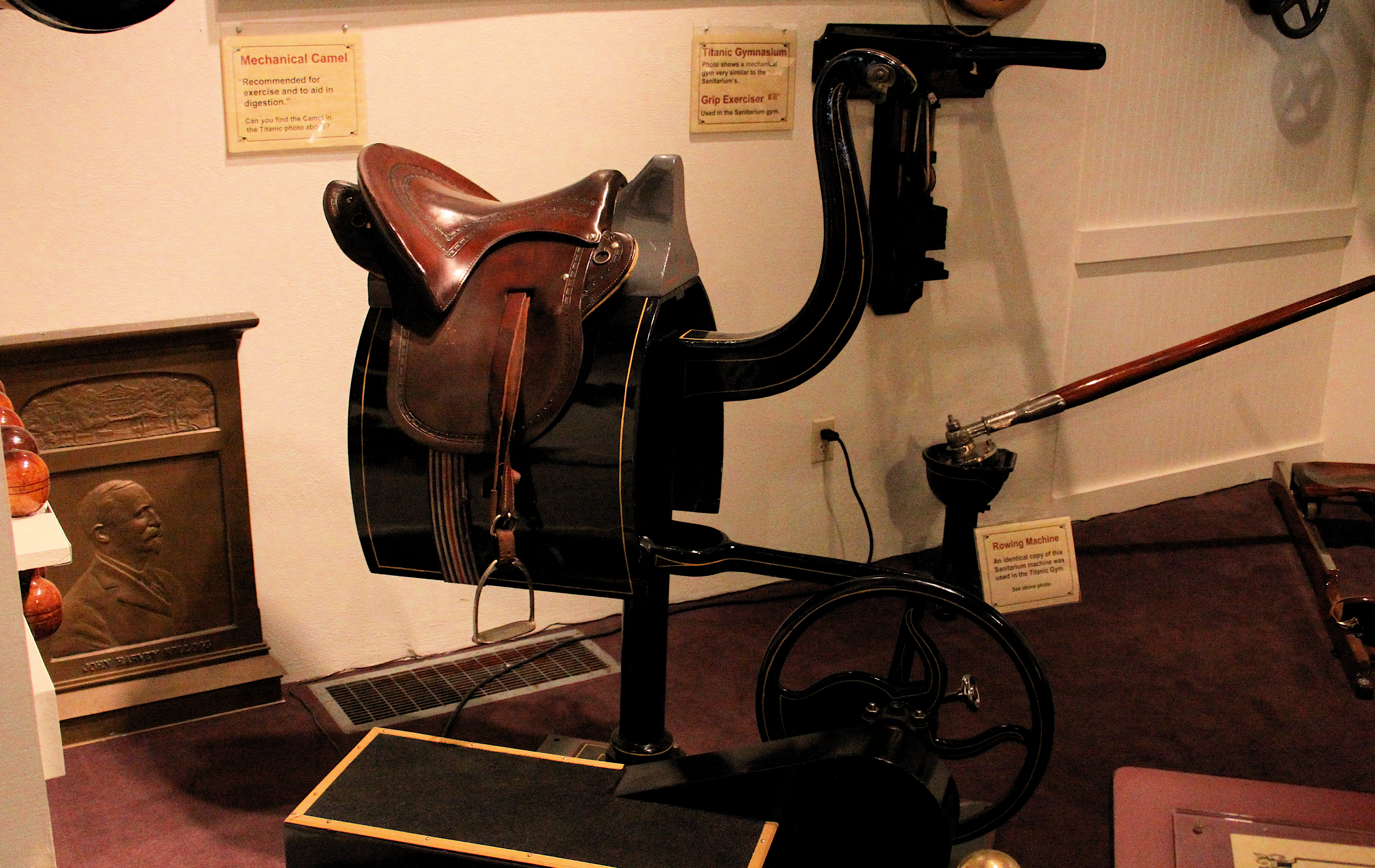
Mechanical Camel designed by John Harvey Kellogg

Although they are less discussed than his food creations, Kellogg designed and improved upon a number of medical devices that were regularly used at the Battle Creek Sanitarium in surgical operations and in treatment modalities falling under the term "physiotherapy". Many of the machines invented by Kellogg were manufactured by the Battle Creek Sanitarium Equipment Company, which was established in 1890. Dr. Kellogg attempted to popularize these treatment methods, including electrotherapy, hydrotherapy, and motor therapy, in his work The Home Handbook of Domestic Hygiene and Rational Medicine, first published in 1881.

As he specialized in certain gynecological surgeries (particularly hemorrhoidectomies and ovariotomies) and gastrointestinal surgeries, he developed various instruments for these operations. These included specialized hooks and retractors, a heated operating table, and an aseptic drainage tube used in abdominal surgery.

Additionally, Kellogg took keen interest in devising instruments for light therapy, mechanical exercising, proper breathing, and hydrotherapy. His medical inventions spanned a wide range of applications and included a hot air bath, vibrating chair, oscillomanipulator, window tent for fresh air, pneumograph to graphically represent respiratory habits, loofah mitt, and an apparatus for home sterilization of milk. Some of his inventions were fashionable enough to be included in the first class gymnasium of the RMS Titanic.

Kellogg did not make concerted efforts to profit from his medical inventions. Kellogg's statement in 1916 about his food company sheds light on his general motivations: "I desire to make clear ... that the food business I have been carrying on is a part of my general scheme to propagate the ideas of health and biological living. Otherwise, I should not have engaged in it as a commercial enterprise, but I have carried it on as a part of the general philanthropic work in which I was engaged."

==== Phototherapeutic inventions ====
Partly motivated by the overcast skies of Michigan winters, Kellogg experimented with and worked to develop light therapies, as he believed in the value of the electric light bulb to provide heat penetration for treating bodily disorders.

He constructed his first incandescent light bath in 1891, claiming to treat thousands of patients at the Battle Creek Sanitarium before exhibiting the bath at the World's Columbian Exposition in Chicago in 1893. The invention reportedly aroused little attention there but was brought back to Germany, where it began to be manufactured and sold. It was spread to Vienna by Kellogg's friend Dr. Wilhelm Winternitz; installed in royal palaces across Europe; and popularly replaced old Turkish steam baths at athletic clubs. Only after cabinet baths became popular in Europe did demand within the United States develop. It was imported from Berlin to New York "as a therapeutic novelty". In 1896, Kellogg patented the radiant-heat bath in the United States (US558394).

In order "to make a record of his work and experience as a pioneer in this branch of physiotherapeutics", Kellogg published his book Light Therapeutics: a practical manual of phototherapy for the student and the practitioner, with special reference to the incandescent electric-light bath in 1910. In the short work, Kellogg describes the application of the arc light to the spine, chest, abdominal region, loins, shoulders, hip and thigh, knees and other joints. He also goes into detail about combining electrotherapies with hydrotherapies, e.g. the electric light bath with shower and shampoo.

==== Electrotherapeutic inventions ====
Though Kellogg stated that "electricity is not capable of accomplishing half the marvels that are claimed for it by many enthusiastic electrotherapists," he still believed electric currents to be "an extremely valuable therapeutic agent, especially when utilized in connection with hydrotherapy, thermotherapy, and other physiologic methods." As a result, electrotherapy coils were used in the Static Electrical Department of the Battle Creek Sanitarium especially for cases of paresthesias of neurasthenia, insomnia, and certain forms of neuralgia. Devices were also used to administer electric shocks to various parts of a patient's body.

Vibrational therapy by way of sinusoidal (high-frequency oscillating) electric current was discovered by Kellogg in 1884 to have medical use for increasing blood circulation and passive exercise. In particular, Kellogg invented a vibrating chair used to stimulate vital organs in the lower abdomen. Even today one can visit the Kellogg Discovery Center in Battle Creek, Michigan, and sit on Kellogg's vibrating chair, which is equipped to mechanically oscillate 20 times per second. Furthermore, Kellogg devised an electrotherapy exercise bed in which a sinusoidal current that produced muscular contraction could be delivered without pain for twenty minutes and reportedly achieve the stimulation of a brisk four-mile walk.

==== Mechanical massage devices ====
Massage devices included two- or four-person foot vibrators, a mechanical slapping massage device, and a kneading apparatus that was advertised in 1909 to sell for $150.00 (equivalent to about $5,400 in 2025). Kellogg advocated mechanical massage, a branch of mechanotherapy, for cases of anemia, general debility, and muscular or nervous weakness.

==== Irrigator ====
In 1936, Kellogg filed a petition for his invention of improvements to an "irrigating apparatus particularly adaptable for colonic irrigating, but susceptible of use for other irrigation treatments." The improved irrigator included features such as measuring the amount of liquid entering and exiting the colon as well as indicating and regulating the positive pressure of the pumped liquid.

At the Battle Creek Sanitarium, these colonic irrigators were often used to shoot gallons of water up patients' rectums into their colons, sometimes followed by a half-pint yogurt enema to aid in further cleaning. It has been suggested that multiple people would get this treatment at one time.

== Views on health ==
=== Biologic living ===
Synthesizing his Adventist beliefs with his scientific and medical knowledge, Kellogg created his idea of "biologic living". This was the idea that appropriate diet, exercise, and recreation was required to maintain a healthy body, mind, and soul. As such, the policies and therapies at the Battle Creek Sanitarium were very much in line with these principles of biologic living, such as the focus on vegetarianism or drinking 8–10 glasses of water a day. In fact, his belief that biologic living would protect his health was so strong that he did not even feel it necessary to get vaccinated against smallpox.

Kellogg's philosophy was presented in seven textbooks that were prepared for Adventist schools and colleges. In these, Kellogg put his main emphasis on the value of fresh air, exercise, and sunshine, and the dangers of alcohol and tobacco. In terms of practice, Kellogg's biologic living was very similar to the methods of Christian physiologists, requiring sexual restraint, total abstinence from drugs, and a vegetarian diet.

=== Views on tobacco ===
Kellogg was a prominent member of the anti-tobacco consumption campaign, speaking out often on the issue. He believed that consumption of tobacco not only caused physiological damage, but also pathological, nutritional, moral, and economic devastation onto society. His belief was that "tobacco has not a single redeeming feature… and is one of the most deadly of all the many poisonous plants known to the botanist." His beliefs were very much in line with the prevailing view of the Adventists, who had become some of the most important supporters of the anti-tobacco movement.

In his 1922 book Tobaccoism, or How Tobacco Kills, Kellogg cited many studies on the negative impacts of smoking, and went so far as to attribute the longer lifespan of women to the observation that they partook in tobacco less than their male counterparts.

Kellogg also served as the president of the Michigan Anti-Cigarette Society, and after the First World War, he served as a member of the Committee of Fifty to Study the Tobacco Problem. This latter group included Henry Ford, George Peabody, and John Burroughs, and ended with the production of one of the first educational motion pictures against smoking. Kellogg's work on several committees against smoking culminated in Utah Senator Reed Smoot introducing a bill to Congress in 1929 that aimed to put tobacco under the purview of the Pure Food and Drug Act. In the end, however, this measure failed to pass.

=== Views on alcohol and other beverages ===
Though alcoholic beverages were commonly used as a stimulant by the medical community during the time that Kellogg began his medical practice, he was firm in his opposition to the practice. The usage of alcohol as a remedy to anything was "an evil of stupendous proportions."

Kellogg went against the prevailing notion of the time that alcohol was a stimulant. Citing contemporary research, Kellogg believed that alcohol could not be a stimulant because it lessened vital activity and depressed vital forces. Seeing its effects on plants, animals, and humans, he felt that alcohol was a poison. Kellogg noticed deleterious effects that alcohol had on both the brain, the digestive system, and the liver, among other organs.

In addition to the idea that alcohol was an unsuitable therapeutic tool, Kellogg also considered it to lead to mental and moral bankruptcy. Alcohol was "one of the devil's most efficient agents for destroying the happiness of man, both for the present and the hereafter." Even moderate drinkers were subject to these effects, as Kellogg felt that a poison was a poison in all doses.

Kellogg also opposed tea and coffee due to the caffeine content of those beverages. His view was that caffeine was a poison. Not only did he detail numerous physiological and developmental problems caused by caffeine, but he also suggested that caffeine usage could lead to moral deficiencies. He blamed the prevalence of these beverages not only on the prohibition of alcoholic beverages at the time, but also on the extensive marketing efforts organized by the producers of these products. Kellogg's view was that "nature has supplied us with pure water, with a great variety of fruit juices and wholesome and harmless flavors quite sufficient to meet all our needs."

As early as the 1880s, Kellogg had prepared charts and lectures on the dangers of tobacco and alcohol, which were used widely by lecturers who encouraged temperance in their students. In 1878, John Harvey Kellogg, along with Ellen G. White, the founder of the Seventh-day Adventists, and several others, had organized the American Health and Temperance Association. The goal of this organization was to expose the far-reaching dangers of tobacco, alcohol, tea, and coffee. For the 15 years that the organization persisted, Kellogg remained as its president.

== Hydropathy ==
=== Properties of water ===
Kellogg has labeled the various uses of hydropathy as being byproducts of the many properties of water. In his 1876 book, The Uses of Water in Health & Disease, he acknowledges both the chemical composition and physical properties of water. Hydrogen and oxygen, when separate, are two "colorless, transparent, and tasteless" gases, which are explosive when mixed. More importantly, water, he says, has the highest specific heat of any compound (although in actuality it does not). As such, the amount of heat and energy needed to elevate the temperature of water is significantly higher than that of other compounds like mercury. Kellogg addressed water's ability to absorb massive amounts of energies when shifting phases. He also highlighted water's most useful property, its ability to dissolve many other substances.

=== Remedial properties of water ===
According to Kellogg, water provides remedial properties partly because of vital resistance and partly because of its physical properties. For Kellogg, the medical uses of water begin with its function as a refrigerant, a way to lower body heat by way of dissipating its production as well as by conduction. "There is not a drug in the whole materia medica that will diminish the temperature of the body so readily and so efficiently as water." Water can also serve as a sedative. While other substances serve as sedatives by exerting their poisonous influences on the heart and nerves, water is a gentler and more efficient sedative without any of the negative side-effects seen in these other substances. Kellogg states that a cold bath can often reduce one's pulse by 20 to 40 beats per minute quickly, in a matter of a few minutes. Additionally, water can function as a tonic, increasing both the speed of circulation and the overall temperature of the body. A hot bath accelerates one's pulse from 70 to 150 beats per minute in 15 minutes. Water is also useful as an anodyne since it can lower nervous sensibility and reduce pain when applied in the form of hot fomentation. Kellogg argues that this procedure will often give one relief where every other drug has failed to do so. He also believed that no other treatment could function as well as an antispasmodic, reducing infantile convulsions and cramps, as water. Water can be an effective astringent as, when applied cold, it can arrest hemorrhages. Moreover, it can be very effective in producing bowel movements. Whereas purgatives would introduce "violent and unpleasant symptoms", water would not. Although it would not have much competition as an emetic at the time, Kellogg believed that no other substance could induce vomiting as well as water did. Returning to one of Kellogg's most admired qualities of water, it can function as a "most perfect eliminative". Water can dissolve waste and foreign matter from the blood. These many uses of water led Kellogg to believe that "the aim of the faithful physician should be to accomplish for his patient the greatest amount of good at the least expence of vitality; and it is an indisputable fact that in a large number of cases water is just the agent with which this desirable end can be obtained."

=== Incorrect uses of the water cure ===
Although Kellogg praised hydropathy for its many uses, he did acknowledge its limits. "In nearly all cases, sunlight, pure air, rest, exercise, proper food, and other hygienic agencies are quite as important as water. Electricity, too, is a remedy which should not be ignored; and skillful surgery is absolutely indispensable in not a small number of cases." With this belief, he went on to criticize many medical figures who misused or overestimated hydropathy in the treating of disease. Among these, he criticized what he referred to as "Cold-Water Doctors" who would recommend the same remedy regardless of the type of ailment or temperament of the patient. These doctors would prescribe ice-cold baths in unwarmed rooms even during the harshest winters. In his opinion, this prejudicial approach to illness resulted in converting hydropathy to a more heroic type of treatment where many became obsessed with taking baths in ice-cold water. He addresses the negative consequences that resulted from this "infatuation", among them tuberculosis and other diseases. This dangerous habit was only exacerbated by physicians who used hydropathy in excess. Kellogg recounts an instance where a patient with a low typhus fever was treated with 35 cold packs while in a feeble state and, not to the surprise of Kellogg, died. Kellogg posits this excessive and dangerous use of hydropathy as a return to the "violent processes" of bloodletting, antimony, mercury and purgatives. Kellogg also criticizes the ignorance in "Hydropathic Quacks" as well as in Preissnitz, the founder of modern hydropathy, himself. Kellogg states that the "Quacks" as well as Preissnitz are ignorant for overestimating the hydropathy as a "cure-all" remedy without understanding the true nature of disease.

== Later life ==
Kellogg would live for over 60 years after writing Plain Facts. He continued to work on healthy eating advice and run the sanitarium, although this was hit by the Great Depression and had to be sold. He ran another institute in Florida, which was popular throughout the rest of his life, although it was a distinct step down from his Battle Creek institute.

In 1937, Kellogg received an honorary degree as a Doctor of Public Service from Oglethorpe University.

Pulitzer Prize-winning historian Will Durant, who had been a vegetarian since the age of 18, called Dr. Kellogg "his old mentor", and said that Dr. Kellogg, more than any other person since his high school days, had influenced his life.

=== Good Health journal ===
Kellogg became editor of the Health Reformer journal in 1874. The journal changed its name to Good Health in 1879 and Kellogg held his editorial position for many years until his death. The Good Health journal had more than 20,000 subscribers and was published until 1955.

=== Race Betterment Foundation ===
Kellogg was outspoken about his views on race and his belief in racial segregation, regardless of the fact that he himself raised several black foster children. In 1906, together with Irving Fisher and Charles Davenport, Kellogg founded the Race Betterment Foundation, which became a major center of the new eugenics movement in America. Kellogg was in favor of racial segregation in the United States and he also believed that immigrants and non-whites would damage the white American population's gene pool.

He co-founded the Race Betterment Foundation, co-organized several National Conferences on Race Betterment and attempted to create a 'eugenics registry'. Alongside discouraging 'racial mixing', Kellogg was in favor of sterilizing 'mentally defective persons', promoting a eugenics agenda while working on the Michigan Board of Health and helping to enact authorization to sterilize those deemed 'mentally defective' into state laws during his tenure.

=== Late relationship with Will Keith Kellogg ===
Kellogg had a long personal and business split with his brother, after fighting in court for the rights to cereal recipes. The Foundation for Economic Education records that the nonagenarian J.H. Kellogg prepared a letter seeking to reopen the relationship. His secretary decided her employer had demeaned himself in it and refused to send it. The younger Kellogg did not see it until after his brother's death.

== Personal life ==
John Harvey Kellogg married Ella Ervilla Eaton of Alfred Center, New York, on February 22, 1879. The couple maintained separate bedrooms and did not have any biological children. However, they were foster parents to 42 children, legally adopting 8 of them, before Ella died in 1920. The adopted children included Agnes Grace, Elizabeth Ella, Harriett Eleanor, John William, Ivaline Maud, Paul Alfred, Robert Mofatt, and Newell Carey.

== Death ==
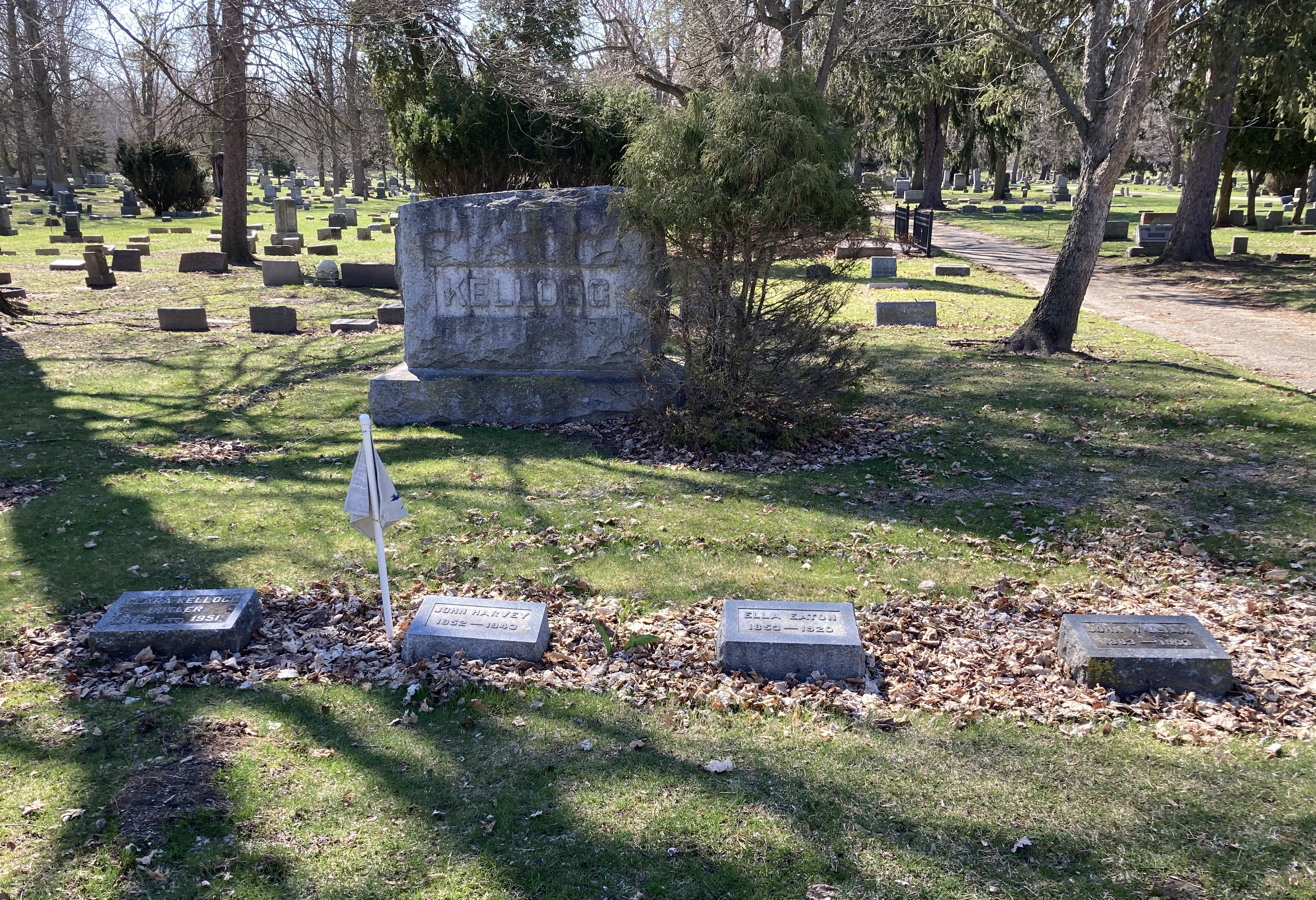
Kellogg's grave (second from left) at Oak Hill Cemetery

Kellogg died on December 14, 1943, in Battle Creek, Michigan. He was buried in Oak Hill Cemetery in Battle Creek. In his will, Kellogg left his entire estate to the Race Betterment Foundation.

== In popular culture ==
British actor Anthony Hopkins plays a highly fictionalized Dr. J.H. Kellogg in the American 1994 film The Road to Wellville by Alan Parker. This film depicts the fire of the sanitarium building complex, and ends with Dr. Kellogg, years after, dying of a heart attack while diving from a high board.

=== Misconceptions ===
Several popular misconceptions falsely attribute various cultural practices, inventions, and historical events to Kellogg. Common misconception credits Kellogg with starting and popularizing routine infant circumcision in the United States and the broader Anglosphere. Although he did advocate circumcision, without anesthetic, as an efficacious cure for masturbation, Kellogg's early views on circumcision did not instigate the adoption of the practice, as Lewis Sayre had already introduced the practice as a cure for a range of illnesses in the United States in 1870. In early editions of Plain facts for old and young, Kellogg wrote:

"A remedy which is almost always successful in small boys is circumcision, especially when there is any degree of phimosis. The operation should be performed by a surgeon without administering an anaesthetic, as the brief pain attending the operation will have a salutary effect upon the mind, especially if it be connected with the idea of punishment, as it may well be in some cases. The soreness which continues for several weeks interrupts the practice, and if it had not previously become too firmly fixed, it may be forgotten and not resumed."

Importantly, in later editions, Kellogg softened his tone, noting that, while aiding in maintaining cleanliness, the procedure also caused harms, citing iatrogenically created meatal stenosis among the Jewish male population:

Eminent physicians have expressed the opinion that the practice would be a salutary one for all men ... It is doubtful, however, whether as much harm as good does not result from circumcision, since it has been shown by extensive observation among the Jews that very great contraction of the meatus, or external orifice of the urethra, is exceedingly common among them, being undoubtedly the result of the prolonged irritation and subsequent cicatricial contraction resulting from circumcision in infancy.

== See also ==
- Eugenics in the United States
- Sylvester Graham

== Selected publications ==
- 1877 Plain Facts for Old and Young. "Self Abuse ... After having duly considered the causes and effects of this terrible evil, the question next in order for consideration is, How shall it be cured? When a person has, through ignorance or weakness, brought upon himself the terrible effects described, how shall he find relief from his ills, if restoration is possible? To the answer of these inquiries, most of the remaining pages of this work will be devoted. But before entering upon a description of methods of cure, a brief consideration of the subject of prevention of the habit will be in order."
- 1888 Treatment for Self-Abuse and Its Effects.
- 1893 Ladies Guide in Health and Disease
- 1880, 1886, 1899 The Home Hand-Book of Domestic Hygiene and Rational Medicine
- 1903 Rational Hydrotherapy
- 1910 Light Therapeutics
- 1914 Needed – A New Human Race Official Proceedings: Vol. I, Proceedings of the First National Conference on Race Betterment. Battle Creek, MI: Race Betterment Foundation, 431–450.
- 1915 "Health and Efficiency" Macmillan M. V. O'Shea and J. H. Kellogg (The Health Series of Physiology and Hygiene)
- 1915 The Eugenics Registry Official Proceedings: Vol II, Proceedings of the Second National Conference on Race Betterment. Battle Creek, MI: Race Betterment Foundation.
- 1918 "The Itinerary of a Breakfast" Funk & Wagnalls Company: New York and London
- 1922 Autointoxication or Intestinal Toxemia
- 1923 Tobaccoism or How Tobacco Kills
- 1923 The Natural Diet of Man
- 1927 New Dietetics: A Guide to Scientific Feeding in Health and Disease
- 1929 Art of Massage: A Practical Manual for the Nurse, the Student and the Practitioner
