= Phelps Sanitarium =

Demolished hospital

- Battle Creek Sanitarium
- Formerly listed on the U.S. National Register of Historic Places
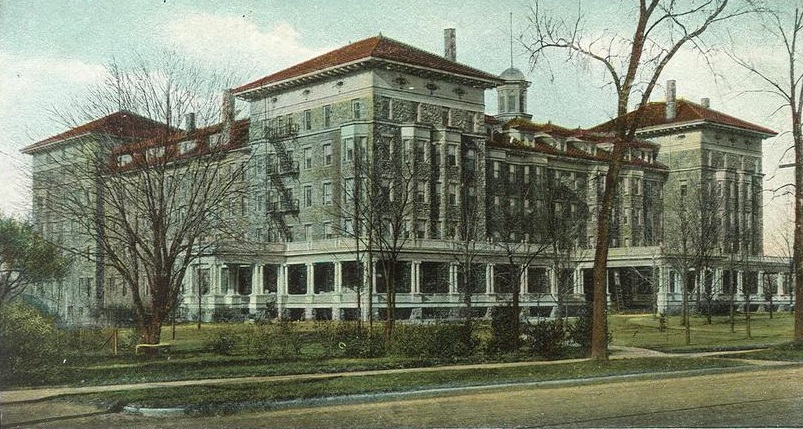
- Battle Creek Sanitarium headquarters, c. 1951

- Location within Michigan Location within the United States
- Interactive map
- Location: 197 N. Washington Ave., Battle Creek, Michigan
- Coordinates: 42°19′37″N 85°11′11″W
- Built: 1899
- Architect: Robert T. Newberry
- Demolished: 1985
- NRHP reference No.: 78001492

Significant dates
- Added to NRHP: October 4, 1978
- Removed from NRHP: April 18, 1988

The Phelps Sanitarium, later known as the Battle Creek Sanitarium, was a health care facility located at 197 N. Washington Avenue in Battle Creek, Michigan. The building was demolished in 1985.

== History ==
The Phelps Sanitarium was built by brothers O.S. and Neil S. Phelps, with construction beginning in 1899 and completed in 1900. The sanitarium was intended to compete with the nearby Battle Creek Sanitarium operated by Dr. John Harvey Kellogg. However, the Phelps brothers went bankrupt within four years, and in 1904 the building was sold to C. W. Post, who used it to house his Trades and Workers Association labor union. In 1906, Bernarr MacFadden opened his own sanatorium in the building, which lasted only until 1909.

In 1913, Dr. Kellogg purchased the building and used the building as a Sanitarium Annex. In 1942, the original Battle Creek Sanitarium building was sold to the federal government to become Percy Jones Army Hospital, and Kellogg's sanatorium moved into the former Phelps Sanitarium building. In 1957, the building was purchased by the Seventh-day Adventist Church. They operated the sanatorium for some time, constructing an annex in 1970. However, the original Phelps Sanitarium building was demolished in 1985.

== Description ==
The Phelps Sanitarium was constructed entirely of fieldstone, and at the time of construction was reputed to be the largest fieldstone building in the United States.
