= The Art of Massage =

1895 book by John Harvey Kellogg

The Art of Massage is an 1895 book by John Harvey Kellogg. Kellogg supported pushing the idea that massage can help stimulate muscles to prevent their degradation.

== Description ==
He begins by talking about the influence of the Chinese on the practice. They were seen as one of the first people to use massage to help relieve illness, and had particularly important contributions to the development of the field. One of the books produced from their studies was The Cong-Fou of the Tao-Tse. Kellogg's book was so influential that as of the year 2000, it was still used in the curriculum at the Ohio School of Massage.

After the history of massage, he has a section discussing different parts of the body and how they should be manipulated. After this, there is space devoted to laying out what the pupil should study and examine so as to become better at the art. The effects of massage on the participant's body are explored, and special attention is paid to particular benefits, such as fighting or holding off certain illnesses. This is an idea Kellogg advocated for in many different contexts besides just this book. The actual practice of massage is broken down into the specific movements that a masseur could use to achieve different effects, such as kneading or stroking. Joint movements are considered, and then the piece delves into how to massage separate parts of the body. There are special massages for each distinct body part he focuses on. Kellogg believes that the techniques are important for every part of the body, whether it is necessary to perform the practice on that area or by massaging other parts of the body that are connected to it. The list includes the arm, chest, leg, abdomen, hip, and back, and each associated massage is very specific and has many intricate instructions.

Kellogg is known for pushing the idea that massage can help stimulate muscles so as to prevent their degradation. Then, as a way of replacing human hands, massage machines are discussed. In some cases, Kellogg feels like certain devices actually work better than hands, while there are certain massage techniques that cannot be replaced accurately by machines without losing something in the process. After introducing the unique machines used to give people massages, the improvements to the devices over time are examined. Kellogg takes care to mention Metzger and Isidor Zabludowski, two prominent masseurs that were well-established at the time this work was written. However, he dotes on the practices of Zabludowski, and tends to dismiss Metzger as someone who has not contributed in a way that Kellogg deemed substantial or helpful to the growth of the practice. Through this neglect of Metzger, Kellogg makes it clear that he values the physiological effects of the massage greatly when he claims that Metzger has done nothing to assist in this field.

The next section attempts to make a distinction between men and women in terms of the number of muscles they each have. A chart was made describing each type of muscle being observed. In every category, men were believed to have more muscles than women. There was not one category where the number of muscles present in men was equal to the number in women. After this, Kellogg talks about the importance of rest. He mentions the fact that for many years, people and doctors had believed rest was a crucial part of recovering from illnesses. However, he said that the concept of rest had become so powerful that at the time he wrote this piece, people actually started to think of the process as a "rest-cure". Kellogg has detailed notes about rules that masseurs should follow, such as not massaging anyone while sick, making sure that they look professional and clean, and giving the massage in a room of a certain temperature range (75–85˚ F). Besides these guidelines, he also takes the time to describe to others all of the various terminology involved with the field. Definitions are provided for words such as massage, masseuse, and for direction of movements like "centripetal". Then, there is an extensive chart provided that goes into detailed information about the names of the muscles, nerves associated with it, and the actions that the particular muscle has in relation to the rest of the body. Alongside the chart, there is some information about muscle contraction and the chemicals that may be involved in movements.

== Appendices ==
After the main sections, there is a group of appendices. Appendix one focuses on clinical cases that show the use of massage in actual cases with patients. Some of the cases describe patients who lost weight due to massage therapy, others describe individuals who originally suffered from certain diseases and then received massage therapy, which helped them relieve symptoms, or actually seemed to cure their ailment. Some researchers in modern times still believe massage has successful applications in the realm of medicine, and they support a few of Kellogg's theories. For instance, some physicians believe that Kellogg's idea for massaging the abdomen when the patient is constipated provides a nice alternative form of treatment, rather than giving them harsh medicines that will take a toll on their bodies. In some cases, the treatments described in the book are taken with almost no changes, and practice of the technique is encouraged exactly how Kellogg intended it to be. Even the descriptions Kellogg uses the describe the effects of massage are sometimes unadulterated. Appendix two starts by praising the "Schott Method", which used exercises and baths to help soothe patients. There are also images that display the practices Kellogg tries to encourage, as well as pictures of muscles and parts of the body.
