= Race Betterment Foundation =

Eugenics and racial hygiene organization

The Race Betterment Foundation was a eugenics and racial hygiene organization founded in 1914 at Battle Creek, Michigan by John Harvey Kellogg due to his concerns about what he perceived as "race degeneracy". The foundation supported conferences (including three National Conferences on Race Betterment), publications (Good Health), and the formation of a eugenics registry in cooperation with the ERO (Eugenics Record Office). The foundation also sponsored the Fitter Families Campaign from 1928 to the late 1930s and funded Battle Creek College. The foundation controlled the Battle Creek Food Company, which in turn served as the major source for Kellogg's eugenics programs, conferences, and Battle Creek College. In his will, Kellogg left his entire estate to the foundation. In 1947, the foundation had over $687,000 in assets but by 1967 the foundation's accounts were a mere $492.87, prompting the State of Michigan to close the Foundation and indict the trustees for squandering the funds.

== Founders ==
John Harvey Kellogg founded the organization with Irving Fisher and Charles Davenport.

=== John Harvey Kellogg ===
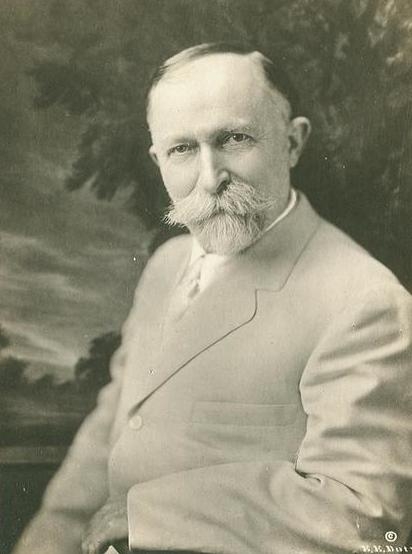
John Harvey Kellogg

John Harvey Kellogg (February 26, 1852 – December 14, 1943) was a physician, eugenicist, promoter of physical fitness and vegetarianism. He profoundly influenced numerous movements, including ones for pure food and drugs, public health, personal hygiene, physical culture and exercise, temperance, purity, and eugenics. He was the head physician and director of the Battle Creek Sanitarium.

=== Irving Fisher ===
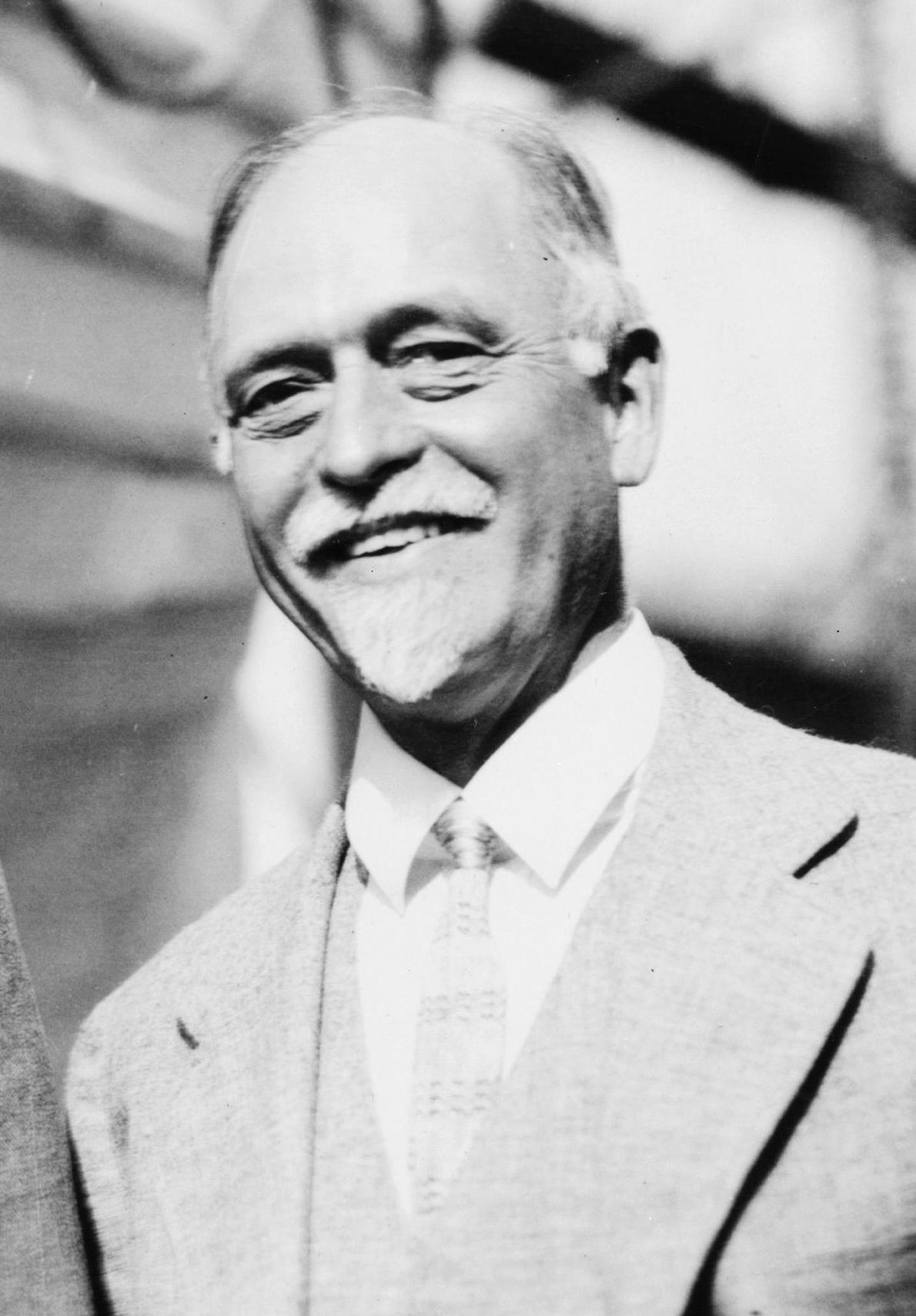
Irving Fisher

Irving Fisher (February 27, 1867 – April 29, 1947) was an economics professor and a pivotal reformer during the Progressive Era's Clean Living movement. He greatly influenced campaigns embracing eugenics, supporting sterilization and the segregation of "defectives" in institutions and positive eugenic programs including the fitter families campaign. He was also a key leader in eugenics movements. He established the American Eugenics Society with Madison Grant, Harry H. Laughlin, and several others in 1926, and was the society's first president (1922–1926) when it was still a committee at the Second International Eugenics Congress (1921). He was also vice president of the Third International Congress, a member of executive committee of the National Conferences for Race Betterment, president of the Eugenics Research Association (1920), and a member of the Eugenics Registry's governing committee.

=== Charles Davenport ===
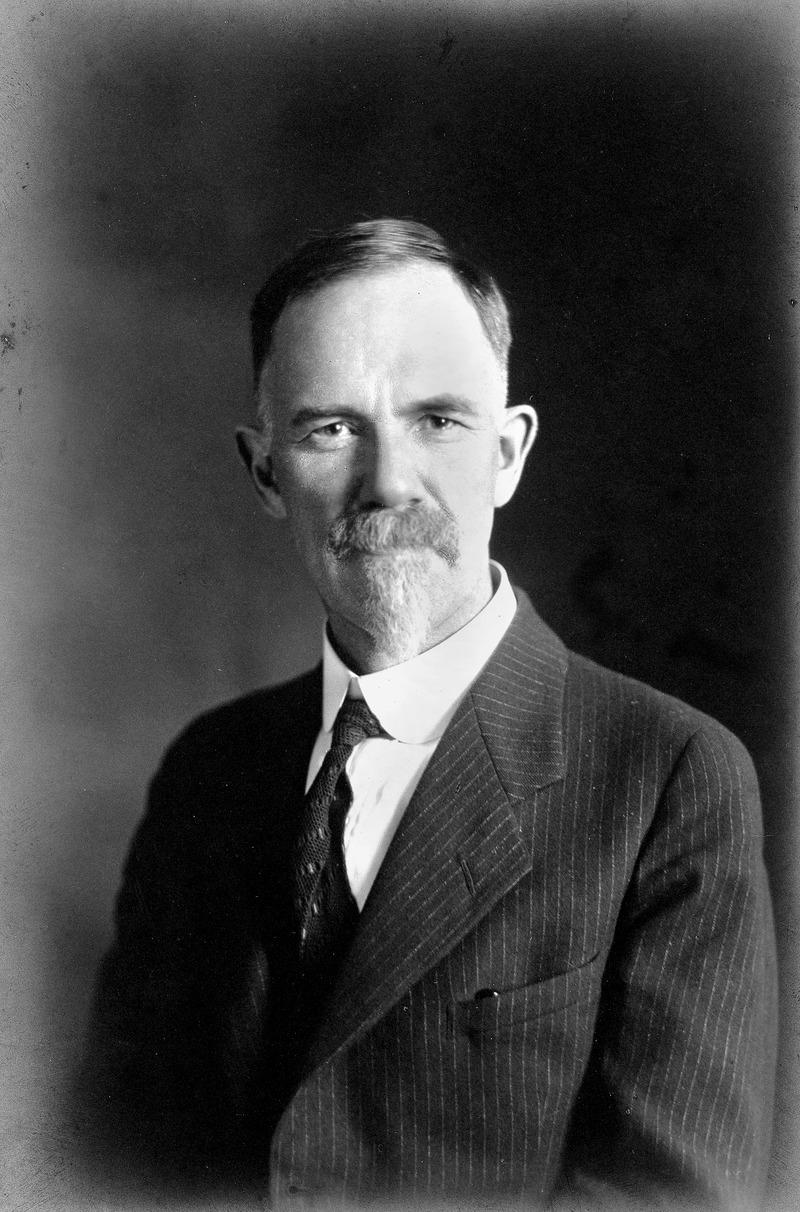
Charles Benedict Davenport

Charles Davenport (June 1, 1866 – February 18, 1944) was a well-known biologist and eugenicist, who introduced biometrics into American science and applied it in eugenics. He was the pivotal figure of the American eugenics movement, who made eugenics an underlying principle in many reform crusades of his day through his writing and great influence. Due to his eugenics concerns, he opposed Margaret Sanger and her birth control movement, while supporting immigration restriction and eugenical legislation.

== National Conferences on Race Betterment ==
The Race Betterment Foundation achieved its peak in power during the three National Conferences on Race Betterment (1914, 1915, 1928). The conferences, focusing on hygiene and eugenics, were held under the support of John Harvey Kellogg and Race Betterment Foundation.

=== First National Conference on Race Betterment ===
The First National Conference on Race Betterment was held at the Battle Creek Sanitarium (John Harvey Kellogg is its owner), on June 1–6, 1914. Over 400 delegates attended the conference. The topic of the conference was to improve the health and quality of the human race taking hereditarian and environmental effects into concern. A eugenics registry was suggested by Kellogg to promote individuals to concern their marriage in terms of heredity. Other subject themes included the elimination of tobacco, alcohol, and prostitution through stricter laws. The conference received much public interest, and thus gave the foundation the chance to be present on the Panama Pacific Exposition in San Francisco on August 4–8, 1915.

=== Second National Conference on Race Betterment ===
The second conference was held in San Francisco during the days of the Panama Pacific Exposition (August 4–8, 1915). This conference had fewer delegates and professional papers compared to the previous one. A eugenics registry was again encouraged by Kellogg.

==== Panama–Pacific Exposition ====
The theme of the 1915 exposition included "acceleration of all that the New world had accomplished" since Columbus' discovery of America, the opening of Panama Canal, the reconstruction of San Francisco from the 1906 earthquake, and "multiculturalist ambitions", etc. "Novelty" was a most import element can be found everywhere.

The "scientific" doctrine of race betterment through the practice of eugenics was part of the exposition. The Race Betterment Congress was held by the exposition, and leading eugenicists made speeches on the best methods for achieving higher racial purity (Kellogg's support of eugenic registry as an example).

In addition to their meeting in the beginning of August, the Race Betterment Foundation also had a spot in the Palace of Education. They advertised eugenics and reminded passers-by of the race's glorious past and possible future. Their contribution, according to Frank Morton Todd, the official historian of the Exposition, showed "the necessity for its work".

Besides the section of eugenics, the exposition had a mile long stretch of Joy Zone that re-created villages of natives in a depiction of life in far-away lands. The description was stereotypical and racial, which was intended to express the necessity of eugenics movements.

=== Third National Conference on Race Betterment ===
The initially planned third conference was interrupted by World War I. As a result, the third conference was not held until January 1928 at the Battle Creek Sanitarium. Unlike the previous two, the third conference was academic oriented and consisted of scholar presentations under the planning and presiding of Clarence C. Little, president of the University of Michigan. The subject matter was divided into twelve sections, including heredity and eugenics, crime and sterilization, immigration and man, etc. It was viewed as "really a volume of applied anthropology" and the topics were related "directly or indirectly to man's welfare" in a contemporary review of the conference published in 1929 in American Journal of Physical Anthropology. The fitter family contest was one of the consequences of this conference.

=== Afterward ===
A fourth congress was planned, but was interrupted by the Great Depression, World War II, and Kellogg's death, one after the other. After the war, due to the actions of Nazi Germany in perpetrating the Holocaust, neither race betterment nor eugenics were acceptable concepts in academic discussion.

== Other activities ==
=== Battle Creek Food Company ===
Kellogg organized the Battle Creek Sanitarium Food Company as a subsidiary of the Battle Creek Sanitarium with his brother Will Keith Kellogg in 1890. The brothers developed a method of producing crunchy, flavorful flakes of processed grain that became a popular breakfast food among the patients at Battle Creek Sanitarium. However, due to their dispute over the distribution of their cornflake cereal, W. K. Kellogg bought out his brother and in 1906 established the Kellogg Toasted Corn Flakes Company (later renamed Kellogg Company). After splitting with his brother, J. H. Kellogg formed the Battle Creek Food Company to develop and market soy products and health foods. The company was purchased by Eugene McKay and George McKay after World War II.

The Battle Creek Food Company was also a major source of funding for the Race Betterment Foundation.

=== Good Health Journal ===
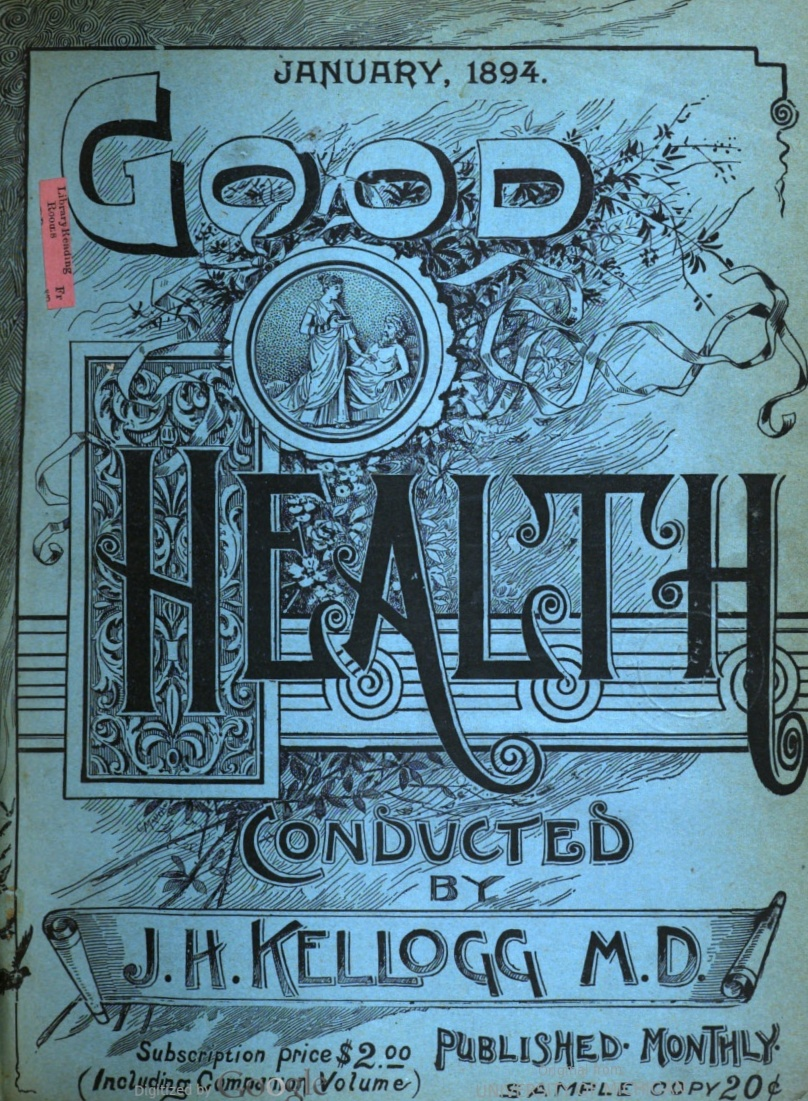
Good Health, January 1894 cover

The Good Health journal was funded by the Race Betterment Foundation. The journal was the official organ for many years of the foundation and at various times of other similar organizations. Its initial name was Health Reformer, which started in 1866. Kellogg became the editor of the journal in 1874. He changed its name to Good Health in 1879, and served as its editor for 65 years until his death in 1943. After Kellogg's death, the editor was James Thomas Case, from August 1944 to August 1953. The Good Health journal had more than 20,000 subscribers and was published until 1955.

Kellogg was an advocator of soyfoods. Starting in March 1921, he began to publish articles about soyfoods in Good Health. During the 1930s, Kellogg became increasingly enthusiastic about soyfoods and there were more articles published in the journal. In August 1936, Good Health published a recipe for Soy Acidophilus Ice Cream, made from the cultured soymilk.

=== Eugenics Registry ===
The idea of a eugenics registry was first raised by John Harvey Kellogg during the First National Race Betterment Conference in 1914. The registry was established after the Second National Race Betterment Conference in San Francisco in 1915 in cooperation of Race Betterment Foundation and the Eugenics Record Office. The purpose of the registry was stated on its family information survey forms as:

1. To make an inventory and record of the socially important hereditary traits and tendencies of the individual.
2. To point out, as far as possible, the conditions under which these traits and tendencies may express themselves in succeeding generations.
3. To contribute to the growth and spread of our knowledge of natural inheritance in man.
4. To assist in the maintenance and increase of natural endowments and to combat race decay.

The board members included pioneering eugenicists: David Starr Jordan, president; John Harvey Kellogg, secretary; Irving Fisher, Luther Burbank, and Charles Davenport, director of the ERO. The registry collected information on thousands of families during its years of operation until 1935.

=== Fitter Family Campaign ===
The Fitter Family campaign was evolved from Better Babies contests, which was popular during pre-World War I years. The latter was associated with eugenics at the Kansas Free Fair in 1920, and was developed into "Fitter Families for Future Firesides" competitions under the direction of Mary Tirrell Watts and Florence Brown Sherbon. The initial sponsor of the competition was the Red Cross (1920–1924), then Rockefeller and Eastman (1924–1926), and then was transferred to Race Betterment Foundation under Luther S. West's direction in 1928. The campaign was a prime example of a positive eugenics program, focusing on teaching young adults familiar with their personal eugenical history how to choose their mates more prudently, and thus leading to a "fitter humanstock".

=== Battle Creek College ===
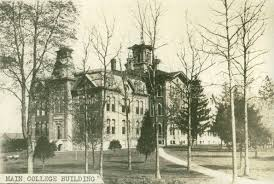
Battle Creek College main building, photo from the Twenty-first Annual Calendar of Battle Creek College, published in 1896.

Battle Creek College rooted in the Battle Creek Sanitarium, which was formed in 1866 as an institution of the Seventh-day Adventist Church at the beginning. The predecessors of Battle Creek College include the Training School for Nurses opened in 1884, the Battle Creek Sanitarium School of Health and Home Economics, which primarily served to train dieticians, founded in 1906, and the Normal School for Physical Education was founded in 1909. Kellogg chartered Battle Creek College in 1923 by bringing the three professional schools together and adding a liberal arts school. Battle Creek College became fully accredited by the North Central Association of Colleges in 1926. John Harvey Kellogg was the first president of the college.

The fundamental purpose of this colleges was "race betterment through eugenics and euthenics is the primary and essential object of this College", as stated in its Articles of Association. Hence all the students, faculty members, and officers of the college were required to be "earnest and enthusiastic supporters and promoters of race betterment principles and methods".

The college closed in 1938.

== See also ==
- American Eugenics Society
- Eugenics Record Office
- Human Betterment Foundation
