= Israel Zabludowski =

Russian physician and researcher

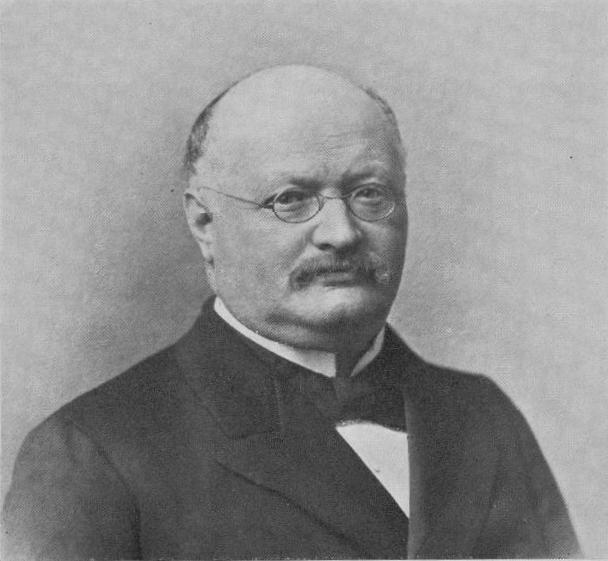
- Born: July 30, 1850; Białystok, Grodno Governorate, Russian Empire
- Died: 1906
- Occupation: Physician
- Medical career
- Field: Massage therapy

Israel (Isidor) Zabludowski (Yiddish: ישראל בן בנימין זאַבלודאָװסקי; July 30, 1850 – November 24, 1906) was a Russian physician and medical researcher. The majority of his publications were on massage and therapeutic gymnastics.

== Biography ==
Israel Zabludowski was born in 1850 in Białystok, Grodno Governorate. His father was an affluent merchant who owned several properties in the city, and established the city's Choral Synagogue and Jewish Hospital. At the age of 12, he wrote a Hebrew novel called Ha-yaldut veha-shaḥarut ('Childhood and Adulthood').

In 1869, he was admitted to the military medical academy in St. Petersburg, where he received his medical degree in 1874. Seven years later, he was appointed as a physician at a military hospital in southern Russia. During the Russo-Turkish War, Zabludowski served as the chief physician for a Cossack regiment near Plevna and received the second rank of the Order of Saint Stanislaus for his work.

While working in the field hospital, Zabludowski became interested in the massage techniques used by a Bulgarian monk named Makari. He adopted massage as his specialty and was sent abroad by the Russian government to study it further. After visiting Vienna, Munich, Paris, Amsterdam, and Berlin, he returned to St. Petersburg in 1881 and was appointed chief physician at the hospital of the Preobrazhenski Regiment of the Imperial Guards. He conducted experiments on healthy individuals and published a treatise on massage in the Voyenno-Meditzinski Zhurnal (St. Petersburg, 1882).

In 1884, Zabludowski was invited to Berlin by Bergmann, where he became his clinical assistant and published several essays on massage. He also lectured on the subject at the medical congress of Copenhagen in 1884. He was the author of many articles on massage, including a description of a machine he invented for the treatment of writer's cramp. In 1896, he was appointed titular professor of massage at the University of Berlin, a position he held until at least 1905. He treated Emperor Frederick III in 1888.
