= Clean living movement =

Cultural movement

In the history of the United States, a clean living movement is a period of time when a surge of health-reform crusades erupts into the popular consciousness. This results in individual, or group reformers such as the anti-tobacco or alcohol coalitions of the late twentieth century, to campaign to eliminate the health problem or to "clean up" society. The term "Clean Living Movement" was coined by Ruth C. Engs, a professor of Applied Health Sciences at Indiana University in 1990.

== Background ==
Cycles of social reforms have been observed in religion, politics, the economy and other areas of human endeavor. Reforms to clean up society in regard to issues related to health also appear to come in cycles. Reform campaigns during Clean Living Movements include temperance (anti-alcohol), social purity (sexuality), diet, physical exercise, eugenics (heredity), public health, and anti-tobacco and drug campaigns. Interest in these issues rise and fall more or less simultaneously and often follow a religious awakening in which both evangelical sentiments and the development of new sects emerge. The movements also coincide with episodes of xenophobia or moral panic in which various minorities are targeted as undesirable influences for medical or moral reasons.

In the United States of America, and to somewhat of a lesser extent in the United Kingdom and other Western European cultures, these health reform movements tend to come in approximate 80-year cycles, ranging from about 70 to 90 years for individual issues. However, the campaign to eliminate polio would not be considered a clean living movement as it was a single issue crusade.

Reformers in these movements first attempt to convince individuals they should not drink, smoke or engage in behaviors or lifestyles harmful to health. When this does not work, public policies to prohibit the behaviors are instituted. After the main thrust of the movement, when reformers have failed to change behaviors even by legislation, a hereditarian, or eugenics movement reaches its prime. Reformers may reason that the root causes must be in the genes. During the cycle's ebb, popular changes or reforms that make sense, such as personal hygiene or sanitation, become institutionalized. On the other hand, a backlash often emerges against unpopular or restrictive reforms, such as prohibition of alcohol.

In the United States, widespread health agitation and subsequent reforms have, within a decade or so, coincided with the religious awakenings of the Jacksonian (1830-1860), the Progressive (1890-1920), and the Millennial (1970-) reform eras.

== Jacksonian era (1830–1860) ==
During the Jacksonian era and out of the second great awakening, a crusade against "Demon rum" and other spirits ensued in states east of the Mississippi River and north of the Mason–Dixon line. This resulted in statewide prohibition of alcohol in this region beginning in the state of Maine in 1851. However, rampant smuggling across the Ohio River and down from Canada soon ended these state laws as they were unenforceable. Various ethnic, cultural, and religious minorities, such as Irish immigrants and Roman Catholics, were held up as moral examples during the period, thought to be responsible for both excessive drinking and the spread of diseases such as cholera.

During this era, a focus on exercise, non-use of tobacco, and the elimination of coffee, tea, sugar, meat and spice from a diet, called "Grahamism," – named after reformer Sylvester Graham – was promoted. Eugenic or "hereditarian" concerns that masturbation would lead to insanity and that choosing sick or feeble spouses would lead to further degeneration were discussed. Out of this era, Phrenology – the study of shapes and bumps on the head – used to select a healthy marriage partner was popular. New religions that promoted wholesome lifestyles, such as the Church of Jesus Christ of Latter-day Saints and Seventh-day Adventists emerged.

== Progressive Era (1890–1920) ==
The Progressive Era's health reform movement emerged in the third great awakening. Individual health crusades, as part of an overall Clean Living Movement, included the temperance and the anti-saloon movement, which evolved into the prohibition movement. This resulted in the Eighteenth Amendment, or prohibition. An anti-tobacco movement was found during this era, and a number of cities had anti-smoking laws in public buildings. Trains, restaurants, and streetcars often had smoking and non-smoking sections. However, these laws by the mid twentieth-century were generally ignored.

The first regulation of narcotic drugs was enacted during this period, regulating the contents of patent medicines. The first Pure Food and Drug Act, regulating the labelling of patent medicines and the claims made in their advertising, was passed in 1906. The smoking of opium was prohibited by the Harrison Narcotics Tax Act of 1914 as an exotic vice imported with immigration from China. In addition to these drug prohibitions, further immigration from East Asia was sharply curtailed by the Asian Exclusion Act of 1924. Likewise, the prohibition of cocaine during this period was associated with anecdotes about African Americans committing crimes under the influence of the drug.

A "purity" or anti-prostitution and social hygiene (sexually transmitted diseases) movement went hand in hand with the elimination of other supposed evils, such as alcohol, from society. The purity movement also included the elimination of the double standard of sexuality for men and women. The eugenics movement to improve the human race was intertwined with these other movements. Pre-marital testing to ensure that neither partner had syphilis was passed in many states. In the United States, eugenic sterilization laws were passed to prevent individuals with severe mental or physical health problems, including alcoholism, from reproducing were instituted in over 30 states.

== Millennial era (1970–present) ==
The Clean Living Movement around the turn of the twenty-first century was characterized by many crusades and counter crusades. Activities that surged in the earlier years of the era were often met with counter-movements about ten years later. For example, "women’s liberation" was countered by a "pro-family" movement; the use of marijuana and other drugs was followed by a "war on drugs"; lowering of the drinking age was followed by a raising of the drinking age; non-marital sexual activity was challenged by a new "purity" movement; and legal rights to obtaining abortions ("pro-choice") were met with agitation against abortion ("pro-life").

The baby boom generation of the post World War II era had experimented with different behaviors not tolerated by the older generation. By the mid-1970s, more conservative Americans began to react against what they perceived as immoral behaviors. They coalesced into political action that included campaigns against the use of drugs, alcohol, sexual, and other activities. A secular health-reform movement, that to some became a "religion," also surged out of the youthful generation. Fitness and exercise, diet, alternative religions and medicine, consumers rights, smoke-free environments, and other health reforms became prime concerns of the day.

== See also ==
- Clean eating
- Hygiene
- Moral panic
