= Mechanotherapy =

Type of physiotherapy

Mechanotherapy is a type of medical therapeutics in which treatment is given by manual or mechanical means. Mechanotherapy is a general term for physical therapy modalities that exploit mechanobiology principles for tissue rehabilitation and regeneration using the application of specific mechanical forces. The terms was defined in 1890 as “the employment of mechanical means for the cure of disease”. Mechanotherapy employs mechanotransduction to stimulate tissue repair and remodelling.

== History ==
The American College of Mechano-Therapy operated in Chicago between roughly 1905 and 1920. It was founded by William C. Schulze, an 1897 graduate of Rush Medical College and practicing MD licensed in Illinois, Minnesota, and Wisconsin. Schulze was born in Germany in 1870. He incorporated the American College of Mechano-Therapy in 1907 and served as its president. Purporting to be the “largest eclectic school of drugless healing in the world,” the college offered a training course via correspondence. Though heavily criticized by the medical establishment, mechanical methods of healing nonetheless were increasingly popular in North America in the early part of the 20th century.

The American College of Mechano-Therapy published several books, such as "Text-book of Osteopathy" (1910) or "Clinical Lectures on Mechano-therapy" (1915).

== Exercise ==
Mechanotherapy is used as term for exercise prescription to promote healing and rehabilitation. Mechanotherapy is a useful term for exercise which is prescribed for rehabilitation because tissue repair is driven by the physiological process of mechanotransduction.

== Uses ==
=== Tendon ===
Tendon, as a tissue, is mechanoresponsive. Various academic studies show that tendons can respond well to controlled loading, post-injury. Loading of a tendon results in up regulation of insulin-like growth factor, in addition to other cytokines and growth factors. This upregulation causes tendon cells to proliferate and remodel the matrix.

=== Muscle ===
The clinical justification for the use of mechanotherapy in muscle injury is formed from initial animal studies. Generally, a rest period is undertaken to allow stabilisation of scar tissue, which is followed by controlled loading.

Loading of muscle leads to up regulation of a number of load-induced pathways, including mechanogrowth factor (MGF). MGF expression results in activation of satellite cells and hypertrophy. Loading in this setting can increase rate and completeness of regeneration, improve myotubule alignment, and minimise myotubule atrophy.

=== Bone ===
One of the integral components of bone are osteocytes, which act as the primary mechanosensors. Evidence suggests that mechanotherapy can be useful in the rehabilitation of bone fractures. Loading bone during rehabilitation can result in significantly increased strength and range of motion, compared with immobilized patients.

== Massage ==
Another related use of the term Mechanotherapy is the original term for therapeutic massage. It was developed as an independent branch of manual medicine in Sweden in the early 20th century. It quickly became popular in the U.S. and many chiropractic colleges in the U.S. in the first half of the 20th century also offered separate degree programs in mechanotherapy. Mechanotherapists received a Doctor of Mechanotherapy (DM) degree and were licensed to practice in many states and practiced in many more states without a license. A DM degree is a graduate professional degree that indicates proficiency in mechano- or massage therapy. Mechanotherapists do not claim to be physicians or to diagnose or treat diseases.
