= Riverside Sanitarium and Hospital =

Defunct medical institution in Nashville, Tennessee, USA

Coordinates: 36.2031°N 86.7969°W

Riverside Sanitarium Hospital was a medical institution founded in 1901 in Nashville, Tennessee. It primarily served the city's African-American community from 1927 to 1983. It was the first black Seventh-day Adventist medical facility in the United States, providing modern healthcare to African Americans who faced discrimination in mainstream hospitals. It simultaneously attracting physicians, nurses, and patients from across the country. Riverside Sanitarium Hospital played a role in advancing medical opportunities, was a pioneer for modern medicine, and served as a leader in alternative medical therapies. It grew from five small rooms in 1901 into a hospital by 1927 with a 50-bed brick building. Then it expanded to a modern four-story facility with 85 beds in June 1948, and further developed into a three-story hospital with 290 beds in 1976.

== History ==
=== Founding (1901–1927) ===
Riverside Sanitarium, originally known as the Nashville Colored Sanitarium, was founded in 1901 by the Southern Union Conference of Seventh-day Adventists. The primary purpose was to expand Adventist medical missionary efforts to African-Americans, who at the time had extremely limited access to adequate healthcare. The sanitarium's first physician was Lottie C. Isbell, a graduate of the American Medical Missionary College in Battle Creek, Michigan, who became the sanitarium's first physician. Operating out of small treatment rooms on North Cherry Street, the facility offered a range of alternative medical treatments such as hydrotherapy. Despite its innovative approach, the sanitarium faced controversy in Nashville and struggled financially due to local skepticism. The sanitarium later moved to the Hillcrest Area on White Creeks Pike, but the relocation was ultimately unsuccessful due to limited clientele, leading to its closure.

=== Expansion (1927–1940s) ===
In 1927 efforts to transform the institution into a fully operational hospital were led by Nellie H. Druillard, an Adventist Missionary and philanthropist who was instrumental in securing the finances for the expansion. During the early 1900s, she and her husband served as a missionary in South Africa holding key roles advancing Adventist initiatives. In 1935, the institution officially gained recognition as an Adventist facility after receiving a property donation valued at $300,000 by Nellie H. Druillard who was a former missionary. Her contributions were critical in enabling the hospital to offer modern healthcare to Nashville's African American population at a time where segregation restricted access to medical facilities and healthcare. The hospital earned recognition for its high-quality care, attracting Black physicians and nurses from across the nation.

=== Growth and leadership (1940s–1970s) ===
Carl A. Dent was appointed as the hospital’s medical director in 1940. A milestone occurred on September 5, 1948, with the new dedication of a new 85-bed hospital building, a major step in the sanitarium's expansion. The dedication event attracted 1,500 attendees, including prominent Seventh-day Adventist leaders such as J.L. McElhany, G.E. Peters and N.C. Wilson. Over time, Riverside became a symbol for Black medical professionals seeking a racially inclusive medical environment. In 1963, the hospital saw the construction of the Pagoda of Medicine, a mid-century modern medical building designed by architect Leon Q. Jackson. This building would later become a landmark associated with Nashville’s African American medical history. In 1962 Elder Charles E. Dudley was elected president of the South Central Conference of Seventh-day Adventists, who advocated for the hospital during his long tenure.

=== Decline and closure (1970s–1983) ===
Plans to expand continued in the 1970s with new facilities being made by the McKissack Farm. Financial hardship and the changing healthcare landscape ultimately lead to the sanitarium’s decline. By 1983, the Adventist Health System closed Riverside Hospital completely, ending of an era of one of Nashville’s most significant medical institutions.

== Notable figures ==
T.R.M. Howard was the first medical director of Riverside Sanitarium in 1937 and became the Chief Surgeon of the Taborian Hospital in Mound Bayou, Mississippi.

Dorothy Lavinia Brown (1919–2004) was a renowned African-American surgeon. Brown studied at Meharry Medical College under Matthew Walker and became the first black female surgeon in the South. At Riverside Hospital, she served as Chief of Surgery and was the first African-American woman to be made a fellow of the African American College of Surgeons. In 1966, she became the first African-American woman elected to the Tennessee General Assembly.

Carl Ashley Dent (1914 – 1995) was a widely recognized African-American physician and missionary for the African-American Seventh-Day Adventist Church, Riverside Chapel in Nashville. In 1938, Dent became the first African-American offered a medical internship at the L.A County General Hospital. In 1940, Dent became the medical director of Riverside Sanitarium. He played a crucial role in the hospital’s growth and success and commissioned the construction of the mid-century modern Pagoda of Medicine in 1963, designed by Leon Q. Jackson.

Elder Charles E. Dudley, a minister and conference president, was born on February 1, 1927 in South Bend, Indiana. Elected in 1962 as president of the South Central Conference of Seventh-day Adventists, Dudley was an advocate for Riverside Hospital, ensuring its impact continued throughout his 30-year tenure.

Lottie C. Isbell (Blake), a graduate from the American Medical Missionary College in Battle Creek, was in charge of Riverside Sanitarium.

== Recognition ==
On September 29, 2018, a historical marker was unveiled in honor of the Riverside Sanitarium and Hospital for its contributions to Nashville’s African American community. The marker was created and placed by the Metropolitan Historical Commission of Nashville and Davidson County, partnering with the Riverside Historical Society.

The unveiling was held at Riverside Nashville Church, where former hospital staff, community leaders, and descendants of patients at the hospital came together in honor of this institution. Speakers included Peter Edmund Millet, vice president of Meharry Medical College, and Womack H. Rucker Jr. the last president of the Riverside Hospital, and U.S. Congressman Jim Cooper, representing Tennessee’s 5th District.

=== Continued influence ===
Although the hospital is no longer operational, its impact on African American medical excellence continues. The Pagoda of Medicine continues to stand as a symbol of Black excellence, where the Riverside Historical Society actively preserves its historical significance, emphasizing the importance of remembering what the hospital accomplished to healthcare and racial equity.
