= The Urantia Book =

Spiritual and philosophical book

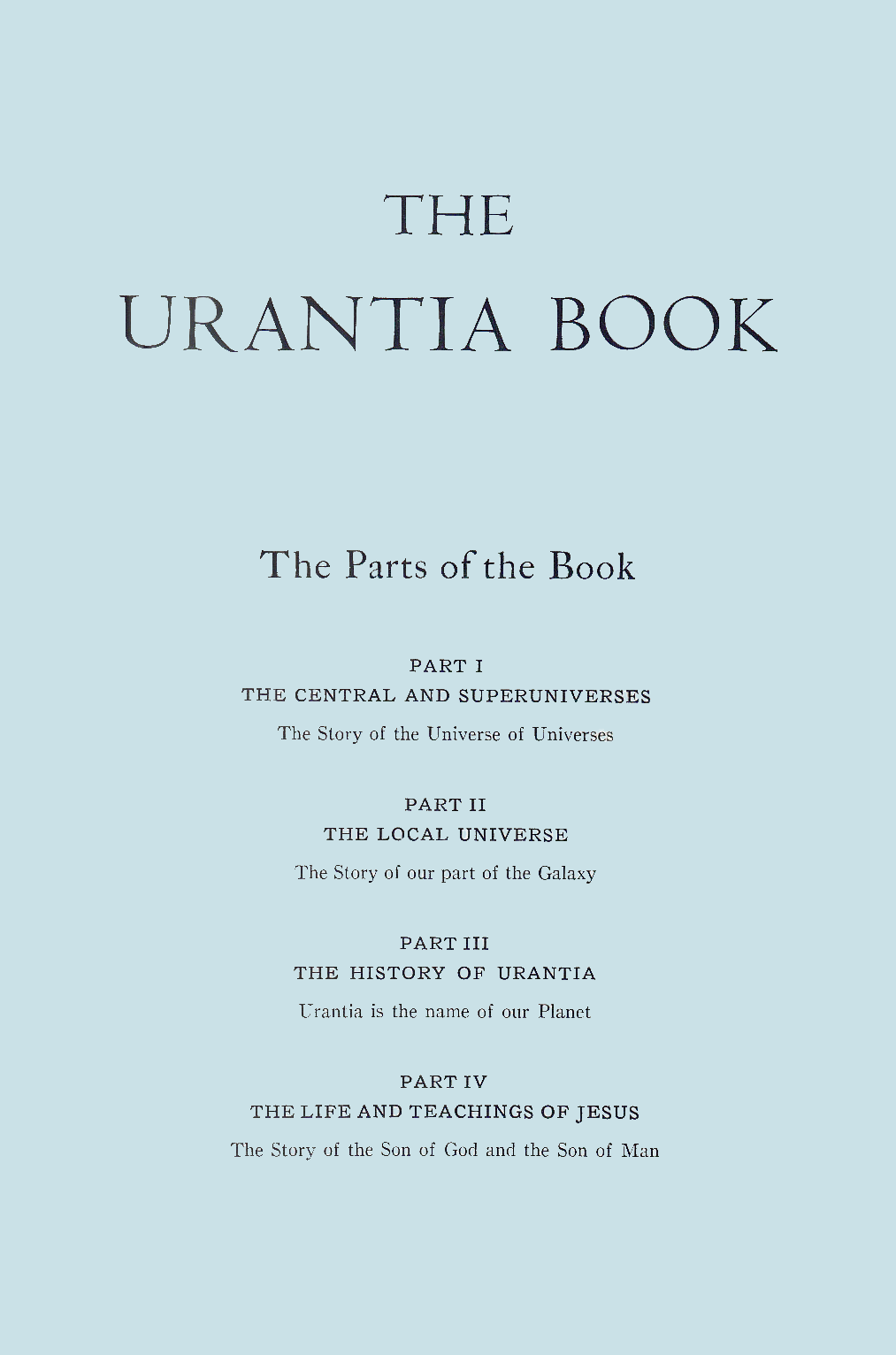
- First edition
- Author: Anonymous
- Publisher: Urantia Foundation (original), others (since becoming public domain in 2001)
- Publication date: 12 October 1955
- Media type: Print
- Pages: 2,097 (1st edition)
- ISBN: 0-911560-02-5
- OCLC: 49687706

The Urantia Book (sometimes called The Urantia Papers or The Fifth Epochal Revelation) is a spiritual, philosophical, and religious book that originated in Chicago, Illinois, United States, sometime between 1924 and 1955.

The text, which claims to have been composed by celestial beings, introduces the word "Urantia" as the name of the planet Earth and states that its intent is to "present enlarged concepts and advanced truth". The book aims to unite religion, science, and philosophy. Its large amount of content on topics of interest to science is unique among documents said to have been received from celestial beings. Among other topics, the book discusses the origin and meaning of life, mankind's place in the universe, the history of Earth, the relationship between God and people, and the life of Jesus.

The Urantia Foundation, a U.S.-based non-profit group, first published The Urantia Book in 1955. In 2001, a jury found that the English-language book's copyright was no longer valid in the United States after 1983. Therefore, the English text of the book became a public domain work in the United States, and in 2006 the international copyright expired. (Note: Urantia Foundation acknowledges on their website that under the Berne Convention the international copyright expired on 1 January 2006.)

How it arrived at the form published in 1955 is unclear and a matter of debate. The book itself claims that its "basis" is found in "more than one thousand human concepts representing the highest and most advanced planetary knowledge". Analysis of The Urantia Book has found that it repeated portions of numerous pre-existing published works by human authors with only the above "basis" as attribution. Despite this general acknowledgment of derivation from human authors, the book contains no specific references to those sources. It has received both praise and criticism for its religious and science-related content, and is noted for its unusual length and the unusual names and origins of its reputed celestial contributors.

== Background ==
=== Authorship ===
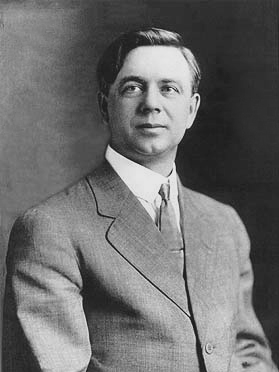
William S. Sadler

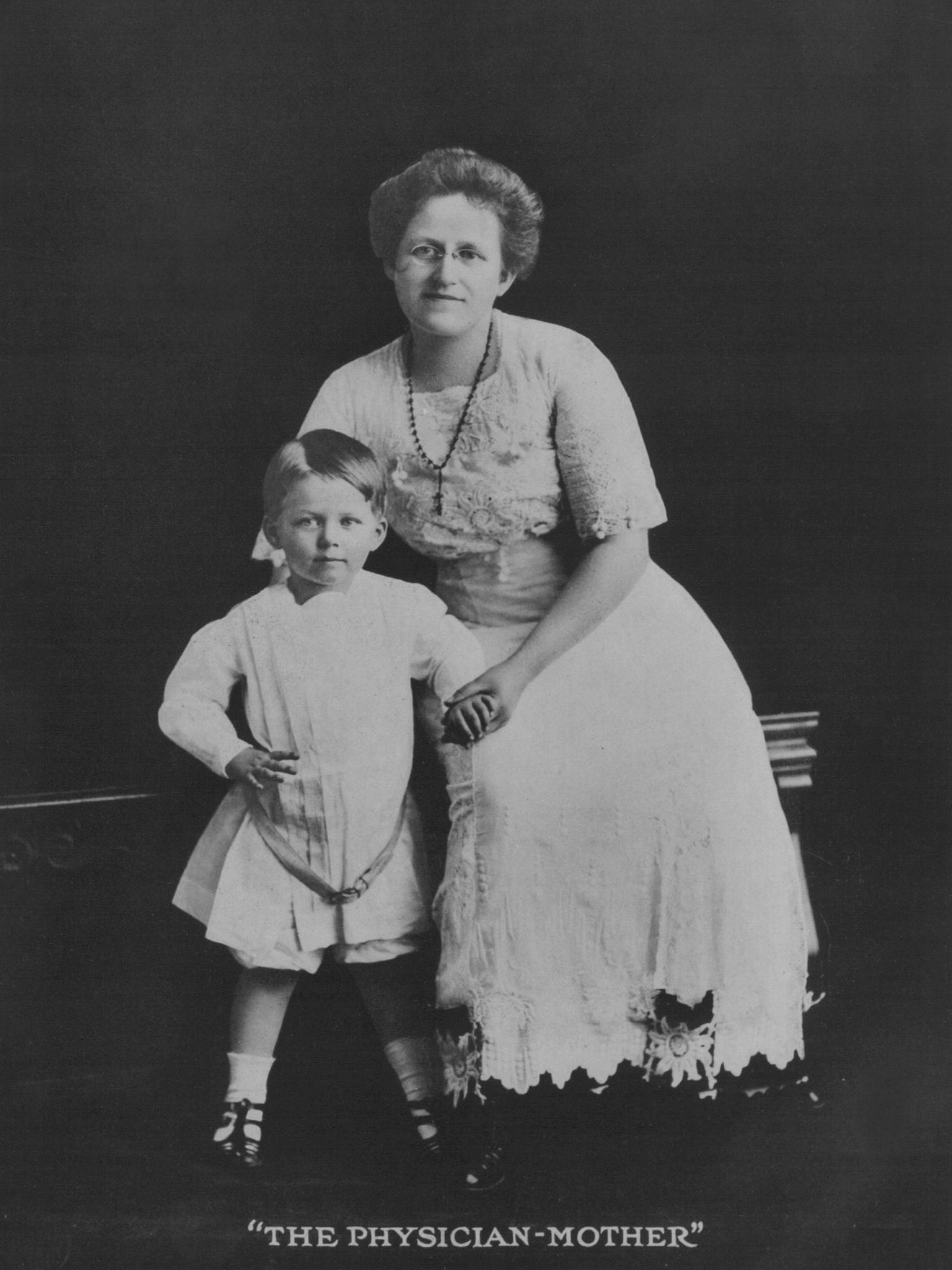
Lena K. Sadler

The exact circumstances of the origin of The Urantia Book are unknown. The book and its publishers do not name a human author. Instead, it is written as if directly presented by numerous celestial beings appointed to the task of providing an "epochal" religious revelation.

William S. Sadler and his wife Lena Sadler, physicians in Chicago and well known in the community, are said to have been approached as early as 1911 by a neighbor who was concerned because she would occasionally find her husband in a deep sleep and breathing abnormally. She reported that she was unable to wake him at these times. The Sadlers came to observe the episodes, and over time, the individual produced verbal communications that claimed to be from "student visitor" spiritual beings. This changed sometime in early 1925 with a "voluminous handwritten document," which from then on became the regular method of purported communication. The individual was never identified publicly but has been described as "a hard-boiled business man, member of the board of trade and stock exchange".

The Sadlers were both respected physicians, and William Sadler was a sometime debunker of paranormal claims. In 1929, he published a book called The Mind at Mischief, in which he explained the fraudulent methods of mediums and how self-deception leads to psychic claims. He wrote in an appendix that there were two cases that he had not explained to his satisfaction:

The other exception has to do with a rather peculiar case of psychic phenomena, one which I find myself unable to classify. ... I was brought in contact with it, in the summer of 1911, and I have had it under my observation more or less ever since, having been present at probably 250 of the night sessions, many of which have been attended by a stenographer who made voluminous notes. A thorough study of this case has convinced me that it is not one of ordinary trance. ... This man is utterly unconscious, wholly oblivious to what takes place, and, unless told about it subsequently, never knows that he has been used as a sort of clearing house for the coming and going of alleged extra-planetary personalities. ... Psychoanalysis, hypnotism, intensive comparison, fails to show that the written or spoken messages of this individual have origin in his own mind. Much of the material secured through this subject is quite contrary to his habits of thought, to the way in which he has been taught, and to his entire philosophy. In fact, of much that we have secured, we have failed to find anything of its nature in existence.

In 1923, a group of Sadler's friends, former patients, and colleagues began meeting for Sunday philosophical and religious discussions, but became interested in the strange communications when Sadler mentioned the case at their fourth meeting and read samples at their request. Shortly afterward, a communication reportedly was received that was intended to serve as the basis for questions from the group that would be answered by celestial beings through the "contact personality."

Sadler presented this development to the group, and they generated hundreds of questions without full seriousness, but their claim is that it resulted in the appearance of answers in the form of fully written papers. They became more impressed with the quality of the answers and continued to ask questions, until all papers now collected together as The Urantia Book were obtained. The group was known as the Forum, and was formalized in 1925 as a closed group of 30 members who pledged not to discuss the material with others. Over time, some participants left and others joined, leading to a total membership of 486 people over the years from diverse backgrounds and a mix of interest levels. (Note: One Forum member and early believer was the Arctic explorer Sir Hubert Wilkins, whose $1,000 check was the first money to go toward the book's publication costs.) A smaller group of five individuals called the Contact Commission, including the Sadlers, was responsible for gathering the questions from the Forum, acting as the custodians of the handwritten manuscripts that were presented as answers, and arranging for proofreading and typing of the material. Bill Sadler, Jr. is noted to have composed the table of contents that is published with the book.

The Sadlers and others involved, now all deceased, claimed that the papers of the book were physically materialized from 1925 until 1935 in a way that was not understood even by them, with the first two parts being completed in 1934 and the third and fourth in 1935. The last Forum gathering was in 1942.

After the last of Part IV was obtained in 1935, there was a period of time during which requests for clarification supposedly resulted in revisions from the celestials. Sadler and his son Bill at one point wrote a draft introduction but were told they could not use it. The Foreword was then "received."

The communications purportedly continued for another two decades while members of the Forum studied the book in depth, and according to Sadler and others, permission to publish it was given to them in 1955. The Urantia Foundation was formed in 1950 as a tax-exempt educational society in Illinois, and through privately raised funds, the book was published on 12 October 1955.

Only the members of the Contact Commission witnessed the activities of the "sleeping subject", and only they knew his identity. The individual is claimed to have been kept anonymous in order to prevent undesirable future veneration or reverence for him. Martin Gardner claims that an explanation concerning the origin of the book more plausible than celestial beings is that the Contact Commission, particularly William Sadler, was responsible. Gardner's conclusion is that a man named Wilfred Kellogg was the sleeping subject and authored the work from his subconscious mind, with William Sadler subsequently editing and authoring parts. Brad Gooch believes Sadler wrote the book, possibly with help from others on the Contact Commission. A statistical analysis, using the Mosteller and Wallace methods of stylometry, indicates at least nine authors were involved in the Urantia documents. Comparing Sadler's The Mind at Mischief to the Urantia documents does not indicate authorship or extensive editing of the latter by Sadler, without ruling out the possibility Sadler made limited edits or contributions.

Bunker and Pressler posit that the 'sleeping subject' was Edgar Cayce On another level, the Urantia Book itself credits midwayers in relaying material to the sleeping subject. 38:9.9, 121:0.1. 0:0.1 credits an "Orvonton corps of truth revealers" later detailed to include:

=== Copyright status ===
As of 2006, the Urantia Foundation has accepted that the international copyright on the English text has expired.

In 1991, Kristen Maaherra, after having compiled an index of The Urantia Book and distributed free copies via computer disk and printouts, was sued by the Urantia Foundation for violating their copyright on the book.

In 1995, Maaherra won a summary judgment declaring the Urantia Foundation's copyright renewal invalid. Upon appeal, the judgment was reversed and awarded to the Urantia Foundation.

In 1999, four years later, Harry McMullan III and the Michael Foundation published a book, Jesus–A New Revelation, which included verbatim 76 of the 196 papers included in The Urantia Book. McMullan and the Michael Foundation subsequently sought a legal declaration that the Urantia Foundation's US copyright in The Urantia Book was either invalid or, alternatively, that the copyright had not been infringed upon. Urantia Foundation's copyright was held to have expired in 1983 because the book was deemed to have been neither a composite work nor a commissioned work for hire. These two arguments having been rejected, a U.S. court held that, since the "sleeping subject" (whom the court referred to as "the Conduit") had died prior to 1983, only the Conduit's heirs would have been eligible to renew the copyright in 1983 and, since they had not done so, the Urantia Foundation's copyright on the book had expired and the book had therefore passed into the public domain. This decision was upheld on appeal.

== Overview ==
The Urantia Book is approximately 2,000 pages long, and consists of a body of 196 "papers," divided into four parts, and an introductory foreword:

- Part I, titled "The Central and Superuniverses," addresses what the authors consider the highest levels of creation, including the eternal and infinite "Universal Father," his Trinity associates, and the "Isle of Paradise."
- Part II, "The Local Universe," describes the origin, administration, and personalities of the local universe of "Nebadon," the part of the cosmos where Earth resides. It discusses the inhabitants of local universes and how the work of different orders of beings, including humans and angels, is coordinated within a scheme of ascension and spiritual progress.
- Part III, "The History of Urantia," presents a broad history of the Earth, offering an explanation of the origin, evolution, and destiny of the planet and its inhabitants. Topics include Adam and Eve, Melchizedek, the concept of the Thought Adjuster, "Religion in Human Experience," and "Personality Survival."
- Part IV, "The Life and Teachings of Jesus," is the largest part at 775 pages, and is often noted as the most accessible and most impressive. It narrates a detailed biography of Jesus that includes his childhood, teenage years, family life, and public ministry, as well as the events that led to his crucifixion, death, and resurrection. It continues by discussing his appearances after he rose, Pentecost and, finally, "The Faith of Jesus."

=== Nature of God ===
According to The Urantia Book, God is the creator and upholder of all reality—an omniscient, omnipresent, omnipotent, infinite, and eternal spirit personality. The most fundamental teaching about God in the book is that the human concept that most closely approximates the nature of God is that of a Father. Specifically, "the Father idea is [still] the highest human concept of God." It is also said that "the face which the Infinite turns toward all universe personalities is the face of a Father, the Universal Father of love."

God, according to the book, is one Deity who functions on a range of different levels of reality, both personal and impersonal. God is said to exist in a Trinity of three perfectly individualized persons who are co-equal: God the Father, God the Son, and God the Spirit. These persons are referred to by additional titles in the book, primarily as the "Universal Father," "Eternal Son," and "Infinite Spirit." While stating that the concept of one God in three persons is difficult to fully understand, the book says that the idea "in no manner violates the truth of the divine unity. The three personalities of Paradise Deity are, in all universe reality reactions and in all creature relations, as one."

The Father, Son, and Spirit are considered "existential" persons of Deity, those in existence from the eternal past to the eternal future. In addition, three persons of Deity are described who are "experiential," or incomplete and in the process of actualizing: God the Supreme; God the Ultimate; and God the Absolute. Of these three, God the Supreme, or "the Supreme Being," is given the most explanation, as the person of Deity evolving in time and space to unify finite reality and the infinite. The persons of God the Ultimate and God the Absolute are considered to be remote from the possibility of comprehension and are given significantly less explanation.

Many types of celestial beings are enumerated in the book; one of particular note is a joint "offspring" of the Universal Father and Eternal Son called a "Creator Son." A divine Creator Son is considered the highest personification of the Universal Father and Eternal Son that is possible for people to know and "is, to all practical intents and purposes, God." Jesus of Nazareth is identified as a Creator Son who incarnated on Earth, and the central theme of the book's section recounting his life and teachings is that the religion he preached is the highest known to the world.

The final paper states:

To "follow Jesus" means to personally share his religious faith and to enter into the spirit of the Master's life of unselfish service for man. One of the most important things in human living is to find out what Jesus believed, to discover his ideals, and to strive for the achievement of his exalted life purpose. Of all human knowledge, that which is of greatest value is to know the religious life of Jesus and how he lived it.

=== God and the individual ===
God is described as the Father of each individual, and through the direct gift of a fragment of his eternal spirit, called a Thought Adjuster, is said to be able to guide the individual toward an increased understanding of him. The Thought Adjuster is a central teaching of the book and is also referred to as a "Mystery Monitor" and "indwelling presence," as well as a "divine spark." The idea is compared within the book to the Hindu atman and the ancient Egyptian ka. In relation to biblical traditions, the Thought Adjuster is said to be the meaning behind the phrases "being made in God's image" and the "kingdom of God is within you":

The Adjuster is the mark of divinity, the presence of God. The "image of God" does not refer to physical likeness nor to the circumscribed limitations of material creature endowment but rather to the gift of the spirit presence of the Universal Father in the supernal bestowal of the Thought Adjusters upon the humble creatures of the universes.

Each person is said to receive one such fragment at the time of his or her first independent moral decision, on average around the age of five years and 10 months. The Adjuster then serves non-coercively as a divine partner in the mind of the individual for the rest of life, and to the extent that a person consents with their free will to want to find God, it leads the person toward more mature, spiritualized thinking. A person's Thought Adjuster is described as distinct from either the soul or the conscience. In The Urantia Book's teachings, the degree to which a human mind chooses to accept its Adjuster's guidance becomes the degree to which a person's soul "grows" and becomes a reality that can then survive death. The soul is in essence an embryonic spiritual development, one parental factor being the divine Adjuster and the other being the human will.

The book says: "But you yourself are mostly unconscious of this inner ministry. You are quite incapable of distinguishing the product of your own material intellect from that of the conjoint activities of your soul and the Adjuster." The book is strongly fideistic and teaches that neither science nor logic will ever be able to prove or disprove the existence of God, arguing that faith is necessary to become conscious of God's presence in human experience, the Thought Adjuster.

Persistently embracing sin is considered the same as rejecting the leadings of the Adjuster, rejecting the will of God. Constant selfishness and sinful choosing lead eventually to iniquity and full identification with unrighteousness, and since unrighteousness is unreal, it results in the eventual annihilation of the individual's identity. Personalities like this become "as if they never were." The book says that, "in the last analysis, such sin-identified individuals have destroyed themselves by becoming wholly unreal through their embrace of iniquity." The concepts of Hell and reincarnation are not taught.

The book says that a person ultimately is destined to fuse with his or her divine fragment and become one inseparable entity with it as the final goal of faith. Uniting with the Adjuster fragment is the "reward of the ages," the moment when a human personality has successfully and unalterably won eternal life, described as typically taking place in the afterlife, but also a possibility during earthly life. The result during human life is a "fusion flash," with the material body consumed in a fiery light and the soul "translated" to the afterlife. The Hebrew prophet Elijah being taken to heaven without death in "chariots of fire" is said to be a rare example in recorded history of a person who translated instead of experiencing death.

After a person fuses with his or her fragment of God, "then will begin your real life, the ascending life, to which your present mortal state is but the vestibule." A person continues as an ascending citizen in the universe and travels through numerous worlds on a long pilgrimage of growth and learning that eventually leads to God and residence on Paradise. Mortals who reach this stage are called "finaliters." The book goes on to discuss the potential destinies of these "glorified mortals."

The book regards human life on earth as a "short and intense test," and the afterlife as a continuation of training that begins in material life. The "religion of Jesus" is considered to be practiced by way of loving God the Father, thereby learning to love each person the way Jesus loves people; that is, recognizing the "fatherhood of God and its correlated truth, the brotherhood of man," resulting in unselfish service to others.

=== Cosmology ===
The book asserts that at the center of the cosmos is the stationary Isle of Paradise—the dwelling place of God—with Paradise being surrounded by "Havona," an eternal universe containing a billion perfect worlds, around which circle seven incomplete, developing "superuniverses."

The word "universe" in the book is used to denote a number of different scales of organization. A "superuniverse" is roughly the size of a galaxy or group of galaxies, and the seven superuniverses along with Paradise-Havona are together designated as the "grand universe." A "local universe" is a portion of a superuniverse, with 100,000 local universes composing each superuniverse. Beyond the seven superuniverses, uninhabited "outer space levels" are described. The term "master universe" refers to what in modern usage would be the total universe—all existing matter and space taken as a whole.

Urantia is said to be located in a remote local universe named "Nebadon," which itself is part of superuniverse number seven, "Orvonton." The physical size of a local universe is not directly stated, but each is said to have up to 10 million inhabited worlds.

=== History and future of the world ===
The book's extensive teachings about the history of the world include its physical development about 4.5 billion years ago, the gradual changes in conditions that allowed life to develop, and long ages of organic evolution that started with microscopic marine life and led to plant and animal life, initially in the oceans and later on land. The emergence of humans is presented as having occurred about a million years ago from a branch of superior primates originating from a lemur ancestor. The first humans are said to have been male and female twins called Andon and Fonta, born "993,419 years prior to 1934."

The Urantia Book teaches not only biological evolution, but that human society and spiritual understandings similarly "evolve" by slow progression, subject both to periods of rapid improvement and the possibility of retrogression. Progress is said to follow a divine plan that includes periodic gifts of revelation and ministry by heavenly teachers, which eventually will lead to an ideal world status of "light and life" in the far distant future.

Although there is the ideal and divine plan of progression, it is said to be fostered and administered by various orders of celestial beings who are not always perfect. Urantia is said to be a markedly "confused and disordered" planet that is "greatly retarded in all phases of intellectual progress and spiritual attainment" compared to more typical inhabited worlds, due to an unusually severe history of rebellion and default by its spiritual supervisors.

== Comparisons ==
=== Comparison to Christianity ===
More than one third of the content of The Urantia Book is devoted to a narrative of the life and teachings of Jesus, and the Judeo-Christian tradition is given an importance exceeding any other. The book's teachings claim to be a clarification and expansion of Jesus’s teaching. However, numerous differences are noted between its teachings and commonly accepted Christian doctrines.

Jesus is held in high regard by The Urantia Book, as he is in the New Testament of the Bible. The following are attributed to him in both texts:

- He was both human and divine, the Son of God incarnate who was born to Mary, whose husband was Joseph.
- He performed many of the miracles described in the Bible, such as the resurrection of Lazarus, the turning of water into wine, the feeding of the five thousand, and numerous healings of the blind, diseased, and infirm.
- He taught twelve apostles, [they were disciples or students. Paul was an apostle] most of whom went on to spread his teachings.
- He was crucified, and on the third day after his death, rose from the dead.
- He will return to the world again some day.

Some differences with Christianity include:

- Jesus' crucifixion is not considered an atonement for the sins of humanity. The crucifixion is taught to be an outcome of the fears of religious leaders of the day, who regarded his teachings as a threat to their positions of authority.
- Jesus is considered the human incarnation of "Michael of Nebadon," one of more than 700,000 "Paradise Sons" of God, or "Creator Sons." Jesus is not considered the second person of the Trinity as he is in Christianity. The book refers to the Eternal Son as the second person of the Trinity.
- Jesus was born on Earth through natural means of conception instead of a virgin birth.
- Some of the miracles described in the Bible Jesus did not perform, for example walking on water.

=== Comparison to Seventh-day Adventism ===
Gardner notes similarities between Seventh-day Adventism and the teachings of The Urantia Book, and sees this as evidence that William Sadler and Wilfred Kellogg had a role in editing or writing the book, since they both were one-time believers in Adventism. For instance, two basic Adventist beliefs that distinguish it from mainline Christianity are the doctrines of soul sleeping and annihilationism, both of which The Urantia Book also supports. Lewis notes that from the perspective of the book being a "revelation," it could be claimed the "celestial beings" simply found areas of Adventist belief to be accurate and therefore presented and expanded on them. While the book supports aspects of Adventism, it also is mixed with teachings that are heresies to Adventists.

=== Other comparisons ===
The book can be seen as belonging in the genre of spiritual literature that includes A Course in Miracles and Conversations with God. Gardner compares it with Oahspe, noting that though Oahspe is "vastly inferior to the UB both in ideas and style of writing," they are similar in claiming to have been written by celestial beings channelled through a human conduit, teaching that there is "one ultimate God who oversees a vast bureaucracy of lesser deities" while both outline an elaborate cosmology. The book's claimed supernatural origin has been compared to similar claims of the Book of Mormon, Science and Health, the Quran, and the Bible, with belief in it not being seen as necessarily a greater leap in reason.

Incorporated in the book itself are comparisons with facets of various world religions including Buddhism, Islam, Taoism, Judaism, Hinduism, Shinto, and Confucianism. For example, Paper 131, "The World's Religions" discusses the aspects of these religions that are in common with what the book claims is the "religion of Jesus." The stance of the book is that "There is not a Urantia religion that could not profitably study and assimilate the best of the truths contained in every other faith, for all contain truth."

== Consideration as literature ==
The Urantia Book has been enjoyed by some as a form of science fiction, historical fiction, or fantasy. The Urantia Book is noted for its high level of internal consistency and an advanced writing style. Skeptic Martin Gardner, in a book otherwise highly critical of The Urantia Book, writes that it is "highly imaginative" and that the "cosmology outrivals in fantasy the cosmology of any science-fiction work known to me." Gooch says that for nonbelievers, the book is a mixture of being "fascinating, inspiring, compelling, haunting, entertaining, annoying, incomprehensible, and always wordy."

Parts I, II, and III are chiefly written in expository language. The papers are informational, matter-of-fact, and instructional. Part IV of the book is written as a biography of Jesus' life, and some feel it is a rich narrative with well-developed characters, high attention to detail, woven sub-plots, and realistic dialogue. Considered as literature, Part IV is favorably compared to retellings of Jesus' life, such as The Gospel According to Jesus Christ by José Saramago and Behold the Man by Michael Moorcock. Martin Gardner considers Part IV to be an especially "well-written, impressive work," and says, "Either it is accurate in its history, coming directly from higher beings in position to know, or it is a work of fertile imagination by someone who knew the New Testament by heart and who was also steeped in knowledge of the times when Jesus lived."

== Critical views ==
=== Criticisms of claims as a revelation ===
The authors refer to the book as the fifth revelation of "epochal significance" to humankind, the fourth epochal revelation having been the life of Jesus. The assertion in The Urantia Book that it constitutes "the most recent presentation of truth to the mortals of Urantia" has been criticized as a product of "human efforts." Because the book asserts certain tenets of Christianity, such as the atonement doctrine, are of human origin, while presenting a great deal more of Jesus' life not recorded in any versions of the Bible, others with a Christian viewpoint have argued it cannot be genuine. Gooch notes that while its "somewhat dated, elegant" prose could be read as fiction, due to its claim of divine revelation "the book invites reactions far more scathing than [it] ... might otherwise merit."

=== Criticism of its science ===
In Paper 101, "The Real Nature of Religion," the authors write:

We full well know that, while the historic facts and religious truths of this series of revelatory presentations will stand on the records of the ages to come, within a few short years many of our statements regarding the physical sciences will stand in need of revision in consequence of additional scientific developments and new discoveries. These new developments we even now foresee, but we are forbidden to include such humanly undiscovered facts in the revelatory records. Let it be made clear that revelations are not necessarily inspired. The cosmology of these revelations is not inspired.

As pointed out by skeptic Martin Gardner, the science in The Urantia Book reflects some views that prevailed at the time the book originated. The claim by the authors that no unknown scientific discoveries could be imparted can function as a ruse to allow mistakes to be dismissed later. The appeal to consequence that post-1955 scientific knowledge is not being presented is consistent with a book written by humans in the 1950s instead of celestial beings with superior knowledge.

Examples of criticisms regarding the science in The Urantia Book include:

- The described formation of the Solar System is consistent with the Chamberlin-Moulton planetesimal hypothesis, which though popular in the early part of the 20th century, was discarded by the 1940s after major flaws were noted. The currently accepted scientific explanation for the origin of the Solar System is based on the nebular hypothesis.
- According to the book's descriptions, the universe is hundreds of billions of years old and periodically expands and contracts—"respires"— at 2-billion-year intervals. Recent observations measure the true age of the universe to be 13.8 billion years. The book does not support the Big Bang theory.
- A fundamental particle called an "ultimaton" is proposed, with an electron being composed of 100 ultimatons. The particle is not known to be described anywhere else and the concept is at odds with modern particle physics.
- The Andromeda Galaxy is claimed to be "almost one million" light years away, repeating a systematic mistake in the measurements of the distance to galaxies made in the 1920s. The galaxy is now known to be 2.5 million light years away.
- The book repeats the mistaken idea that planets close to a sun will gradually spin slower until one hemisphere is left always turned to the sun due to tidal locking, citing Mercury as an example. Scientists at the time of the book's origin thought one side of Mercury always faced the Sun, just as one side of the Moon always faces the Earth. In 1965, radio astronomers discovered however that Mercury rotates fast enough for all sides to see exposure to the Sun. Scientists further established that Mercury is locked in this spin rate in a stable resonance of 3 spins for every 2 orbits, and it is not slowing and so will never have one side left always turned to the Sun.
- Some species are said to have evolved suddenly from single mutations without transitional species. The theory originated with Dutch botanist Hugo De Vries but was short-lived and is not now supported.
- The book erroneously stated that a solar eclipse was predicted in 1808 by the Native American prophet Tenskwatawa. The eclipse actually was predicted in late April 1806 and occurred on June 16, 1806. In 2009, the Urantia Foundation acknowledged the error and revised the book. (Note: Per text standardization performed by Urantia Foundation to reconcile changes made to the text since 1955 and fix other errors they considered to be typos.)
- Controversial statements about human races can be found in the book. Gardner recounts that William S. Sadler also wrote eugenicist works that contain similar arguments to some ideas presented in The Urantia Book.

While some adherents of the book believe that all of the information in The Urantia Book including its science is literally true, others believe the science is not fully accurate. For example, Meredith Sprunger, a believer in The Urantia Book and retired minister of the United Church of Christ, wrote that research "has revealed that virtually all of the scientific material found in the UB was the accepted scientific knowledge of the period in which the book was written, was held by some scientists of that time, or was about to be discovered or recognized." He further argued against its literal infallibility and said that fundamentalism over the book is "just as untenable as Biblical fundamentalism."

Other believers maintain that the book has prophetically anticipated scientific advances. They believe more of its science—if not all of it—will be proven correct in the future. Gardner evaluated many of these claims as of 1995 and argued that they were fairly unconvincing. Because the book is said to have been written by the revelators by 1935 but not published until 1955, discoveries from science during the two intervening decades are often declared to be prophetic by believers, while skeptics point out that edits could have been made to the book up to its 1955 publication. For instance, the catalytic role that carbon plays in the sun's nuclear reactions is described in the book, and Hans Bethe's announcement of the discovery was made in 1938.

The only apparent anticipation of science the book has made, in Gardner's opinion, is that it says the magnetic sense that homing pigeons possess is "not wholly wanting as a conscious possession by mankind." In 1980, a British zoologist, Robin Baker, published evidence that humans have a limited magnetic sense.

Mark McMenamin, a professor of geology, quotes a section of the book describing a billion-year-old supercontinent that subsequently split apart, forming ocean basins where early marine life developed. He says, "This amazing passage, written in the 1930s, anticipates scientific results that did not actually appear in the scientific literature until many decades later." McMenamin also states, "Of course I am being selective here in my choice of quotations, and there are reams of scientifically untenable material in The Urantia Book."

=== Use of other published material without attribution ===
The Urantia Book states in its Foreword that more than one thousand "human concepts representing the highest and most advanced planetary knowledge of spiritual values and universe meanings" were selected in preparing the papers. The authors say that they were required to "give preference to the highest existing human concepts pertaining to the subjects to be presented" and would "resort to pure revelation only when the concept of presentation has had no adequate previous expression by the human mind." One of the authors wrote in Part IV: "I well know that those concepts which have had origin in the human mind will prove more acceptable and helpful to all other human minds."

In recent years, students of the papers have found that the free use of other sources appears to be true. None of the material allegedly used from other sources is directly cited or referenced within the book.

In 1992, a reader of The Urantia Book, Matthew Block, self-published a paper that showed The Urantia Book utilized material from 15 other books. All of the source authors identified in Block's paper were published in English between 1905 and 1943 by U.S. publishers and are typically scholarly or academic works that contain concepts and wording similar to what is found in The Urantia Book. Block has since claimed to have discovered over 125 source texts that were incorporated into the papers.

The use of outside source materials was studied separately by Gardner and by Gooch. Consistent with the belief of each that the book's author(s) must have been human, they conclude that the book plagiarized many of the sources noted by Block.

For instance, Gardner and Block note that Paper 85 appears to have been taken from the first eight chapters of Origin and Evolution of Religion by Edward Washburn Hopkins, published by Yale University Press in 1923. Each section of the paper corresponds to a chapter in the book, with several passages possibly used as direct material and further material used in Papers 86-90 and 92. (In addition to the book's "heavy indebtedness to Hopkins," Gardner discovered that Hopkins was a major reference in an earlier book authored by Sadler, adding to Gardner's view that it is more likely Sadler had a hand in writing or editing The Urantia Book than that celestial beings wrote it.) Likewise, much of The Urantia Book material relating to the evolution of mankind appears to have been directly taken from Henry Fairfield Osborn, Man Rises to Parnassus: Critical Epochs in the Prehistory of Man published by Princeton University Press in 1928.

In one example cited by Block and confirmed by Gardner and Gooch, the original author discusses the periodicity of the chemical elements and concludes that the harmony in the construction of the atom suggests some unspecified plan of organization. The authors of The Urantia Book assert that this harmony is evidence of the intelligent design of the universe. W. F. G. Swann writes on page 64 of The Architecture of the Universe (italics indicate edits as compared to The Urantia Book, bolding indicates deletions):

Starting from any one of them [i.e., chemical elements], and noting some property such as the melting point, for example, the property would change as we went along the row, but as we continued it would gradually come back to the condition very similar to that which we started ... The eighth element was in many respects like the first, the ninth like the second, the tenth like the third, and so on. Such a slate of affairs point[s] not only to a varied internal structure, but also to a certain harmony in that variation suggestive of some organized plan in building the atom.

Contrast with The Urantia Book's version:

Starting from any one element, after noting some one property, such a quality will change for six consecutive elements, but on reaching the eighth, it tends to reappear, that is, the eighth chemically active element resembles the first, the ninth the second, and so on. Such a fact of the physical world unmistakably points to the sevenfold constitution of ancestral energy and is indicative of the fundamental reality of the sevenfold diversity of the creations of time and space.

Block and other believers do not see the use of the source materials as plagiarism, but express a view instead that the quality of the way the material was borrowed is consistent with authorship by celestial beings and that study of the sources leads to an even deeper understanding of The Urantia Book. Gooch, a professor of English, assessed that the use of the sources "does reveal to us an author with a busy genius for metaphysical invention and poetic turns of phrase whose scam was at worst benign and at most visionary." Asked by Gardner what he thought of these plagiarisms, Sprunger responded in a letter by saying that if humans wrote the book the plagiarisms would indeed be disturbing but not if it was written by supermortals.

== Influence ==
=== Adherents ===
It is difficult to gauge how many adherents there may be as there are multiple organizations to census. Informal study groups "tend to sprout, ripen, then vanish or splinter" and have not been counted reliably. Readers sometimes join study groups after reading on their own for years or decades, others join them soon after developing an interest in the book, while "for most, worship remains as individual as the act of reading." Disagreements over the legal ownership of the book, its interpretation, and the reception of new revelations have led to some splintering, though these disagreements appear to have been settled to the satisfaction of most adherents. The movement generally incorporates a nonsectarian view, contending that individuals with different religious backgrounds can receive the book's teachings as an enrichment rather than as a contradiction of their faiths.

The movement inspired by The Urantia Book has not developed clergy or institutions such as churches, or temples.

Sarah Lewis notes that, "The Urantia Revelation is not securing legitimacy through historically known and accepted means to any great degree, nor is it even using common language that would increase the likelihood of understanding and therefore acceptance. It introduces new concepts and a new language, and this does not make acceptance any easier." She assesses that the movement is uncontroversial compared to other ones, "lacking the zealous proselytizing found within many other groups," and that it is therefore likely to remain small and unaffected by opposing views.

Urantia Foundation advocated a "slow growth" policy in the past and had not significantly marketed the book. Sales by Urantia Foundation went from 7,000 in 1990 to 24,700 in 1997, and steadily increased to nearly 38,000 in 2000, an "upturn that seems to represent a genuine trend rather than just some spike on a sales chart," but in 2011 Urantia Foundation reported worldwide annual sales of 16,000 copies and over 60,000 downloads from various sites. Since the book was determined to be in the public domain in 2001, other organizations, such as The Urantia Book Fellowship under the publishing name Uversa Press, have also published the book. Copies of The Urantia Book are on the Internet in various formats and it has been adapted to more recent platforms such as the Kindle and the iOS App Store. Several audio books of the text are also on the Internet.

The International Urantia Association had twenty-six reader associations worldwide as of 2002, and The Urantia Book Fellowship (formerly the Urantia Brotherhood, founded in 1955 with Urantia Foundation as the original social fraternal organization of believers) claimed roughly twelve hundred official members, with the highest concentrations in the West of the United States and the Sun Belt, especially California, Colorado, Florida, and Texas. It appears an increasing number of people are forming study groups, participating in Internet discussion groups, and hosting or visiting websites about it.

=== Independent channelers ===
The Teaching Mission is a group of Urantia channellers. According to Richard Landes, "The foundation considers them self-deluded, but they have created a schism that continues to disrupt the movement."

Vern Grimsley (1940-2012) was a preacher who founded a Urantian outreach organization called Family of God in the 1970s, which was initially supported by others in the movement, including the Urantia Foundation. Beginning in the early 1980s, Grimsley claimed he heard voices that were from the same higher beings who wrote The Urantia Book, and that the voices warned of an impending world war followed by a nuclear holocaust. While some in the movement believed him, others including the Urantia Foundation concluded Grimsley's messages were spurious, former friends eventually began to shun him, and in later years he is said to have lived in obscurity.

=== In popular culture ===
- Singer songwriter Danny O'Keefe released a song titled 'Shooting Star' in the 1973 album O'Keefe, which contains the line "Urantia is rising in the distance / The Adjuster is waiting in the dawn", a reference to The Urantia Book
- In 1975, the band Spirit included the song "Urantia" on their Spirit of '76 album. The piece was co-written by guitarist Randy California, who had been "immersed in the Urantia Foundation" for a few years at that point.
- The jazz fusion band Weather Report have a song entitled 'Havona' on their 1977 studio album Heavy Weather. 'Havona' is the last track on the respective studio album on side two and was composed by bassist Jaco Pastorius (1951–1987) as a reference to a term (i.e. The Paradise-Havona System) which appears in The Urantia Book.
- Karlheinz Stockhausen (1928–2007) based his seven-opera cycle Licht on the cosmology of The Urantia Book.
- Stevie Ray Vaughan (1954–1990), American blues rock guitarist: "Stevie often brought along the book of Urantia and read Lindi passages from the strange publication."
- Jimi Hendrix (1942–1970): "Jimi also had with him the Book of Urantia, an alternative Bible... Jimi carried this book with him everywhere--along with his Bob Dylan songbook--and told friends he had learned much from its pages."
- Jerry Garcia (1942–1995) of Grateful Dead was a reader of The Urantia Book and claimed it was "one of his favorite esoteric works"
- Kerry Livgren (1949–present) of Kansas is quoted as saying, "In 1977, I discovered a book that convinced me I had reached the end of my quest. It was called The Urantia Book ...."
- American guitarist Steve Vai (1960–present) composed and released a song entitled 'Midway Creatures' (from his seventh studio album Real Illusions: Reflections) which is a term that also appears in The Urantia Book, more specifically in Paper 77.
- American alternative metal band Deftones' ninth album, Ohms (album), features a track named Urantia.
- American synth-metal band Deadsy's song "The Mansion World" from their 2002 album Commencement (album) has many references to themes in The Urantia Book.

== Symbols ==
The symbol of Paradise Trinity as described within The Urantia Book.

An important symbol, described in The Urantia Book as "the banner of Michael" and the "material emblem of the Trinity government of all creation," consists of three azure blue concentric circles on a white background. The circles are said to be "emblematic of the infinity, eternity, and universality of the Paradise Trinity".

It has been claimed that the incarnated priest and contemporary of Abraham, Machiventa Melchizedek, wore on his breast an emblem of three concentric circles representative of the Paradise Trinity. During a system-wide rebellion instigated by Lucifer, the so-called "war in heaven," Lucifer's emblem was a banner of white bearing one red circle with a solid black circle at its center.

== See also ==
- New religious movement
- Oahspe: A New Bible
- Urantia Foundation

== Bibliography ==
Books

- Bedell, Clyde (1987), Concordex of the Urantia Book, Good Cheer Press, ISBN 978-0-916014-75-9
- Gardner, Martin (1995), Urantia: The Great Cult Mystery, Prometheus Books, ISBN 978-1-59102-622-8
- Godwin, Joscelyn (1998), "Chapter 17: Stockhausen's Donnerstag Aus Licht and Gnosticism", in Hanegraaff, Wouter; van den Broek, Roelof (eds.), Gnosis and Hermeticism from Antiquity to Modern Times, SUNY Press, pp. 347–358, ISBN 978-0-7914-3611-0
- Gooch, Brad (2002), Godtalk: Travels in Spiritual America, A.A. Knopf, ISBN 978-0-679-44709-2
- Gray, Patrick (2016), "Chapter 7. Jesus vs Paul: Spiritual but Not Religious?", Paul as a Problem in History and Culture, Baker Academic, ISBN 9780801048838
- House, H. Wayne (2000), Charts of Cults, Sects, and Religious Movements, Zondervan, ISBN 0-310-38551-2
- Johnson, J.J. (2025), Exploring the Urantia Revelation: Bridging Science and Spirit with the Truth of Reality, Skyhorse Publishing, ISBN 9781510785434
- Lewis, Sarah (2003), Partridge, Christopher (ed.), UFO Religions, Psychology Press, ISBN 978-0-415-26324-5
- Lewis, Sarah (2007), "Chapter 10: The Peculiar Sleep: Receiving The Urantia Book", in Lewis, James R.; Hammer, Olav (eds.), The Invention of Sacred Tradition, Cambridge University Press, pp. 199–212, ISBN 978-0-521-86479-4
- Mather, George A.; Nichols, Larry A. (1993), Dictionary of Cults, Sects, Religions and the Occult., Zondervan, ISBN 0-310-53100-4
- The Urantia Book, Urantia Foundation, 1955, ISBN 0-911560-02-5

Journal articles

- Correia, Alexandre C.M. (2004), "Mercury's capture into the 3/2 spin-orbit resonance as a result of its chaotic dynamics", Nature, 429 (6994): 848–850, Bibcode:2004Natur.429..848C, doi:10.1038/nature02609, PMID 15215857, S2CID 9289925
- Cotter, Thomas F. (2003), "Gutenberg's legacy: Copyright, censorship, and religious pluralism", California Law Review, 91 (2): 323–392, doi:10.2307/3481334, JSTOR 3481334
