= American Medical Missionary College =

American Medical Missionary College was a private Seventh-day Adventist college in Battle Creek, Michigan. It grew out of classes offered at the Battle Creek Sanitarium. It existed from 1895 until 1910, with preclinical instruction in Battle Creek and further clinical training in Chicago, Illinois. In the latter year it was merged with the College of Physicians and Surgeons of Chicago (P&S), which in turn became the University of Illinois College of Medicine on March 6, 1913.

== Philosophy and objectives ==
Education of medical missionaries

"The American Medical Missionary College, with a full and thorough course of study in medicine and a corps of efficient instructors, and being incorporated under the laws of Illinois, prepared to issue diplomas to those who should satisfactorily complete the course, was the first medical missionary college established, and, as far as we know, is the only one at present in existence which has exclusively for its purpose the education of medical missionaries, unless Dr. Valentine's medical school in North India may be an exception..."

Free tuition

"By action of the Sanitarium board, it was agreed that if the physicians employed in the Sanitarium would undertake to fill the position of professors, without salaries, the board would undertake to meet the incidental running expenses, so as to make the school a free school for all who were ready to devote their lives to the relief of suffering humanity, and to the propagation of the principles of the greater gospel, which offers salvation for the body as well as for the soul."

Non-sectarian

Kellogg intended for the American Medical Missionary College to be non-sectarian in its teaching and clinical work. This meant that the distinctive Seventh-day Adventist doctrinal views would not be promoted at the institution. Others, in Adventist leadership, strongly disagreed with Dr. Kellogg on this (citation to be added.) In 1897, Dr. Kellogg described the AMMC's philosophy:

"The institution, although Christian, is not sectarian, but is intensely evangelical. Sectarian doctrines are not included in its curriculum, and the benefits of its work are not confined within denominational lines."

== History ==
=== The movement to train medical missionaries before 1885 ===
Common Features of Medical Missionary Societies: They focused on sending out properly trained Christian medical doctors to serve as missionaries. They provided accommodation and financing for students as they worked on their medical education. They held a high standard of Christian commitment for their students.

The Edinburgh Medical Missionary Society In 1841, a group of doctors formed the Edinburgh Association for Sending Medical Aid to Foreign Countries to 'circulate information on medical mission; help other institutions engaged in the same work and assist as many Missionary stations as their funds would permit.' The name of the association was changed in 1843 to the Edinburgh Medical Missionary Society – a name which lasted until 2002 when it was split into two separate Charities - EMMS International and The Nazareth Trust."

On August 12, 1875, The Christian, a weekly periodical, in a section entitled 'Medical Missions' reported a growing interest in medical mission work. At a recent Mildmay Conference they reported on a speech by Dr. Saunders, of the London Medical Mission. In his opening remarks Saunders spoke of the ready access a medical missionary has to classes from which the clergyman and other evangelistic labourers are ordinarily excluded. Saunders said that people from Birmingham, Liverpool, Paris, Madrid, and Eastern Africa all have requested the help of medical missionaries. The Christian also reported on a talk given by Mr. Meacham, Superintendent of the Medical Mission in Manchester, England. Meacham said that medical missionaries were able to go down into the deeper depths of sin and misery than other people could. Their medical knowledge gave them insight into the spiritual state of their patients. This allowed them to win confidence and awaken conviction, and then to lead them to become Christians.

Another speaker at the same conference, Rev. J. Lowe, Superintendent of the Medical Mission Training Institute, Edinburgh, told of his work in Travancore. When in India himself, he would see as many as 200 at a time on the verandah of his bungalow. He said that in the waiting room of the Mission Medical Dispensary, caste broke down. The Brahman, Sudra, and Pariah, the worshipper of Brahma, Siva, and Vishnu, the Protestant and the Roman Catholic, all stand together, side by side, listening to the medical missionaries tell the stories of Jesus.

In Edinburgh fifty young men had been trained for medical mission work. They had been sent out by various missionary societies. It was proposed that a Livingstone Medical Mission Memorial should be erected in Edinburgh, in the form of a training institute.

The New York Medical Missionary Society

"THE WORK OF THE NEW YORK MEDICAL MISSIONARY SOCIETY.

"We have received a courteous letter from Dr. George D. Dowkontt, of this city, Medical Superintendent of the New York Medical Missionary "Home and Institute," regarding the subject of "specially trained medical missionaries," to which we referred in our issue of March 6. Dr. Dowkontt pleads the cause of the specially educated medical missionary. The great need of medical and surgical aid in heathen lands, and the great missionary value of such aid, are referred to, while the scarcity of men both willing and fitted to go is insisted upon. It was for these reasons that the Edinburgh Medical Missionary Society was founded in 1841, and the New York Medical Missionary Society in 1881. The peculiar need for the existence of the latter society, we are told, lies in the fact that medical missionaries must be particularly well educated medically, and American medical colleges are not good enough, and do not furnish sufficient training. Our correspondent adds:

" 'Allow me to say, in conclusion, that there is great force in the suggestion you made, that we could well spare two thousand out of the four thousand physicians annually graduated in America; and this is forcibly shown in the fact that while in 1880 there was one doctor to 585 people in the United States, there was only one medical missionary to nearly ten million of the heathen.

" 'You observe that these could well be spared to go forth and disseminate the gospel. Would to God they were able and willing so to do, then we need not exist; but they must first possess this gospel in their own hearts and lives to be able to disseminate it, and they must further be actuated by the spirit of self-denial which characterized the Great Physician for body and soul, the Lord Jesus Christ, before they will be willing to do so.

" 'Thank God for the noble men of our profession who have gone forth to heathen lands, as Scudder to India, Parker to China, Livingstone to Africa, and Post to Syria, but oh! for more such men who are willing rather to live to give, than to get.

" 'At the same time, I would not overlook the good work done by Christian physicians at home, work seldom recognized at its full worth, such as our late President, Dr. Alfred C. Post, and others."

Dr. George D. Dowkontt

Dr. George D. Dowkontt established the New York Medical Missionary Society and then the International Medical Missionary Society. These societies provided housing and financial sponsorships for medical students attending medical school. The purpose was to send out medical doctors as trained missionaries to serve anywhere in the world. Dr. Kellogg's similar efforts with students from the Sanitarium suggest that he was aware of Dr. Dowkontt's enterprise. Later, Dr. Dowkontt managed Kellogg's American Medical Missionary College. The Dowkontt's promotion of non-denominational mission work seems to have influenced Dr. Kellogg to do the same. (Citation to be added)

=== 1885 - 1895 ===
1890, The Sanitarium Medical Missionary School

In November 1891, Good Health reported: "THE Sanitarium Medical Missionary School for the training of young men and women to act as missionary canvassers, teachers of cooking-schools, physical culture, lecturers on hygiene, and in similar lines of work, opened November 2, with nearly fifty students, a much larger number than has appeared at the opening on any previous occasion. The eminently practical character of the instruction given in the school, and the success with which the efforts of those who have taken the course of instruction in the two previous sessions have been attended, have developed an increasing interest in the work of this educational institution. It is very satisfactory to know that those who are taking the course the present year, are all, without exception, prepared to devote their whole energies to the work as soon as they have acquired a proper preparation for it."

In 1891, Dr. John Harvey Kellogg arranged for qualified students connected to the Battle Creek Sanitarium to take medical training at the University of Michigan Medical School in Ann Arbor, Michigan. He provided these sponsored students with a residence home under the care of D. H. and Lauretta E. Kress.

"THE editor (J. H. Kellogg) recently visited the Sanitarium Medical Class at Ann Arbor. He found there a happy family of medical students, numbering nearly twenty, all enjojing good health, evidently prospering in their studies, and enjoying greatly the opportunities for preparing themselves for future usefulness. The friends of sanitary reform have great expectations respecting the young men and women who constitute this class, and when their course of study is completed, they will be warmly welcomed to the ranks of workers in the cause of sanitary and hygienic reform, which is very badly in need of recruits. "

The Agra Medical Missionary Training Institute under the leadership of Dr. Colin S. Valentine provided similar accommodations for native students in Agra, India. In 1886, Dr. P.T. Wilson wrote: "For more than three years I have had charge of the Agra Medical Missionary Training Institution, which simply gives a Christian home to native Christian young men who come to Agra to pursue a course in the Government Agra Medical School. At present we have ten students who avail themselves of this home. During the past year the Edinburgh Medical Missionary Society has taken over this Institution and Rev. Dr. Colin S. Valentine is expected to return from furlough and assume charge in the autumn."

=== 1895 - 1902 ===
The Illinois legislature granted a charter to The American Medical Missionary College in 1895. The American Medical Missionary College taught students both in Battle Creek and in Chicago. The Chicago education took place in conjunction with the Chicago Medical Mission.

=== 1903 - 1910 ===
Dr. Kellogg and the Seventh-day Adventist Church experienced serious difficulties with each other. Kellogg was no longer a member of the church after 1907. After Battle Creek College moved to Berrien Springs in 1901/1902, many Seventh-day Adventists stopped sending their young people to Battle Creek for an education. The lack of Seventh-day Adventist support affected both the attendance and the financial support for the college. The AMMC declined in enrollment and developed significant debts.

Yet, in 1908, the following news item appeared in the November issue of the Missionary Review of the World. The Review and Herald presented it as a news quote:

" 'The Battle Creek Sanitarium, with which this college [the American Medical Missionary College] under Dr. George D. Dowkontt (See New York Medical Missionary Society quote above.) is connected, has severed its connection with the Seventh-day Adventists, and Dr. Kellogg is no longer a member of that body. Last year four students were graduated, but already this year the college has begun with forty students, including Presbyterians, Methodists, Baptists, Congregationalists, Episcopalians, and others. ' "

== Notable alumni ==
- Lottie Isbell Blake
- Henry Harrower
- William S. Sadler
- Lena Sadler
- Māui Pōmare
