= Lena Sadler =

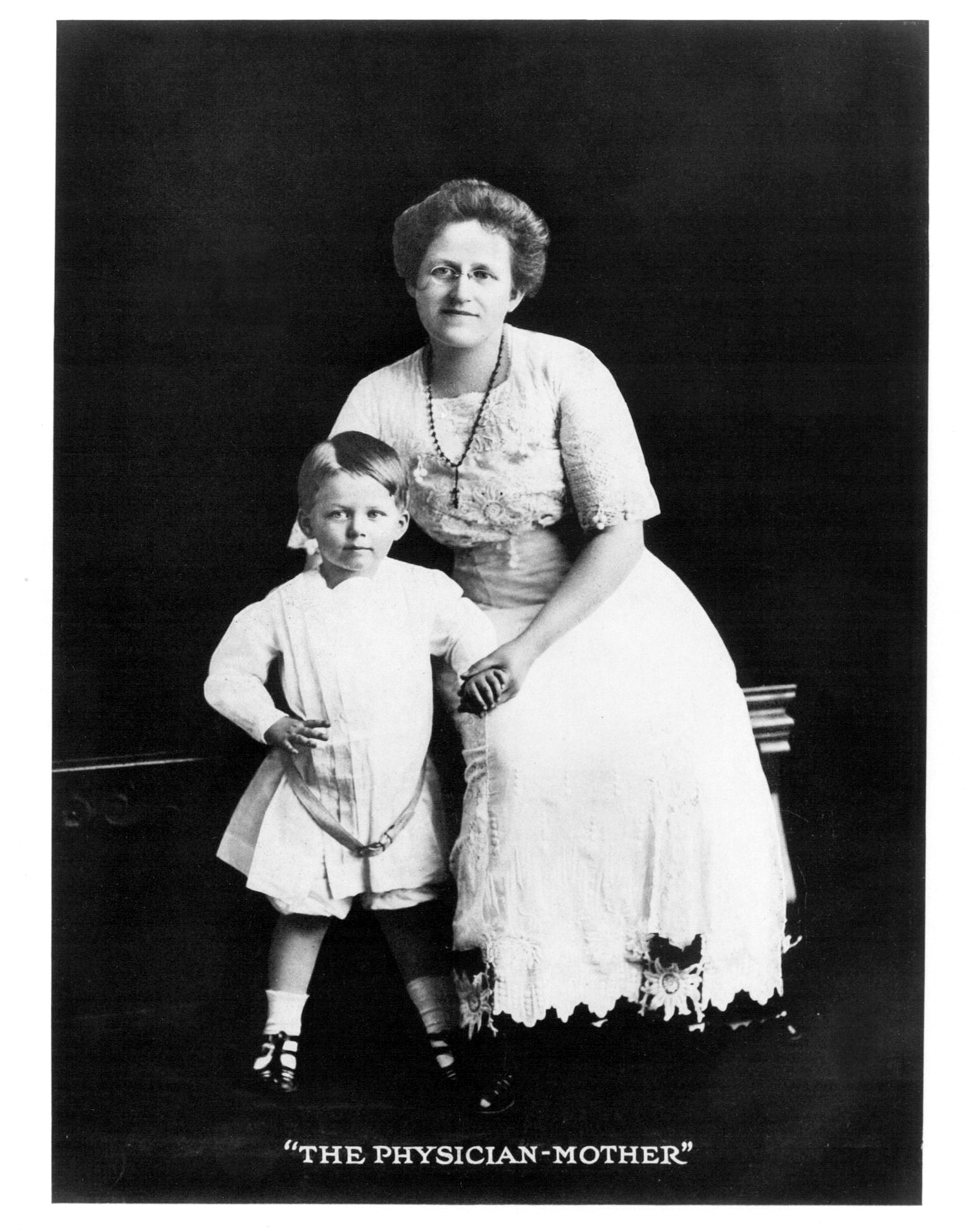
- Born: Lena Celestia Kellogg; June 9, 1875; Calhoun County, Michigan, U.S.
- Died: August 8, 1939 (aged 64); Chicago, Illinois, U.S.
- Occupation: Obstetrician
- Spouse: William S. Sadler (m. 1897)

Lena Kellogg Sadler (June 9, 1875 – August 8, 1939) was an American physician, surgeon, obstetrician, and eugenicist who was a leader in women's health issues.

== Early years ==
Lena Kellogg was born in Wet Prairie, Calhoun County, Michigan, on June 9, 1875.

== Accomplishments ==
She was an attending obstetrician at Columbus Hospital and Children's Memorial Hospital, a Fellow of the American College of Surgeons, American Medical Association, Medical Women's International Association, Associate Director, Chicago Institute of Research & Diagnosis; one of the founders of the American Medical Women's Association, (President 1934, Secretary 1925–1926), Illinois Federation of Women's Clubs (Chairman of Child Welfare 1925), State of Illinois Department of Public Health and Child Welfare (Chairman 1926), Chicago Council of Medical Women (President 1929, 1930, Secretary 1924–1925), Chicago Medical Society, Illinois State Medical Society, Chicago Medical Women's Club, Chicago Woman's Club, Chicago Chpt of the American Federation of Soroptimists and the Lakeview Women's Club.

== Education and personal life ==
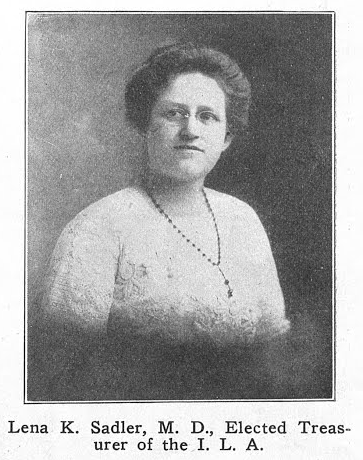
Lena K. Sadler, from a 1913 publication

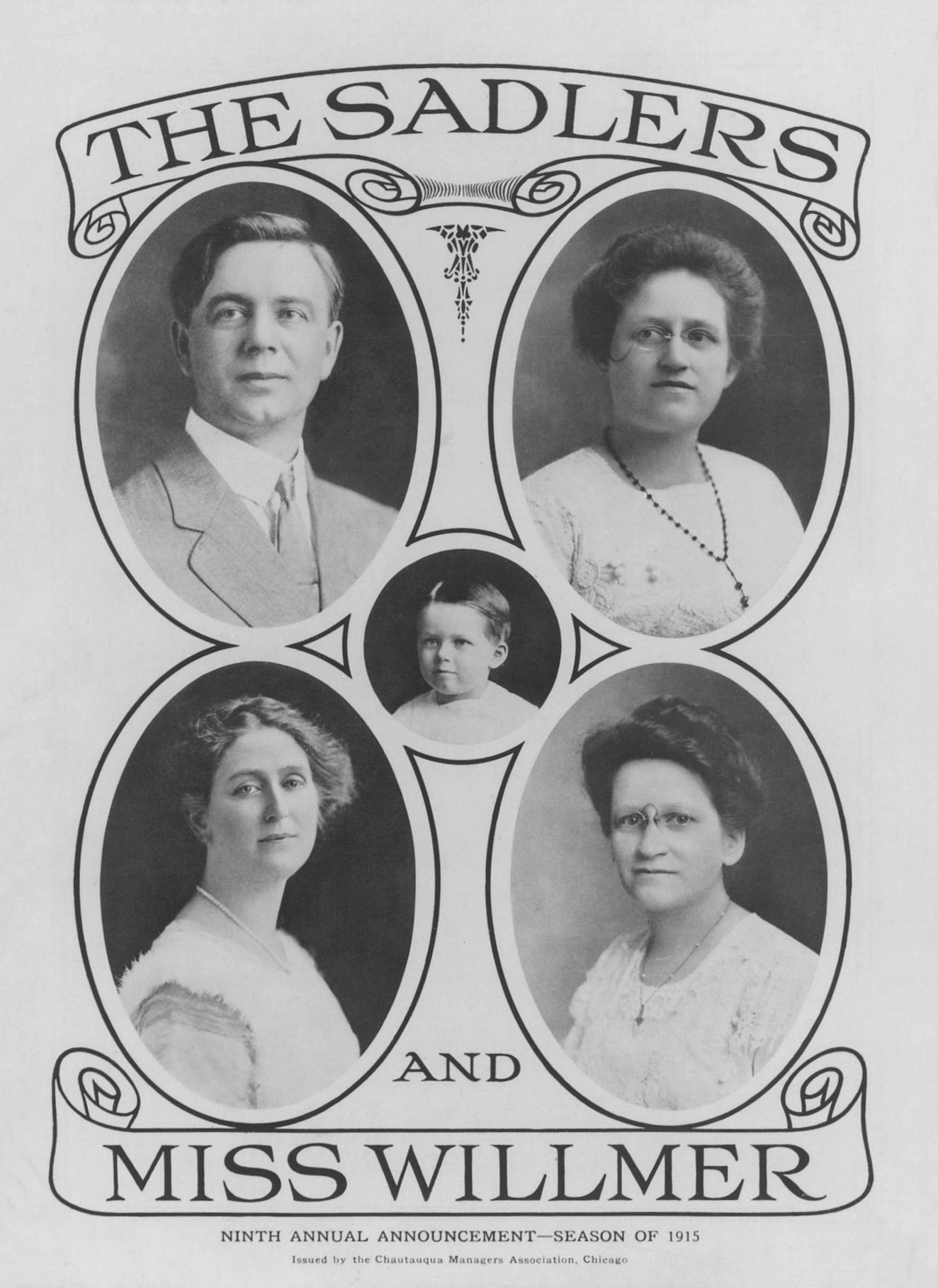
Chautauqua Annual Series 1915

After completing her literary education, she taught for two years and then took up the nursing profession. It was while engaged in professional studies as a nurse that she met her husband, William S. Sadler, and they married in 1897. After their marriage, the active interest they both had taken in health matters turned their attention toward the profession of medicine. They pursued their medical studies together, and graduated with equal honors at the American Medical Missionary College (Illinois State University) in 1906. Their only living son, William S. Sadler Jr., was born in 1907. She was one of many activists who diligently worked to recognize the contributions of women as professionals in the medical and scientific fields.

For twenty years Lena and her husband, William worked in rescue mission work for the Seventh-day Adventist Missions in Chicago and San Francisco. Lena concentrated on ministering to women detained in the Chicago jails. Lena and her family toured on the Redpath Chautauqua Circuit annually, lecturing on health. Dr Lena called together the first group of friends at their home that eventually became known as the Forum, the group that asked questions in response to papers read to them, which eventuated in the papers of The Urantia Book. Sadler, accompanied by her family, traveled to Paris for post graduate studies in 1928.

During the 1920s, she prepared a history of medical women in Illinois, and directed the survey of the mid-wives of Chicago under the auspices of the Chicago Health Department. As Chairman of Child Welfare of the Illinois Federation of Women's Clubs in 1925 and 1926, she was instrumental in bringing about working cooperation between four great organizations of the state — the Illinois State Medical Society, the Illinois State Dental Society, the State Department of Public Health, and the Illinois Federation Women's Clubs — in a united health project for the state. As State Chairman of Public Health and Child Welfare, she stressed public health for adults as well as for children. In an article in the Chicago Tribune of January 22, 1928, entitled "Woman's Club Annals Reveal Service to City", it states, "An equal source of pride with this incomplete record, in club circles, is the list of prominent members of these and earlier years. It includes Mrs. J Paul Good, recently deceased; Dr. Lena Sadler, Jane Adams..."

Dr. Bertha Van Hoosen, the Michigan Petticoat Surgeon, recalls, "In 1892, Chicago and the practice of medicine were so new to me that I was not even aware of the fight that medical women staged at that time for representation at the Columbian World's Fair. When Dr. Sarah Hackett Stevenson found out that medical women were to be allowed no part in that greatest of all fairs, she gathered her forces together and succeeded in getting a state appropriation for a Woman's Hospital exhibit. A building was erected in which the women doctors gave first aid and treated thousands of patients ... Forty years later, when arrangements for the Century of Progress were completed, the medical women were again excluded. In protestation, Dr. Lena Sadler and I appealed to the management for representation and space for some exhibit in the Hall of Science. We were told that, as there had been no arrangements for an exhibit on Maternal Hygiene, we might make an application for such an exhibit. However, there were a dozen applicants for the space, and if we wanted it, we would have to compete by presenting a perfect model of a maternal hygiene exhibit with all specifications. With the help of a hastily organized group of the medical, dental, and allied science women, we presented such a fascinating model that we were given the space..." "The financing was more difficult — so difficult that Dr. [Lena] Sadler and I found ourselves almost alone on the project. My democratic program was to collect one dollar from every medical, dental, and allied science woman in the United States, but Dr. Sadler said, 'No, no. That's too long and hard a job. Go to Lane Bryant and ask them to allow you to exhibit their maternity dresses. I will go to Vanta, and then there's the Camp maternity corset. These firms ought to pay $500 for the privilege of exhibiting their products ...' To my amazement, Dr. Sadler's plan brought us $6,000 in a few weeks so that the Medical, Dental, and Allied Science Women's Association for the Century of Progress was able to sponsor and furnish a booth on Maternal Hygiene in the Hall of Science, a booth on History of Women in Medicine in the Hall of Social Science, and a booth devoted to Child Welfare on the Enchanted Island."

== Published works ==
- The Mother and Her Child (1916), with William S. Sadler
- How to Reduce and How to Gain (1920), with William S. Sadler
- How to Feed the Baby (1930)

== Death ==
Sadler died on August 8, 1939, at her home in Chicago.
