= Henry Harrower =

Henry Robert Harrower, MD (April 30, 1883 – January 2, 1953) was a controversial early figure in endocrinology, and the author of several books and many papers on the subject. He was the impetus for the foundation of the Association for the Study of Internal Secretions, now called The Endocrine Society, and edited the first two editions of their journal Endocrinology. He was known for his advocacy of organotherapy, which involved consuming various glands and at times other parts of the body. He experienced financial success for this practice. Endocrinologists disdained these practices, believing that only the thyroid gland could have a meaningful effect when consumed orally. Harrower's organotherapy was the subject of repeated criticism. As he was the main proponent of the movement, it faded after his death.

== Early life ==
Harrower was born in London, England. When he was 20 years old he traveled to Battle Creek, Michigan to enroll in the American Medical Missionary College after studying for three years in Scandinavia to become a masseuse. At the Seventh-day Adventist college he learned, and was receptive to, the alternative therapy teachings of John Harvey Kellogg. He graduated and spent several years in France and Italy, travelling back and forth between Europe and the United States. It was during this time he became interested in advocating organotherapy. In 1912, he published his book, Practical Hormone Therapy, which dealt with organotherapeutic practices. He eventually settled in an exclusive suburb in Glendale, California and established The Harrower Laboratory and Clinic.

== Selected publications ==
- Harrower, Henry R. (1920), Practical Organotherapy: The Internal Secretions in General Practice, The Harrower Laboratory.
- Harrower, Henry R. (1931), Practical Endocrinology (Second Edition), Glendale, CA: Pioneer Publishing Co.
