= Oahspe: A New Bible =

1882 spriritualist book

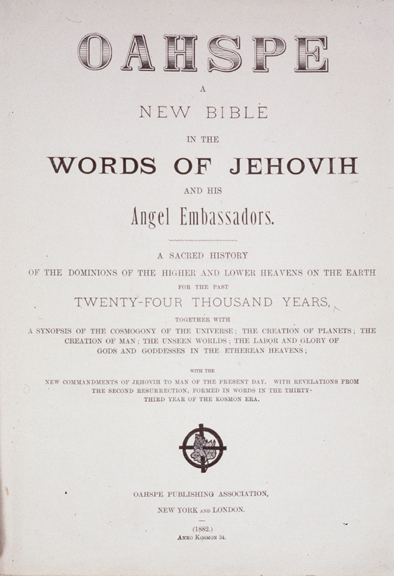
- First edition title page
- Original title: Oahspe: A New Bible
- Language: English
- Subject: Spiritual-Religious
- Publisher: Newbrough
- Publication date: 1882
- Publication place: United States
- Pages: 890

Oahspe: A New Bible is a book published in 1882, purporting to contain "new revelations" from "the Embassadors of the angel hosts of heaven prepared and revealed unto man in the name of Jehovih". It was produced by an American dentist, John Ballou Newbrough (1828–1891), who reported it to have been written by automatic writing, making it one of a number of 19th-century spiritualist works attributed to that practice. The text defines adherents of the disciplines expounded in Oahspe as "Faithists".

Oahspe comprises a series of related interior books chronicling earth and its heavenly administrations, as well as setting forth teachings for modern times. Included are over 100 drawings. The title page of Oahspe describes its contents with these words:

A New Bible in the Words of Jehovih and His Angel Embassadors. A Sacred History of the Dominions of the Higher and Lower Heavens on the Earth for the Past Twenty-Four Thousand Years together with a Synopsis of the Cosmogony of the Universe; the Creation of Planets; the Creation of Man; the Unseen Worlds; the Labor and Glory of Gods and Goddesses in the Etherean Heavens; with the New Commandments of Jehovih to Man of the Present Day.

"The Great Spirit", "Ormazd", "Egoquim", "Agoquim", "Eloih", "The I Am", and "Jehovih" are some of the names used throughout Oahspe as the name of the Creator.

According to Oahspe, the Creator is both masculine and feminine. Om is one of the names used to refer to the feminine (mother) aspect. Other references include, "The All Person", "The unseen" and "The Everpresent", "The All Light", "The Highest Light". God and Lord are titles of office for a person in the spirit realm who began life as mortal/in corporeal form (spirit within a body). The Creator is all and was all and forever will be all; They were never born and are beyond all gods. The Creator is our father and mother, and all that are and were born are our brothers and sisters.

== Genesis and first presentation ==
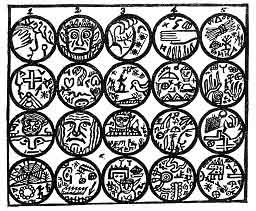
The "Tablet of Fonece," an illustration from Oahspe

Oahspe (the word is defined as "sky, earth (corpor) and spirit. The all; the sum of corporeal and spiritual knowledge as at present") was published in 1882.

Newbrough started writing the book in 1880 and stated that the writing was done automatically; he had been a spiritualist since the early 1870s. On at least two occasions Newbrough wrote publicly about how the Oahspe came about through automatic writing: in a letter published in the Banner of Light (a 19th-century Spiritualist newspaper), and an Addendum in the 1882 Edition republished by Raymond A. Palmer in 1972. Both accounts, written in the first person, indicate that Newbrough sat at a (newly invented) typewriter for half an hour each morning at which time his hands would automatically type (without his knowledge of what was being written). An article in The New York Times had him explain that, feeling the urge to write, he sat down with pen and paper until a bright light enveloped his fingers and they started writing. Moreover, many of the drawings contain symbols resembling hieroglyphs, presumably drawn. A copy of the "Banner of Light" letter accompanied Oahspes published by the Kosmon Press in England (such as it was received in New Zealand in 1895).

The first presentation of the book took place on 20 October 1882 in Newbrough's house, at 128 West 34th Street in New York City, where he presented the "new bible," "a large quarto volume of over 900 pages," to a group of people. According to The New York Times news article, Newbrough said that the book was not a sacred text per se, but rather a history of religions going back 24,000 years, and that the first publication of the book came about with the financial assistance of a number of unnamed contributors.

=== Style and language ===
The first (1882 edition) publication, as it was originally presented in 1882, contained various glyphs, whose resemblance to real Egyptian hieroglyphs was attested to by Prof. Thomas A. M. Ward, who claimed to have deciphered the hieroglyphics on the Cleopatra's Needle obelisk in Central Park. Ward was present at Oahspe's first presentation, as was Dr. Cetliniski, an Oriental scholar, who affirmed that mere mortals could not have produced such a book and that "supernatural agents" must have been responsible.

The first reporter on the book, writing for The New York Times, compared the book's content to a revised fusion of Indian and Semitic religions, and said its style was "in one place modern, and in another ancient, and the English of the King James version of the Christian Bible is mixed in with the English of today's."

== Basic teachings ==
Oahspe emphasized service to others; each person is graded according to service to others. Each individual, group and nation is either in ascension or descension; sooner or later, all ascend, rising in grade. The higher one's grade, the better are the conditions within one's own soul, and the better the place awaiting one in heaven.

According to Oahspe, when mortals die their spirits continue to live, regardless of who they worshiped, or even whether they disbelieved in an afterlife. The spirit realm becomes their new home, which is called heaven, and the individual spirit is called an angel. There are unorganized heavens close to or on the earth. Also starting there – and linking to the highest heavens – are the organized heavens. Both types of heavens are accessible to mortals. If a portion of heaven lives in a state of chaos and delights in evil, that portion is called hell.

An angel must subsist for a season after death somewhere along a continuum of delightful to abysmally wretched conditions. The heavenly place where angels initially live is determined by what their habits were as mortals; as well as by their aspirations and diet. Selfish behavior, low thoughts, or eating animal derived food will place a newborn angel in the lowest level, being on the earth. Evil oriented persons enter heaven into hellish conditions. Nevertheless, all in descension eventually turn around and ascend upward to more delightful places within an organized heaven, whose chief is called God. God is an advanced angel ordained into office for a season.

The morphologically plural name Elohim, often translated as god-singular in the Old Testament, is not used to mean the Creator throughout the main body of Oahspe; the singular Hebrew terms "Jehovih" (SHD 3069) and "Eloih" are used instead.

== Arrangement ==
According to Oahspe, the history of humankind is marked by a series of progressions. These lessons come in cycles: advancement followed by recession, being in turn succeeded by other cycles of improvement and regression. Cycles exist within cycles, but one important cycle, used in improving the grade of humanity, is a 3000-year cycle (average), and it is this cycle around which the books in Oahspe are organized.

The first few books of Oahspe lay the groundwork for understanding the nature of the work. This merges into a concise history taking the reader up to the present time, the new era. Separate from the history books are a series of books intended to illume for the reader the requirements of humanity for this day and age.

An interesting graphological characteristic of Oahspe is that a number of its sub-books are printed on pages divided in two. In these, the top half of the page contains a narrative of celestial events, while the bottom half describes the corresponding events on Earth.

== Synopsis ==
=== Doctrines ===
Oahspe includes doctrinal books, and precepts for behavior can be found throughout its many books. Freedom and responsibility are two themes reiterated throughout the text of Oahspe. Some core doctrines include an herbivorous diet (vegan, vegetable food only), peaceful living (no warring or violence; pacifism), living a life of virtue, service to others, angelic assistance, spiritual communion, and communal living, (the smallest collective unit being ten families, the largest being a total of 3,000 persons then dividing to create a new community).

=== Subjects ===
==== Ethics ====
Oahspe exhibits great interest in understanding and applying general ethical principles. The suffix ISM in Faith-ism is defined meaning adherence or following an ideology. The Book of Inspiration in the Oahspe states "I will have no sect. I will have no creed".

==== Religion ====
Oahspe speaks of the need for all religions to help the various nations and peoples to rise upward. It also speaks of what it calls "the religion of Gods themselves," in which its adherents have no need for intermediaries such as Saviors and Idols, but who commune directly with, the Creator, the All Person, the collective unconscious of the Universe.

==== History ====
Oahspe purports to describe events in the spirit realms and their corresponding influence on events in the physical world starting from approximately 72,000 years ago, although many of such events are not recorded in the existing human records. The Book of Eskra and the Book of Es, according to Oahspe, are the more recent historical records (as they were recorded in the spirit realms) from 1550 BCE to the time Oahspe was transcribed in 1880 CE. The Book of God's Word teaches the record of Zarathustra and dates his time on earth at 9000 years ago.

===== Geology and archeology =====
Oahspe gives details, including maps, about lost lands and new lands, particularly a large sunken continent called Pan or Whaga that once filled much of the Pacific Ocean. It also puts forward explanations on the causes of rapid loss or gain of fertility, the cyclical variations in heat and light upon the earth.

===== Language and linguistics =====
Oahspe presents many illustrations of symbols said to be of ancient languages and of rites and ceremonies. It states the concept that there was an original language called Pan or the Panic Language, meaning "Earth Language," which originated from the ability of humans to mimic sounds. Its Book of Saphah has details on the claimed meanings and roots of many of the ancient words, symbols and ceremonies.

===== Evolution or progress =====
Oahspe contains chronologically-ordered accounts that are cosmological revelations concerning the development of humanity from approximately 78,000 years ago. This also includes a narrative of the genesis of life on earth, from its start as a planet being formed from its beginnings as a comet gathering material as its vortex (subtle envelope) matures till it is placed into its own stable orbit around its sun. After cooling - the transformation of gases and its first life-forms - and finally to the appearance of the human race and its progression from beast to physical and spiritual maturity. The process, according to Oahspe, has reached its last stage with the emergence of the "herbivorous men and women of peace" of this Kosmon era.

==== System and order ====
===== Cosmogony =====
Oahspe explains physical science as having its basis in subtler realms (which include spiritual forces), and then how to predict from them. Oahspe devotes an entire interior book to the subject, called the Book of Cosmogony and Prophecy, but a general overview can be read in the Book of Jehovih. Also, many examples and edifications are sprinkled throughout Oahspe. Other related subjects include physics and an integrating treatment of gravity, light, electricity, magnetism, heat, weather phenomenon, subtle planetary envelopes (called vortices) that respond to conditions beyond its boundaries and more.

Vortex motion of planets was originally proposed by philosopher and mathematician René Descartes in the early 17th century, and was not a new scientific theory as Oahspe claims. Unfortunately for Descartes and Oahspe, vortex motion of planets was superseded by the scientific work of Isaac Newton.

===== Cycles =====
The text describes cyclical events that occur within a range of greater and smaller cycles. For instance, according to Oahspe, the earth is traveling with the sun and its planets through regions of space in a large circuit of 4,700,000 years, which is divided into sections of 3,000 years average, which also occur within larger cycles of 24,000 years and 72,000 years, and so on. Each of these regions has variations in density and other qualities, and so, engender varying conditions that the Earth encounters. Also, explanation is given as to the rise and fall of civilizations.

===== Administration =====
The various regions mentioned in the previous Cycles section are under the administration of spiritual or "etherean" beings with titles such as "God" and "Chief" and whose ranks and ages vary in ascending grade, from tens of thousands of years to hundreds of thousands of years old and older. Their dominions cover vast distances and include many spiritual and corporeal worlds of various grades and densities.

These chief officers are designated "Sons and Daughters of Jehovih," and in accordance, the text of Oahspe contains separate sections or "books" such as the Book of Cpenta-Armij, Daughter of Jehovih, and also includes familiar names from non-Abrahamic religions, as in the Book of Apollo and Book of Thor, named as Sons of Jehovih.

Each of these Chiefs, Chieftainesses, Gods and Goddesses is only advanced angels according to Oahspe. And every angel, regardless of rank or office, was once a mortal, either from this planet earth or from some other planet in the universe.

== Faithism ==
Soon after its publication, a number of groups/lodges formed in response to Oahspe. In New York City, the Oahspe Faithists met as early as 1883 in the Utah Hall (25th Street and 8th Avenue) with members only attending services. A first colony based on the book's principles was founded in 1882 by Newbrough in Woodside Township, New Jersey, but was relocated five months later to a property in Pearl River New York State.

It was from the Pearl River location that Newbrough and a number of Faithists and orphaned children went to Las Cruces, New Mexico, where they founded the Shalam Colony in 1884. The Shalam Colony continued to exist until 1901, although Newbrough died in 1891 during a severe influenza epidemic.

=== Faithist groups in the United States ===
- Universal Faithists of Kosmon Inc. (Utah, California, Colorado, and Ohio)
- Universal Light: The Voice of Jehovih The I Am Center, c. 1970–1986 (Anaheim, California)
- Brothers of Shalam (Albion, California)
- Brotherhood of Light, c. 1901–1908 (Arboles, Colorado)
- The Restoration Faithists (New York and Ohio)
- The Eloists (New England region)
- Oahspe College University (online)
- Seventh Era Faithist (online)
- The New York Kosmon Temple (Brooklyn, New York)
- Eloin Forest (The Oahspe Foundation, Oregon)

=== Faithist groups outside of the United States ===
- The Kosmon Sanctuary, in the United Kingdom
- The Oahspe Stichting, in the Netherlands
- Jehovih's Faithists (English Español and Português)
- Universal Brotherhood, in Balingup, NW Australia

=== Land of Shalam ===
The Shalam Colony, or Land of Shalam, was founded in 1884 as a communal farm in which members would live peaceful, vegetarian lifestyles, and where orphaned urban children were to be raised. The property was about 10 miles north-north-west of Las Cruces, New Mexico, and 1.2 miles west of Doña Ana. The commune was decided upon after a convention at Pearl River, New York, in November 1883, and was founded with the financial help of Andrew Howland. Newbrough raised money as well. He charged James Ellis $10,000 to join Shalam, and the next day Ellis demanded his money back. Newbrough refused to return the money. Members spent the first winter in adobe huts, and in 1885 began building a 42-room central building, the Fraternum. Children were "'gathered-up' from foundling homes; handed over by police sergeants; and left in Faithist depositories". Newbrough and his wife traveled as far as Kansas City, San Francisco, New Orleans, and Chicago to gather children. The children, from a variety of races, were pampered and treated with love and kindness.

By the time Newbrough died (on 22 April 1891, of influenza), the colony consisted of the Fraternum, the Children's House (completed in 1890), and a church and other buildings. After the majority of the original volunteers left Shalam in 1886 when the financier, Howland resumed ownership of the property, a second type of colony was built a half a mile away from Shalam; called Levitica, it was founded for people who were not particularly followers of Oahspe teachings but needed a place to live. Levitica was designed in a less communal fashion, and inhabitants lived in more isolated homes. This arrangement also soon failed due to various factors including non-participation.

Apparently, the colony was not a viable financial enterprise, due to the repeated failure of crops, the lack of markets for the crops they did produce, and the frequent flooding of the Rio Grande; Newbrough's wife, Francis van de Water Sweet, had married Howland in 1893 "to put an end to malicious gossip" but the cost of maintaining the colony proved too high. In 1901, the colony folded, and the children were sent to orphanages in Dallas and Denver.

=== Related publications ===
Numerous publications have been inspired by Oahspe, incorporating text and ideas from it, as well as reinterpretations, condensed and abridged versions. Many of these publications were from: The Essenes of Kosmon, Montrose, Colorado; Kosmon Press, London; Palmer Publications, Amherst, Wisconsin; Universal Faithists of Kosmon, Salt Lake City, Utah; Kosmon Publishing Inc., Kingman, Arizona; The Eloists, Massachusetts; Four Winds Village, Tiger, Georgia. 2009 Edition of Oahspe Seven Books of Spiritual Wisdom https://openlibrary.org/books/OL24615840M/Oahspe_Seven_Books_of_Spiritual_Wisdom 1998 Edition of Oahspe https://openlibrary.org/books/OL400274M/Oahspe

== Biography of John Newbrough ==
John Ballou Newbrough was born on 5 June 1828 near Mohicanville, Ohio, in a log cabin. His father, William Newbrough, was an Englishman who had attended the College of William & Mary; his mother, Elizabeth Polsky, was Swiss and attracted to spiritualism. Their son was named for the universalist clergyman Hosea Ballou. Newbrough's father was a stern man, flogging his son when the latter "began to receive spirit messages"; his schooling (he went to high school in Cleveland) was paid for by his mother and him selling wool and eggs. He graduated from Cincinnati Medical College, but being highly sensitive to pain and suffering he chose dentistry, setting up practice first in Dayton, then Cincinnati, and then New York City. He ran into trouble with the Goodyear Rubber Company after he developed a much cheaper compound to set teeth in dental plates than the one produced by Goodyear, which dominated the market. He was sued for patent infringement, but when the verdict was handed down in his favor, after he had supposedly consulted with spirits who visited him at dawn, he saw that as confirmation of his spiritual future.

== Critical reception ==
The Surrealist poet David Gascoyne at first found the claims of the book ridiculous, but eventually reread it and evaluated it as "the most astonishing book in the English language".

Martin Gardner, a scientific skeptic of The Urantia Book, considered Oahspe to be a similar type of production. Gardner opined that Oahspe is even "crazier than the works of Swedenborg and Davis" and that rather than a religious work, the book "could just as well be classified as moonshine." Edgar Johnson Goodspeed included it in Famous Biblical Hoaxes (1956), and Gordon Stein in the book Encyclopedia of Hoaxes (1993) noted that Oahspe has not been taken seriously because it was revealed to contain "many factual errors and unfulfilled prophecies."

== Modern culture ==
In modern times it has been stated "Newbrough was possibly the first to use the word 'starship'."

== See also ==
- Trinity
- New religious movement
- The Urantia Book
- The Seekers (rapturists)

== Bibliography ==
- Stoes, K.D. (1958). The Land of Shalam: A Strange Experience in Child Life. New Mexico Historical Review.
- Ballou Newbrough, John (January 1, 1982). Oahspe a New Bible in the Words of Jehovah and His Angel Embassadors: A Sacred History of the Dominions of the Higher and Lower Heavens on the Earth. Amherst Pr. ISBN 9780910122016.
