= Lottie Isbell Blake =

American physician, medical missionary, and educator

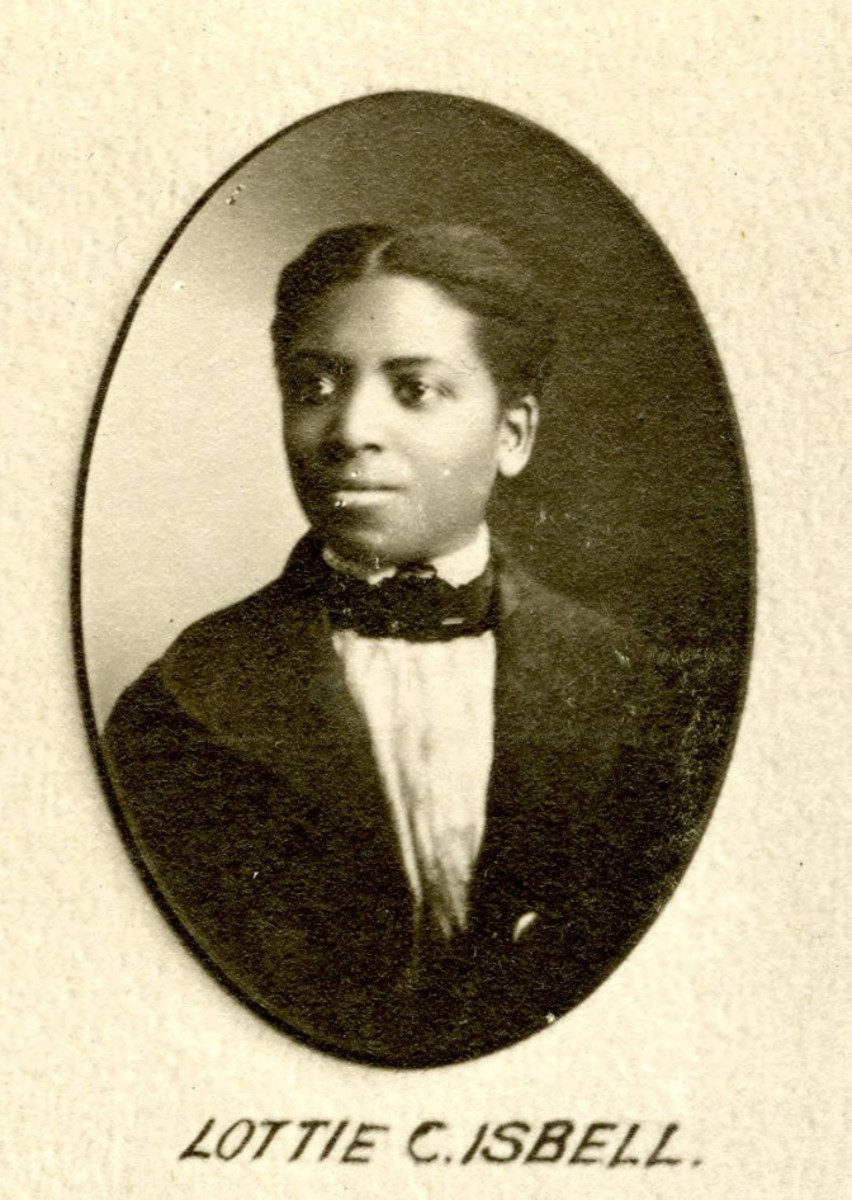
- Born: Charlotte Cornella Isbell; 10 June 1876; Appomattox, VA
- Died: 16 November 1976 (aged 100)
- Citizenship: United States of America
- Education: American Medical Missionary College
- Known for: hydrotherapy
- Spouse: David Emanuel Blake

Lottie Cornella Isbell Blake, M.D., (10 June 1876 – 16 November 1976) was an American physician, medical missionary, and educator. Blake was the first black Seventh Day Adventist to become a physician. She is remembered for her revolutionary success in hydrotherapy which at the time was not seen as a sophisticated medical treatment. Lottie Blake, along with her husband Dr. David Emanuel Blake, travelled and worked in Panama, Haiti, and Jamaica as a self-supporting medical missionary. During her life, Dr. Lottie Blake became licensed to practice medicine in Ohio, Tennessee, Alabama, Panama, West Virginia and Pennsylvania. Blake found the cure for “Smokey City pneumonia” which was caused by smog in Pittsburgh, Pennsylvania. After 50 years of service, Lottie Blake was honored by the American Medical Association at eighty-one years old.

== Early life ==
Lottie Isbell Blake was born in Appomattox, Virginia, the daughter of Fannie and Thomas Isbell. When Lottie was three, the Isbell family moved from Virginia to Columbus, Ohio. Thomas Isbell was a carpenter and Fanny Isbell helped to establish the Union Grove Baptist church while raising Lottie and her nine siblings. The Isbell children were raised as Baptists for much of their youth but when Lottie was twenty years old she, her mother, and her sister Mamie converted to become members of the Seventh-day Adventist church.

== Education ==
Following high school, Blake went on to receive her teaching certification at age 20. Though she had studied to become a teacher, Blake went on to train and work as a nurse at the Battle Creek Sanitarium in Battle Creek Michigan which was founded by members of the Seventh-day Adventist Church. Dr. John Harvey Kellogg, director of the Battle Creek Sanitarium, with whom she lived and worked under became a mentor for Blake during her years as a nurse. Encouraged by Dr. Kellogg, Blake then attended medical school. She graduated from the American Medical Missionary College in 1902 at 26 years old, becoming the first black Seventh Day Adventist to become a physician.

== Early career ==
Initially, Blake's missionary work remained within the southern United States. She worked as the director of the Rock City Sanitarium in Nashville, Tennessee and a practicing physician in Birmingham, Alabama. The black community in Nashville felt that Blake's treatments were less advanced than what they were used too from within their community and labeled them "rag treatments". Feeling rejected by Nashville, she moved her work to the rural community of Hillcrest, just north of Nashville. But again, she was met with resistance. After an epidemic broke out in an orphanage in Huntsville, Alabama, Blake relocated to work there to help. She later went on to work at the Huntsville Oakwood Manual Training School, now Oakwood University, in Huntsville Alabama, where she was the first black faculty member, with a doctorate, and where she established a nurses training program at Oakwood that is still running today. In 1904, she became a licensed physician in the state of Alabama. After marrying her husband Dr. David Emanuel Blake on September 18, 1907, the couple moved to Nashville, where Lottie reopened the natural treatment rooms at the Rock City Sanitarium, while David was studying medicine at Meharry Medical College. They worked there until David graduated in 1912, before moving back to Columbus, Ohio in 1912.

== Missionary Work ==
=== Panama ===
Blake, her husband, and their five children left the United States in 1913 to do missionary work in Panama. The couple served as self-supporting medical missionaries while Lottie Blake cared for their five children. For the four years that the family lived in Panama, Blake engaged in less medical work instead focusing primarily on establishing a school for her children and the children of wealthy people who lived in the area. Yellow Fever and Malaria were the primary illnesses affecting the region of the Panama Canal where the family resided, which became the primary focuses of doctors during that time period. Working with minimal resources, the Blakes were able to successfully acquire a building in Cristóbal and equipment to do medical work. It was during this time period in Panama that every member of the Blake family became infected with malaria at some point.

=== Haiti ===
After Panama, the family relocated to Port-au-Prince, Haiti. They provided medical care and established a church. However, with little savings and having to raise five children, they were unable to finance their ministries. In May 1916, General Conference leaders sympathized with their situation and gave them $200 for their church and $150 grant-in-aid to David for his mission work in Cape Haitien. With agitation from the revolutions, Haiti being occupied by U.S. Marines and another round of malaria, the Blake family stayed in Haiti for only three months, finding the circumstances to be too challenging to live and work in.

=== Jamaica ===
The Blake family then went to Jamaica, where David Blake had been born and raised, they lived with relatives for eighteen months.

== Post-Missionary Work ==
The Blakes moved to Charleston, West Virginia with the intention of setting up a medical practice, but Dr. David Blake died of pneumonia within a week of arriving in 1917. Lottie Blake sent her children to live with family in Columbus, Ohio while she went to practice in Charleston in 1920 and stayed for five years. In 1925, Blake moved back to Columbus to reunite with her children and practiced medicine until 1935. At this point, Blake moved to Pittsburgh, Philadelphia where she focused on the treatment of women and children. It was here where she found the cure for “Smokey City pneumonia”, which was a type of pneumonia caused by the pollution and smog in Pittsburgh and other large cities at the time. She continued to work in Pittsburgh until her retirement in 1957 at eighty-one years old.

== Final Years ==
The American Medical Association honor Lottie for her more than 50-year career in the medical field. In her retirement years, she continued to give Bible studies and teaching religious literature to those who sought to learn from her. She settle with her daughter, Alice Evelyn, in Huntsville, Alabama for her final years. Dr. Lottie Blake died of natural causes November 16, 1976 at 100 years old.

== Legacy ==
Dr. Lottie Blake is remembered as a medical missionary, educator, and pioneer of the medical ministry practice. While there were rough patches throughout her time, her service in the medical field was a turning point in the medical field an for African Americans in the south. She was the first black female doctor in Alabama and the first black Seventh-Day Adventist to receive a medical degree. She left behind a legacy of high faith, power in education, and a determination to serve and treat the African American community.
